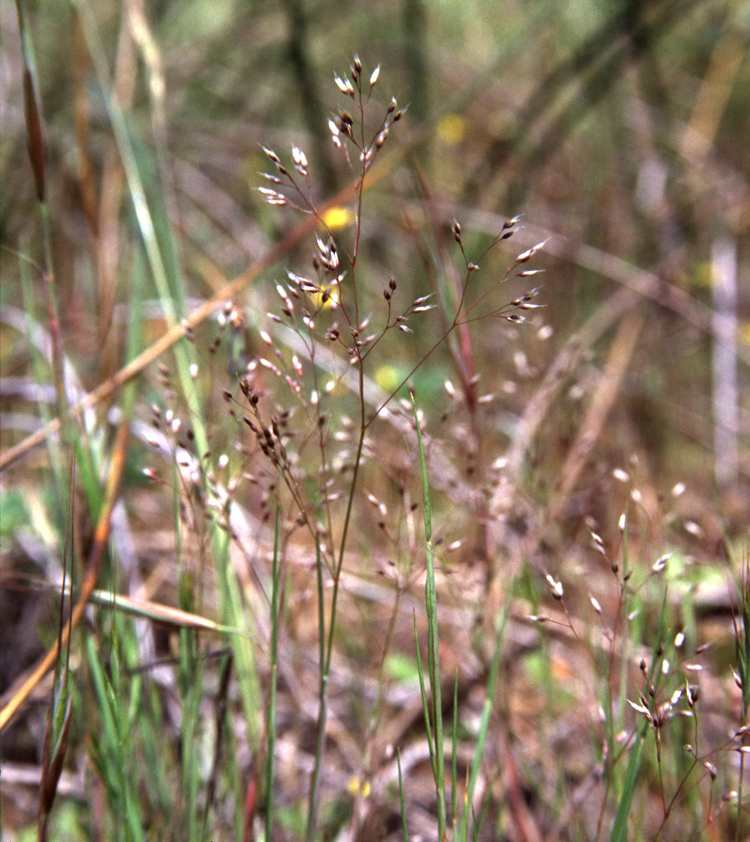
- Aira caryophyllea

Scientific classification
- Kingdom: Plantae
- Clade: Embryophytes
- Clade: Tracheophytes
- Clade: Angiosperms
- Clade: Monocots
- Clade: Commelinids
- Order: Poales
- Family: Poaceae
- Subfamily: Pooideae
- Supertribe: Poodae
- Tribe: Poeae
- Subtribe: Airinae
- Genus: Aira; L.

Type species
- Aira praecox L.

Synonyms
- Aspris Adans.; Caryophyllea Opiz; Fiorinia Parl.; Fussia Schur

= Aira =

Genus of grasses

Aira is a genus of Old World plants in the grass family, native to western and southern Europe, central and southwest Asia, and Africa.

The common name, shared with the similar related genera Deschampsia and Koeleria, is hair-grass, from the very slender leaves and stems. The species typically occur on dry, sandy sites, and grow to 20–40 cm tall.

Several species are grown as ornamental plants for their very delicate airy seed heads, used in dried flower arrangements.

Species

- Aira caryophyllea L. – Europe, North Africa, alpine Africa, Madagascar, Mauritius, Caucasus, Tibet
- Aira cupaniana Guss. – Canary Islands, Mediterranean
- Aira elegans Willd. – Europe, North Africa, Western Asia, Caucasus
- Aira hercynica Romero Zarco, M.Á.Ortiz & L.Sáez – Portugal, Spain
- Aira minoricensis P.Fraga, Romero Zarco & L.Sáez – Menorca
- Aira multiculmis Dumort. – Europe
- Aira praecox L. – Europe, Canary Islands, Turkey
- Aira provincialis Jord. – France incl Corsica
- Aira scoparia Adamović – Macedonia
- Aira tenorei Guss. – Mediterranean
- Aira uniaristata Lag. & Rodr. – Portugal, Spain, Libya, Morocco

formerly included

Many species now considered better suited to other genera: Agrostis, Antinoria, Arundinella, Arundo, Catabrosa, Colpodium, Corynephorus, Cyrtococcum, Deschampsia, Ehrharta, Eragrostis, Eriachne, Eustachys, Hierochloe, Koeleria, Molinia, Pentameris, Peyritschia, Poa, Puccinellia, Rostraria, Scolochloa, Sesleria, Sphenopholis, Sporobolus, Tricholaena, Trisetum etc.

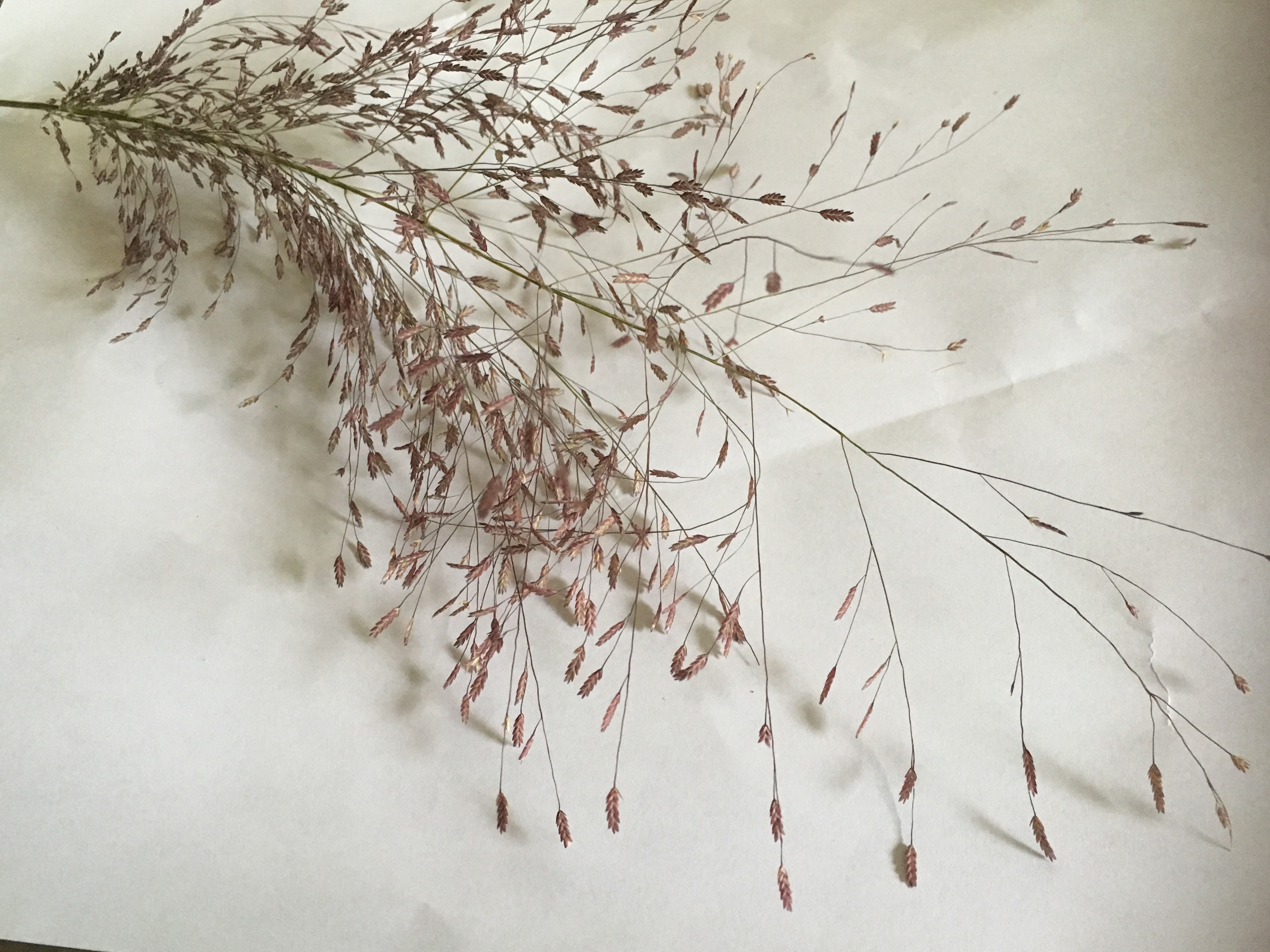
Aira sp. inflorescence

== See also ==
- List of Poaceae genera
