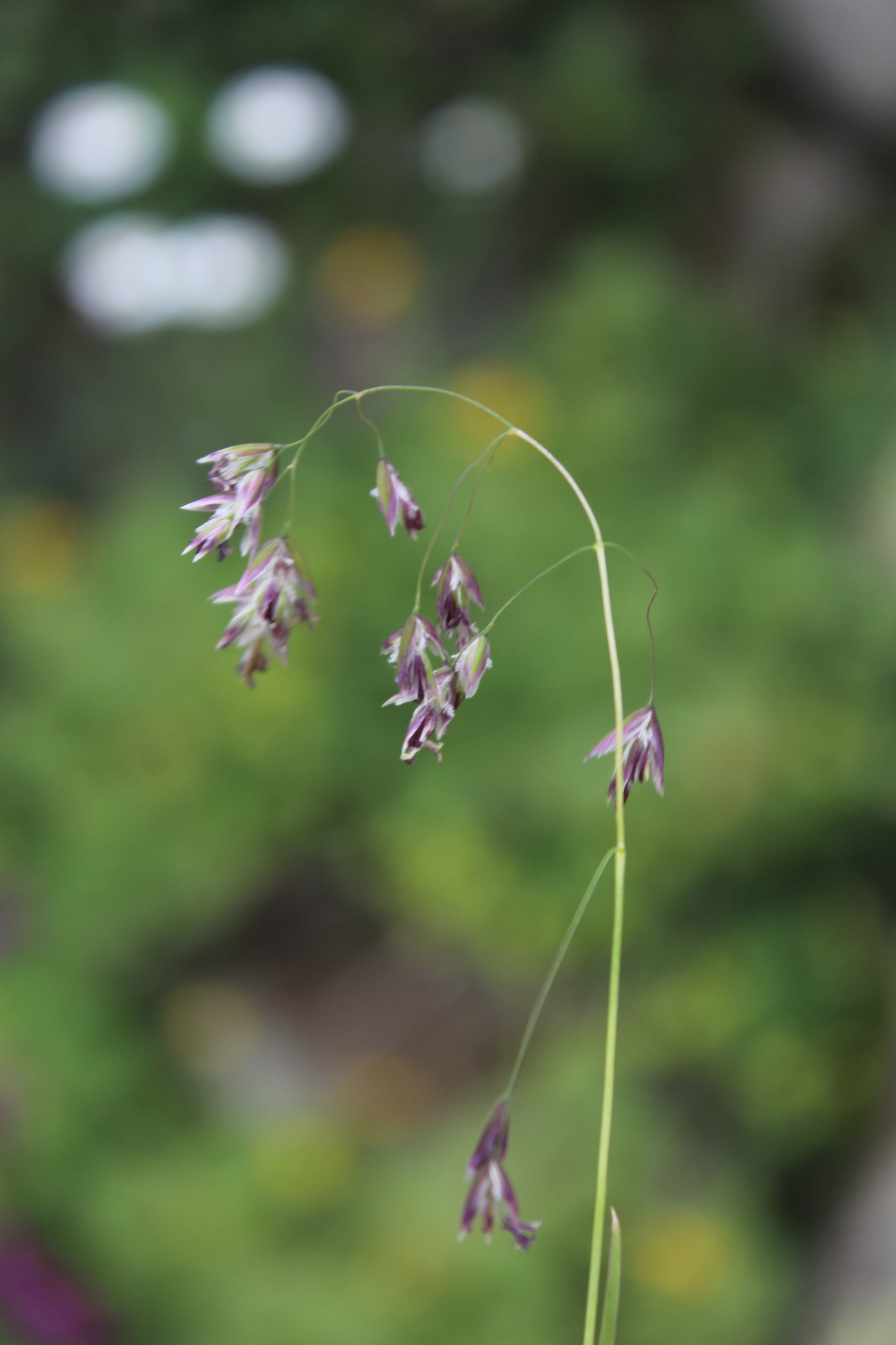
- Colpodium ponticum

Scientific classification
- Kingdom: Plantae
- Clade: Embryophytes
- Clade: Tracheophytes
- Clade: Spermatophytes
- Clade: Angiosperms
- Clade: Monocots
- Clade: Commelinids
- Order: Poales
- Family: Poaceae
- Subfamily: Pooideae
- Supertribe: Poodae
- Tribe: Poeae
- Subtribe: Coleanthinae
- Genus: Colpodium; Trin.

Type species
- Colpodium stevenii (syn of C. versicolor) Trin.

Synonyms
- Colpodium subg. Paracolpodium Tzvelev; Colpodium subg. Catabrosella Tzvelev; Catabrosa sect. Colpodium (Trin.) Boiss.; Vilfa subg. Colpodium (Trin.) Trin.; Catabrosella (Tzvelev) Tzvelev; Keniochloa Melderis; Paracolpodium (Tzvelev) Tzvelev; Paracol-podium (Tzvelev) Tzvelev, alternate spelling

= Colpodium =

Genus of grasses

Colpodium is a genus of plants in the grass family, native primarily to Asia but with a few species on certain mountains in Africa.

Species

- Colpodium altaicum Trin. ex Ledeb. - Altai Mountains (Altai Krai, Xinjiang, Mongolia, Kazakhstan)
- Colpodium araraticum (Lipsky) Woronow ex Grossh. - Turkey, Armenia
- Colpodium baltistanicum Dickore - Jammu-Kashmir
- Colpodium chionogeiton (Pilg.) Tzvelev - Kenya, Tanzania
- Colpodium colchicum (Albov) Woronow ex Grossh. - Circassia, Turkey
- Colpodium drakensbergense Hedberg & I.Hedberg - KwaZulu-Natal, Lesotho
- Colpodium fibrosum Trautv. - northeastern Turkey
- Colpodium gillettii Bor - Iraq
- Colpodium hedbergii (Melderis) Tzvelev - Ethiopia, Kenya, Tanzania, South Africa
- Colpodium himalaicum (Hook.f.) Bor - Jammu-Kashmir
- Colpodium humile (M.Bieb.) Griseb. - Xinjiang, Siberia, Kazakhstan, Uzbekistan, Kyrgyzstan
- Colpodium lakium Woronow - Dagestan
- Colpodium lanatiflorum (Roshev.) Tzvelev - Siberia
- Colpodium nutans (Stapf) Bor - Uttarakhand, Jammu-Kashmir, Himachal Pradesh
- Colpodium oreades (Peter) E.B.Alexeev - Mount Kilimanjaro in Tanzania
- Colpodium parviflorum Boiss. & Buhse - Iran, Turkey, Caucasus
- Colpodium ponticum (Balansa) Woronow - Turkey
- Colpodium tibeticum Bor - Tibet, Bhutan, Nepal
- Colpodium variegatum (Boiss.) Boiss. ex Griseb. - Iran, Turkey
- Colpodium versicolor (Steven) Schmalh. - Iran, Iraq, Turkey, Caucasus
- Colpodium violaceum (Boiss.) Griseb. - Iran, Iraq
- Colpodium wallichii (Hook.f.) Bor - Nepal, Sikkim

formerly included

see Arctagrostis Arctophila Catabrosa Dupontia Festuca Hyalopoa Muhlenbergia Periballia Phippsia Poa Puccinellia × Pucciphippsia Sporobolus

- Colpodium afghanicum - Festuca olgae
- Colpodium aquaticum - Catabrosa aquatica
- Colpodium arundinaceum - Arctagrostis arundinacea
- Colpodium compressum - Muhlenbergia torreyana
- Colpodium drakensbergense - Catabrosa drakensbergensis
- Colpodium elbursense - Catabrosa aquatica
- Colpodium filifolium - Puccinellia filifolia
- Colpodium fulvum - Arctophila fulva
- Colpodium ivanoviae - Hyalopoa lanatiflora
- Colpodium junceum - Sporobolus junceus
- Colpodium lakium - Hyalopoa lakia
- Colpodium lanatiflorum - Hyalopoa lanatiflora
- Colpodium langei - Dupontia fisheri
- Colpodium latifolium - Arctagrostis latifolia
- Colpodium malmgrenii - Arctophila fulva
- Colpodium minutum - Periballia minuta
- Colpodium monandrum - Phippsia algida
- Colpodium mucronatum - Arctophila fulva
- Colpodium nutans - Hyalopoa nutans
- Colpodium pamiricum - Puccinellia pamirica
- Colpodium pauciflorum - Poa glauca
- Colpodium pendulinum - Arctophila fulva
- Colpodium planifolium - Poa planifolia
- Colpodium ponticum - Hyalopoa pontica
- Colpodium pusillum - Pentameris pusilla
- Colpodium thomsonii - Poa infirma
- Colpodium tilesii - Arctagrostis arundinacea
- Colpodium × vacillans - × Pucciphippsia vacillans
- Colpodium wrightii - Puccinellia wrightii
