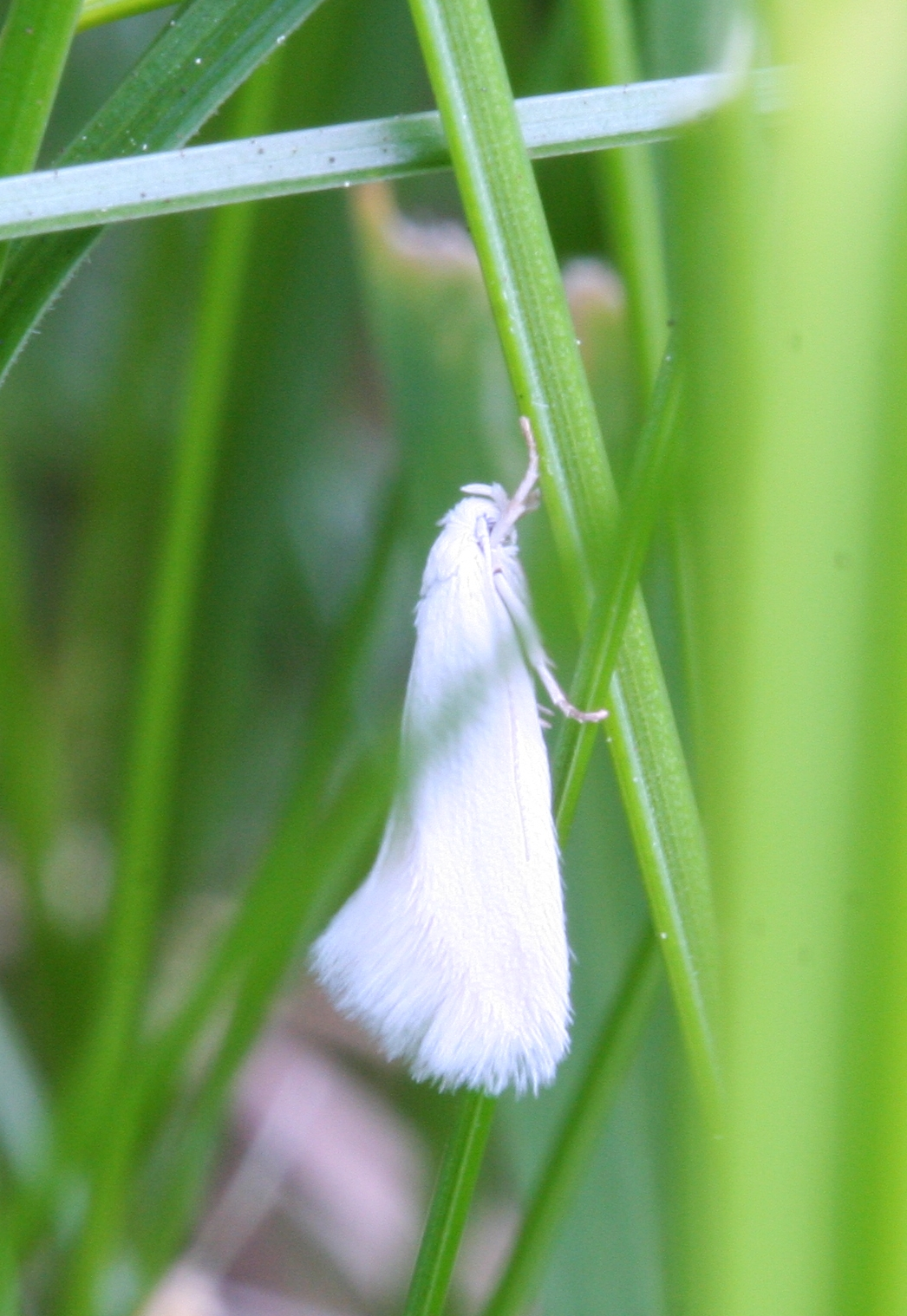

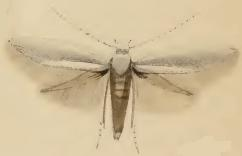

Scientific classification
- Kingdom: Animalia
- Phylum: Arthropoda
- Class: Insecta
- Order: Lepidoptera
- Family: Elachistidae
- Genus: Elachista
- Species: E. argentella

Binomial name
- Elachista argentella (Clerck, 1759)

Synonyms
- Phalaena argentella Clerck 1759; Elachista cygnipennella (Hübner, 1796); Elachista habeleri Traugott-Olsen, 1990

= Elachista argentella =

Species of moth

Elachista argentella is a moth of the family Elachistidae found in all of Europe, except the Balkan Peninsula.

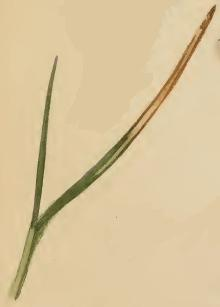
Mined leaf blade of Bromus erectus

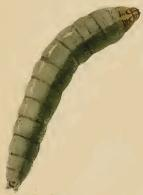
Larva

The wingspan is 11–12 millimetres (0.43–0.47 in). The head is white. Forewings are white, sometimes ochreous- tinged. Hindwings in male grey in female grey-whitish. The larva is greenish-grey; dorsal line whitish;head pale brown.

The moth flies from May to July depending on the location.

The larvae feed on a number of different species of grass including Agrostis, Avenula pratensis, Avenula pubescens, Brachypodium pinnatum, Brachypodium sylvaticum, Bromus erectus, Bromus sterilis, Calamagrostis epigejos, Dactylis glomerata, Deschampsia cespitosa, Elymus hispidus, Elymus repens, Festuca ovina, Festuca rubra, Festuca trachyphylla, Festuca valesiaca, Holcus lanatus, Holcus mollis, Koeleria glauca, Koeleria grandis, Koeleria macrantha, Leymus arenarius, Phalaris arundinacea, Phleum and Poa pratensis. They mine the leaves of their host plant.
