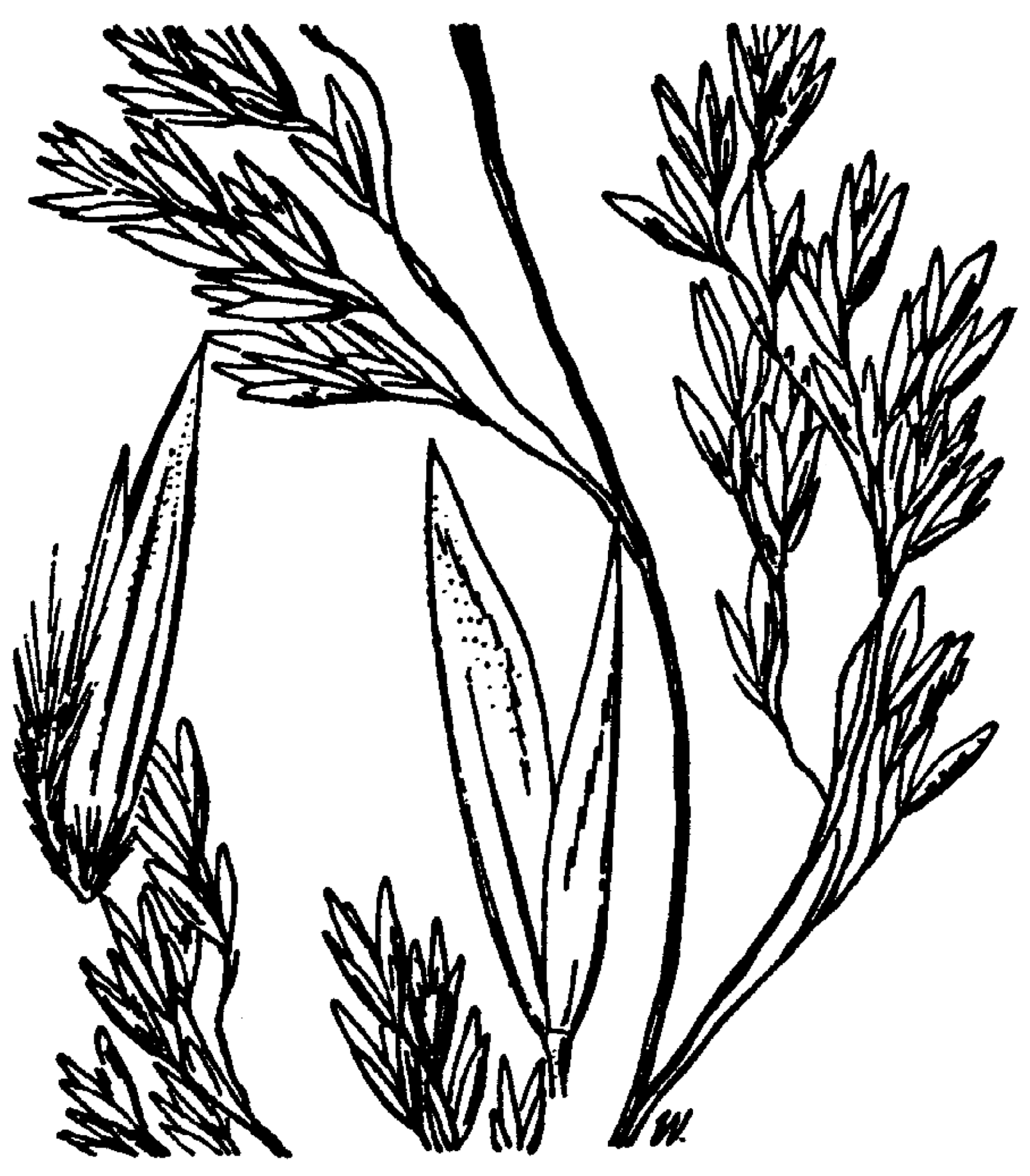
- Graphephorum melicoides

Scientific classification
- Kingdom: Plantae
- Clade: Tracheophytes
- Clade: Angiosperms
- Clade: Monocots
- Clade: Commelinids
- Order: Poales
- Family: Poaceae
- Subfamily: Pooideae
- Supertribe: Poodae
- Tribe: Poeae
- Subtribe: Aveninae
- Genus: Graphephorum; Desv. 1810 not Honda 1934

Type species
- Graphephorum melicoides (Michx.) Desv.

Synonyms
- Trisetum subsect. Graphephorum (Desv.) Louis-Marie

= Graphephorum =

Genus of grasses

Graphephorum is a genus of North American plants in the grass family.

== Species ==
Seven species are currently accepted.

- Graphephorum ambiguum (Rúgolo & Nicora) Barberá & Quintanar – southern Chile and southern Argentina
- Graphephorum canescens (Buckley) Röser & Tkach – western Canada and western United States
- Graphephorum cernuum (Trin.) Röser & Tkach – southern Alaska, western Canada, northwestern United States, California, southern Argentina and southern Chile
- Graphephorum longiglume (Hack.) Barberá & Quintanar – western Argentina and central Chile
- Graphephorum melicoides (Michx.) Desv. – Ontario, Québec, New Brunswick, Nova Scotia, Newfoundland, Maine, New Hampshire, Vermont, New York, Michigan, Wisconsin
- Graphephorum mendocinense (Hauman) Barberá & Quintanar – western Argentina
- Graphephorum × orthochaetum (Hitchc.) Barberá & Quintanar (G. canescens × G. wolfii) – Montana (Missoula County)
- Graphephorum wolfii (Vasey) Coult. – British Columbia, Alberta, Saskatchewan south to California and New Mexico

formerly included

see Dupontia, Hyalopoa, Molinia, Muhlenbergia, Peyritschia, Poa, Scolochloa, Sphenopholis, and Trisetum

- Graphephorum altijugum - Peyritschia koelerioides
- Graphephorum arundinaceum - Scolochloa festucacea
- Graphephorum densiflorum - Sphenopholis obtusata
- Graphephorum elliottii - Poa cuspidata
- Graphephorum festucaceum - Scolochloa festucacea
- Graphephorum fisheri - Dupontia fisheri
- Graphephorum flexuosum - Muhlenbergia multiflora
- Graphephorum fulvum - Dupontia fulva
- Graphephorum nipponicum - Molinia japonica
- Graphephorum nutans - Hyalopoa nutans
- Graphephorum pendulinum - Dupontia fulva
- Graphephorum pringlei - Peyritschia graphephoroides P.M.Peterson, Soreng, Romasch. & Barberá
- Graphephorum psilosanthum - Dupontia fisheri
- Graphephorum shearii - Koeleria spicata subsp. spicata
