= Lake Adamovas Nature Park =

Protected area in Latvia

- IUCN category II (national park)
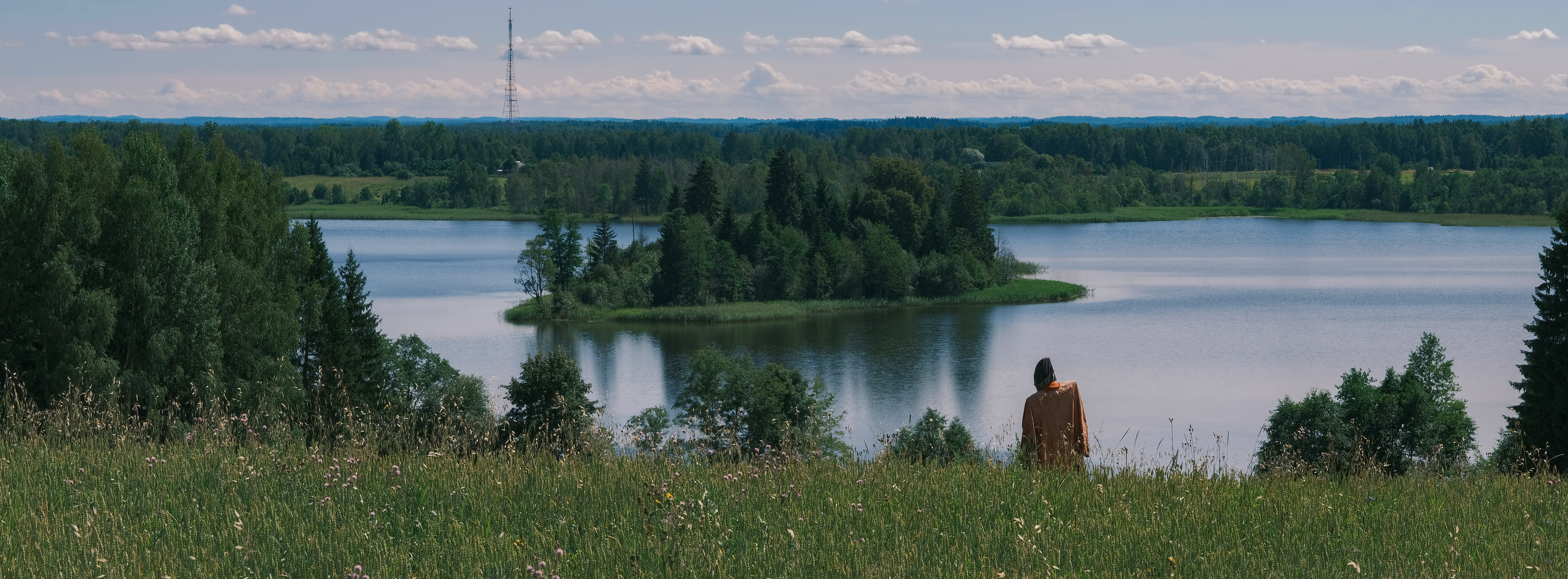

- Location within Latvia
- Location: Latvia
- Coordinates: 56°34′N 27°24′E
- Area: 761 ha (1,880 acres)
- Established: 1977

Adamovas Lake Nature Park is a specially protected nature territory Rēzekne district Vērēmi Parish. Includes Lake Adamovas, part of Lake Vizulītis and Burzava Hills part between these lakes with 203.5 m high Sarkaņkolns. The protected area was established in 1977 as a complex nature reserve in the area of 441 ha "Lake Adamova with the surrounding landscape", was reorganized in 1998 into a nature reserve. Natura 2000 site. A popular place to relax.

== Flora ==
Protected habitats of European importance include natural eutrophic lakes with submerged aquatic and floating vegetation, European black alder (Alnus glutinosa), boreal forests, mixed broadleaf forests.

Three rare species has been discovered in lake Adamovas since the end of the 19th century. In 20th century the eight-stamen waterwort (Elatine hydropiper) has disappeared from the lake due to water level lowering and pollution. Two other rare species – least water-lily (Nuphar pumila) and common rivergrass (Scolochloa festucacea) are thriving well almost everywhere on the lake.

== Fauna ==
Lake Adamovas and its surroundings are feeding ground for a number of bats species, including the European pond bat (Myotis dasycneme).
