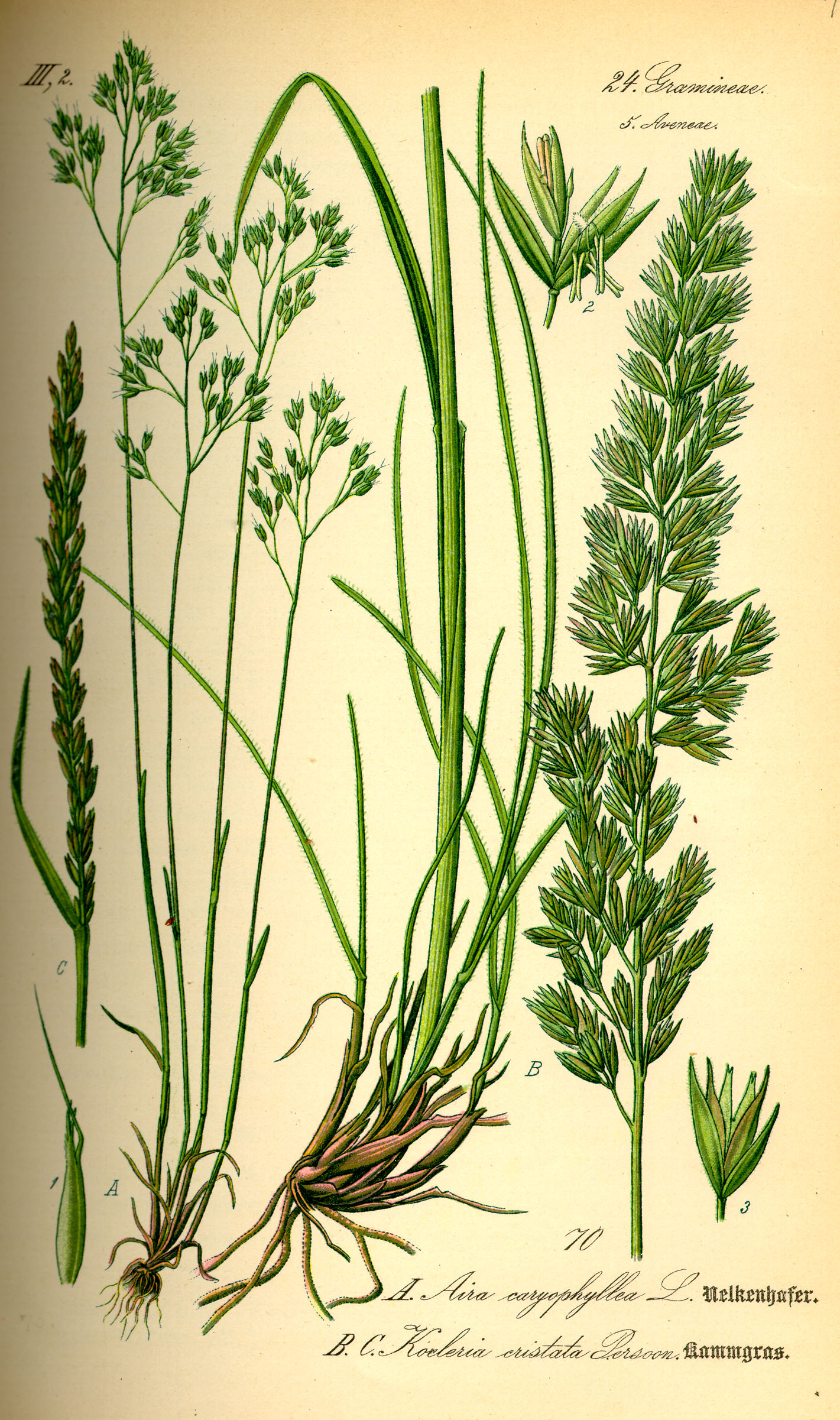
- Koeleria pyramidata (figure B at right)

Scientific classification
- Kingdom: Plantae
- Clade: Tracheophytes
- Clade: Angiosperms
- Clade: Monocots
- Clade: Commelinids
- Order: Poales
- Family: Poaceae
- Subfamily: Pooideae
- Supertribe: Poodae
- Tribe: Poeae
- Subtribe: Aveninae
- Genus: Koeleria; Pers.

Type species
- Poa nitida (syn of Koeleria macrantha) Lam.

Synonyms
- Achaeta E.Fourn.; Airochloa Link; Brachystylus Dulac; Collinaria Ehrh.; Leptophyllochloa Calderón ex Nicora

= Koeleria =

Junegrasses

Genus of grasses

Koeleria is a common and widespread genus of plants in the grass family, found on all continents except Antarctica and on various oceanic islands. It includes species known generally as Junegrasses.

The genus was named after German botanist Georg Ludwig Koeler (1765–1807).

Species

- Koeleria altaica – Siberia, China, Kazakhstan, Mongolia
- Koeleria argentea – China, Mongolia, Central Asia, Afghanistan, Pakistan, Himalayas
- Koeleria asiatica – Russia, China incl Tibet, Mongolia, Alaska, Yukon, Northwest Territories
- Koeleria askoldensis – Primorye region of Russia incl Askold Island
- Koeleria besseri – Europe from the Czech Republic to central European Russia
- Koeleria biebersteinii – Crimea
- Koeleria boliviensis – Bolivia
- Koeleria brevis – Ukraine, Russia, Caucasus, Turkey
- Koeleria calderonii – Argentina (Mendoza)
- Koeleria capensis – Yemen, Africa from Ethiopia + Cameroon to Cape Province
- Koeleria carolii – Morocco
- Koeleria caudata – Spain, Portugal, Morocco, Algeria
- Koeleria cenisia – western Alps (France, Italy, Switzerland)
- Koeleria cheesemanii – New Zealand
- Koeleria crassipes – Spain, Portugal
- Koeleria delavignei – Russia, Ukraine, Belarus, Kazakhstan
- Koeleria embergeri – Morocco
- Koeleria eriostachya – Eurasia from Switzerland to Kazakhstan
- Koeleria fueguina – Chile, Argentina
- Koeleria glauca – Eurasia from France to Mongolia
- Koeleria gubanovii – Amur Oblast in Russia
- Koeleria hirsuta – central Alps (Italy, Switzerland, Austria)
- Koeleria × hungarica – Czech Republic, Romania, Bulgaria
- Koeleria inaequaliglumis – Argentina (Mendoza)
- Koeleria insubrica – Italy, Croatia
- Koeleria karavajevii – Yakutia
- Koeleria kurtzii – Chile, Argentina, Bolivia, Peru
- Koeleria loweana – Madeira
- Koeleria lucana – Basilicata region of Italy
- Koeleria luerssenii – Caucasus
- Koeleria macrantha – Eurasia, North America
- Koeleria mendocinensis – Argentina
- Koeleria micrathera – Argentina, Chile incl Juan Fernández Is
- Koeleria × mixta – Great Britain
- Koeleria nitidula – Balkans, Turkey, Syria, Iran, Caucasus, Afghanistan
- Koeleria novozelandica – New Zealand
- Koeleria permollis – Falkland Is, Argentina, Chile, Uruguay, Bolivia, Peru
- Koeleria praeandina – Argentina (Mendoza)
- Koeleria pyramidata – Eurasia from France + Denmark to Nepal + Yakutia
- Koeleria rhodopea – Bulgaria
- Koeleria riguorum – New Zealand South I
- Koeleria skrjabinii – Yakutia
- Koeleria splendens – Mediterranean from Spain + Morocco to Turkey
- Koeleria thonii – Irkutsk, Krasnoyarsk
- Koeleria tzvelevii – Zabaykalsky Krai
- Koeleria vallesiana – Europe, North Africa
- Koeleria ventanicola – Argentina (Buenos Aires)
- Koeleria vurilochensis – Argentina (Chubut, Neuquén, Río Negro, Santa Cruz)

Formerly included

hundreds of species once included in Koeleria but now considered better suited to other genera including Aeluropus, Agrostis, Colpodium, Dactylis, Erioneuron, Festuca, Graphephorum, Rostraria, Schismus, Sesleria, Trisetaria and Trisetum.
