= Hartmaniella oxyphylla =

Scientific classification
- Kingdom: Plantae
- Clade: Tracheophytes
- Clade: Angiosperms
- Clade: Eudicots
- Order: Caryophyllales
- Family: Caryophyllaceae
- Genus: Hartmaniella
- Species: H. oxyphylla

Binomial name
- Hartmaniella oxyphylla (B.L.Rob.) M.L.Zhang

Synonyms
- Alsine oxyphylla (B.L.Rob.) A.Heller; Pseudostellaria oxyphylla (B.L.Rob.) R.L.Hartm. & Rabeler; Stellaria oxyphylla B.L. Rob.

Species of flowering plant

Hartmaniella oxyphylla, the robust starwort or Robinson's starwort, is a rare species of plant endemic to the north-western United States, where it is known only from Kootenai and Shoshone Counties, Idaho. It grows along stream-banks in conifer forests at elevations of 800–900 m.

== Description ==
Hartmaniella oxyphylla is an annual herb with fibrous roots. Stems are 4-angled, up to 30 cm long, with a thin line of hairs along one side. Leaves are narrow, up to 12 cm long. Flowers have green sepals and white petals.
