= Hartmaniella =

Hartmaniella may refer to:

- Hartmaniella (polychaete), a genus of annelids in the family Hartmaniellidae
- Hartmaniella (plant), a genus of plants in the family Caryophyllaceae
