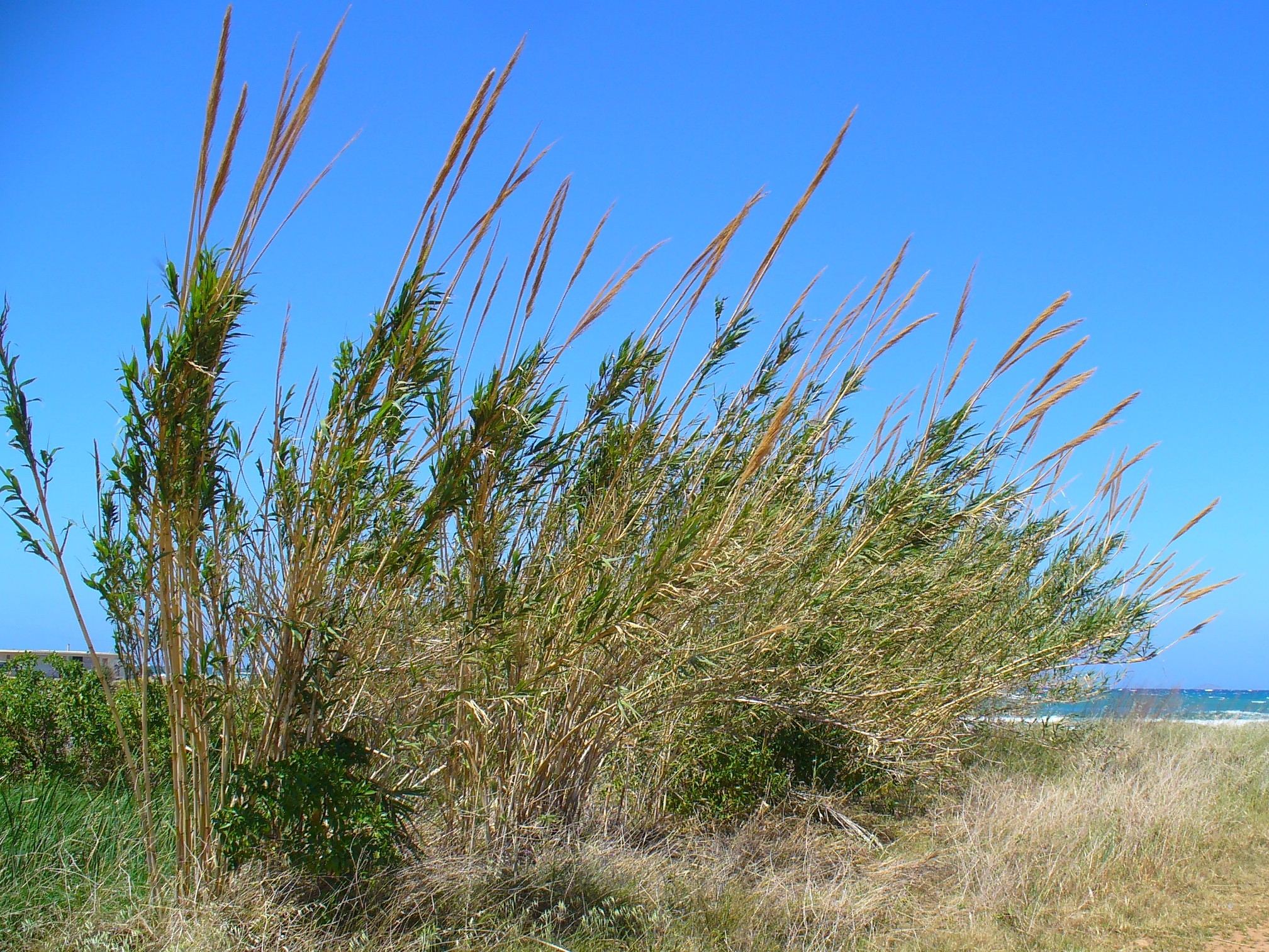
- Giant cane (Arundo donax)

Scientific classification
- Kingdom: Plantae
- Clade: Tracheophytes
- Clade: Angiosperms
- Clade: Monocots
- Clade: Commelinids
- Order: Poales
- Family: Poaceae
- Subfamily: Arundinoideae
- Tribe: Arundineae
- Genus: Arundo; Tourn. ex L.

Type species
- Arundo donax L.

Synonyms
- Donax P.Beauv. 1812, illegitimate homonym not Lour. 1790; Eudonax Fr.; Scolochloa Mert. & W.D.J.Koch; Amphidonax Nees; Donacium Fr.

= Arundo =

Arundo Temporal range: 83.6–0 Ma Late Cretaceous–Recent

Genus of grasses

Arundo is a genus of stout, perennial plants in the grass family Poaceae.

== Description ==
Arundo is native to southern Europe, North Africa, and much of temperate Asia as far east as Japan. They grow to 3–6 m tall, occasionally to 10 m, with leaves 30–60 cm long and 3–6 cm broad.

== Species ==
Five species are accepted by the Plants of the World Online database:

- Arundo donaciformis (Loisel.) Hardion, Verlaque & B.Vila – southeast France, northwest Italy
- Arundo donax L. (Giant cane, Spanish cane) – southeast Mediterranean east through southern Asia to Japan; naturalised in many additional areas and often invasive)
- Arundo formosana Hack. – Nansei-shoto, Taiwan, Philippines
- Arundo micrantha Lam. – Mediterranean region
- Arundo plinii Turra (Pliny's reed) – Greece, Italy, Albania, Croatia

Over 200 species were formerly considered part of Arundo but now treated in other genera, including: Achnatherum, Agrostis, Ammophila, Ampelodesmos, Arthrostylidium, Arundinaria, Austroderia, Bambusa, Calamagrostis, Calammophila, Calamovilfa, Chionochloa, Chusquea, Cinna, Cortaderia, Dendrocalamus, Deschampsia, Dupontia, Gastridium, Gigantochloa, Graphephorum, Gynerium, Imperata, Indocalamus, Melica, Miscanthus, Molinia, Muhlenbergia, Neyraudia, Phalaris, Phragmites, Poa, Psammochloa, Rytidosperma, Saccharum, Schizostachyum, Scolochloa, Stipa, Thysanolaena, Trisetaria.

== See also ==
- List of Poaceae genera
