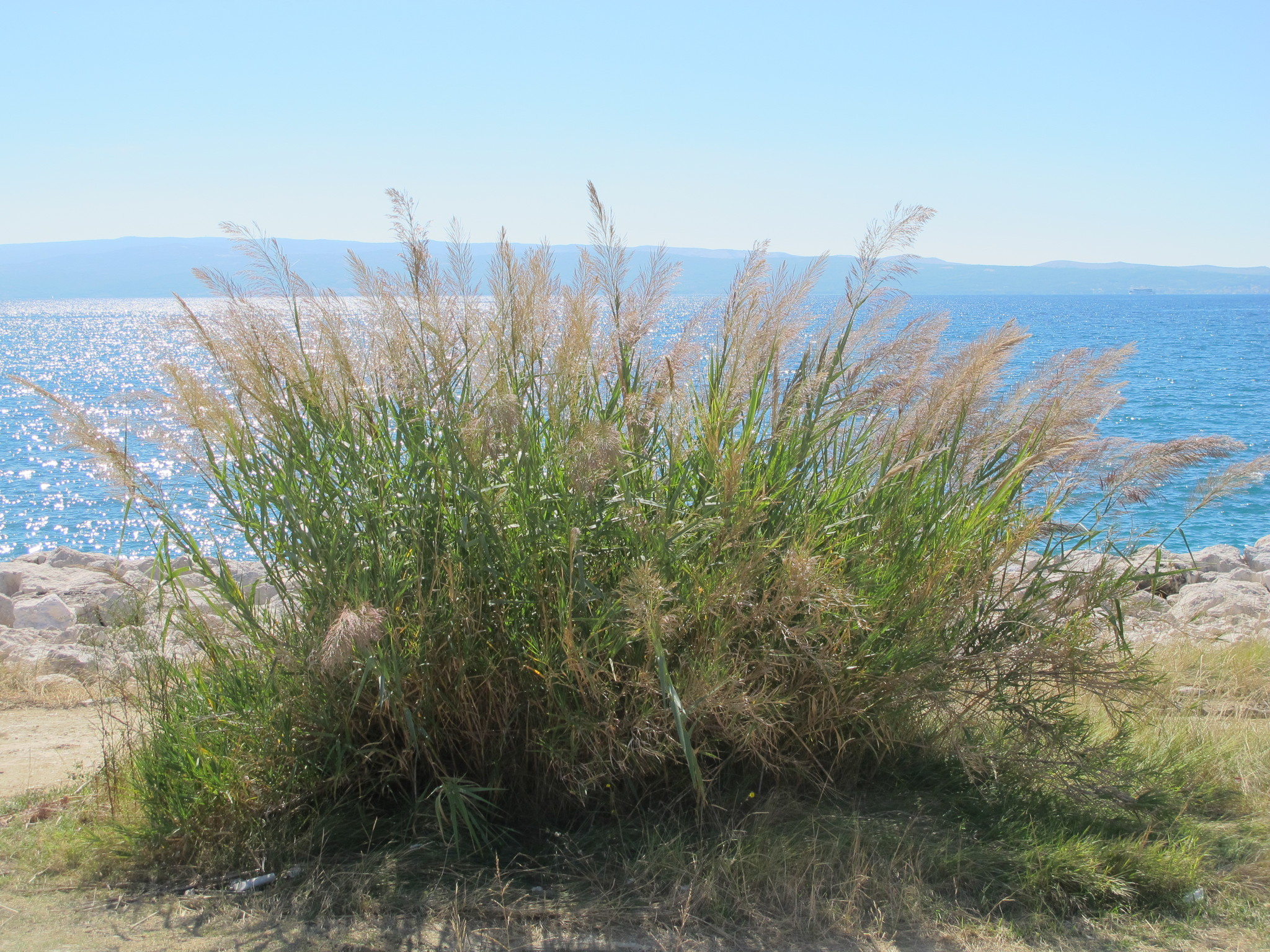
- In Croatia

Scientific classification
- Kingdom: Plantae
- Clade: Embryophytes
- Clade: Tracheophytes
- Clade: Angiosperms
- Clade: Monocots
- Clade: Commelinids
- Order: Poales
- Family: Poaceae
- Genus: Arundo
- Species: A. plinii

Binomial name
- Arundo plinii Turra

Synonyms
- Calamagrostis plinii (Turra) J.F.Gmel.; Donax plinii (Turra) K.Koch; Arundo collina Ten.; Arundo hellenica Danin, Raus & H.Scholz; Arundo semifurcta Steud.; Calamagrostis altissima Host; Donax acuminatus J.Presl ex Steud.; Donax collinus (Ten.) Tineo

= Arundo plinii =

Species of plant

Arundo plinii is a species of herb in the family Poaceae (true grasses). It is native to southern Europe, Lebanon and Syria.

== Sources ==
This article incorporates text from a free content work. Licensed under CC0 (license statement/permission). Text taken from Arundo plinii. Encyclopedia of Life.
