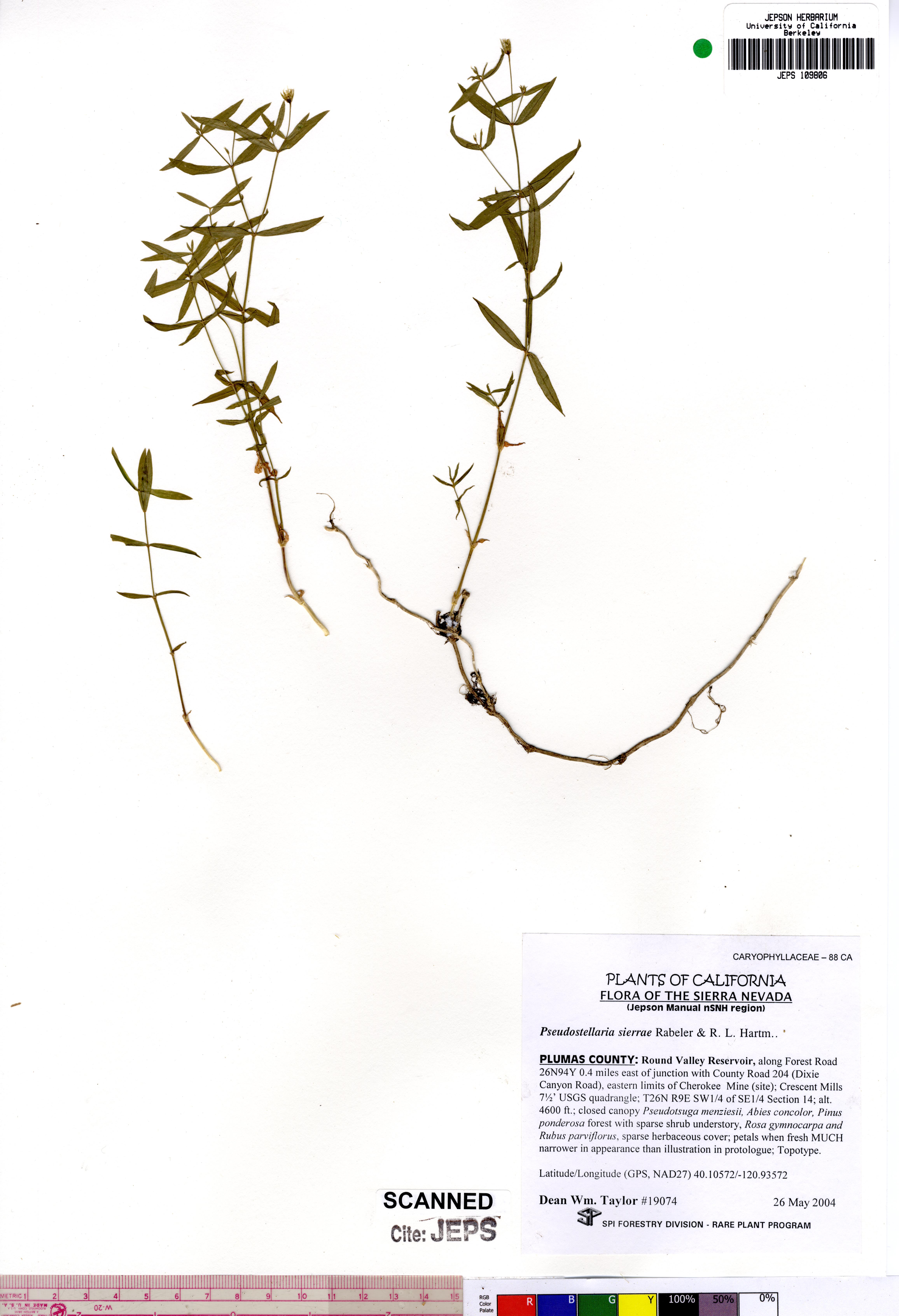

Scientific classification
- Kingdom: Plantae
- Clade: Embryophytes
- Clade: Tracheophytes
- Clade: Spermatophytes
- Clade: Angiosperms
- Clade: Eudicots
- Order: Caryophyllales
- Family: Caryophyllaceae
- Genus: Hartmaniella
- Species: H. sierrae

Binomial name
- Hartmaniella sierrae (Rabeler & R.L.Hartm.) M.L.Zhang

Synonyms
- Pseudostellaria sierrae Rabeler & R.L.Hartm.

= Hartmaniella sierrae =

Species of flowering plant

Hartmaniella sierrae, commonly known as Sierra starwort, is a species of flowering plant in the family Caryophyllaceae.

== Description ==
Hartmaniella sierrae is a perennial herb growing from a rhizome network with vertical, thick-tipped roots. The stem is hairless and grows up to about 27 centimeters in maximum height. The lance-shaped leaves are up to 3 centimeters long and hairless but rough along the edges.

The inflorescence is a solitary flower at the tip of the stem, or arising from an upper leaf axil. The flower has five white petals, each with a sharp, narrow notch in the tip. There are five long stamens with yellow anthers.

== Distribution ==
Hartmaniella sierrae is endemic to the western United States, where it is only known from the woodlands and forests of the Sierra Nevada, California. It was first collected before 1900 but not described to science until 2002.
