= Koeleria loweana =

Scientific classification
- Kingdom: Plantae
- Clade: Tracheophytes
- Clade: Angiosperms
- Clade: Monocots
- Clade: Commelinids
- Order: Poales
- Family: Poaceae
- Subfamily: Pooideae
- Genus: Koeleria
- Species: K. loweana

Binomial name
- Koeleria loweana Quintanar, Catalán & Castrov.

Species of flowering plant

Koeleria loweana is a species of grass native to the Madeira archipelago in the north Atlantic Ocean.
