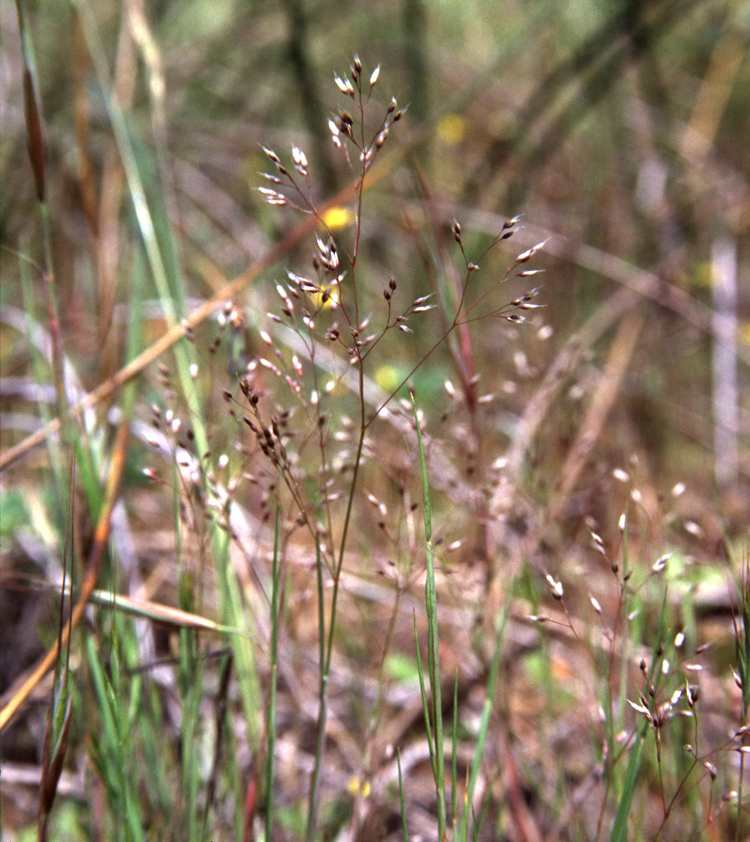

Scientific classification
- Kingdom: Plantae
- Clade: Tracheophytes
- Clade: Angiosperms
- Clade: Monocots
- Clade: Commelinids
- Order: Poales
- Family: Poaceae
- Subfamily: Pooideae
- Genus: Aira
- Species: A. caryophyllea

Binomial name
- Aira caryophyllea L.

= Aira caryophyllea =

Species of grass

Aira caryophyllea is a species of grass known by the common name silver hairgrass. It's a species of bunchgrass that is native to Europe, Africa, and Asia. It has been introduced to other continents, including North America, where it is naturalized and common.

Aira caryophyllea is a light green grass with a silvery sheen on its spikelets before it dries and becomes straw-colored to white. The spikelets are borne on a spreading panicle inflorescence.
