= Colpodium chionogeiton =

Conservation status
- Vulnerable (IUCN 3.1)

Scientific classification
- Kingdom: Plantae
- Clade: Tracheophytes
- Clade: Angiosperms
- Clade: Monocots
- Clade: Commelinids
- Order: Poales
- Family: Poaceae
- Subfamily: Pooideae
- Genus: Colpodium
- Species: C. chionogeiton

Binomial name
- Colpodium chionogeiton (Pilg.) Tzvel.

Species of grass

Colpodium chionogeiton is a species of grass in the family Poaceae. It is found in Kenya and Tanzania. Its natural habitat is alpine wetlands.
