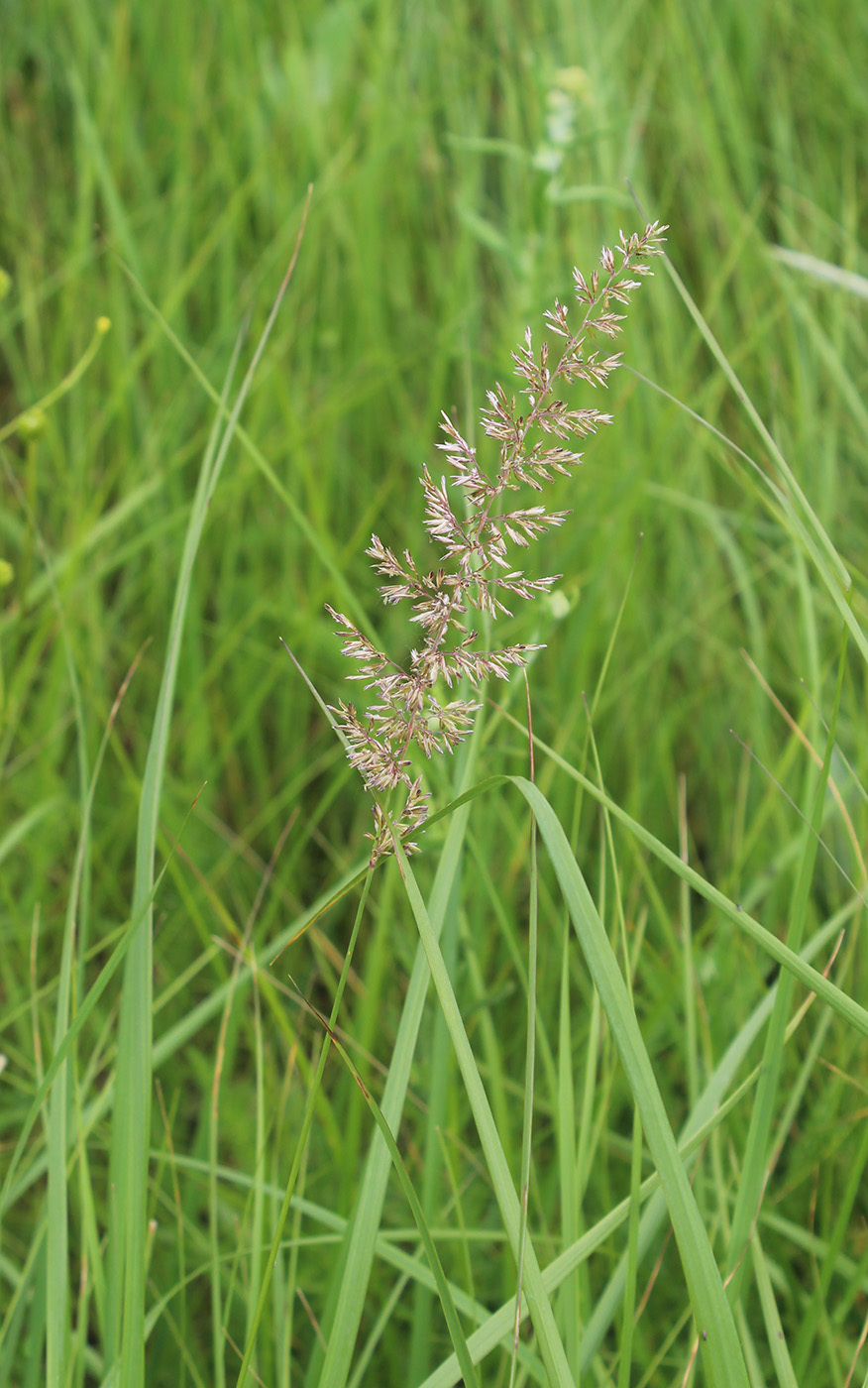

Scientific classification
- Kingdom: Plantae
- Clade: Tracheophytes
- Clade: Angiosperms
- Clade: Monocots
- Clade: Commelinids
- Order: Poales
- Family: Poaceae
- Subfamily: Pooideae
- Genus: Koeleria
- Species: K. delavignei

Binomial name
- Koeleria delavignei Czern. ex Domin

= Koeleria delavignei =

Species of grass

Koeleria delavignei is a species of grass in the family Poaceae.

Its native range is Eastern Europe to Siberia.
