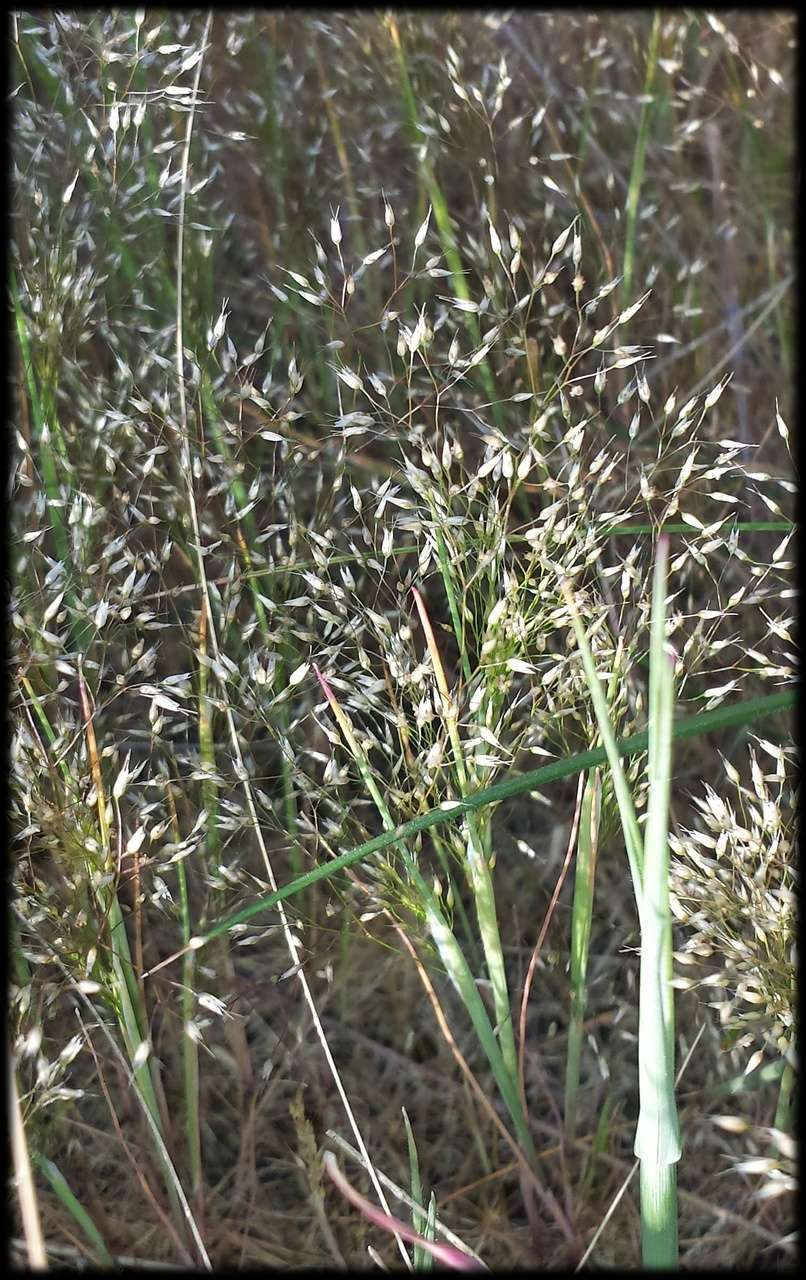

Scientific classification
- Kingdom: Plantae
- Clade: Embryophytes
- Clade: Tracheophytes
- Clade: Angiosperms
- Clade: Monocots
- Clade: Commelinids
- Order: Poales
- Family: Poaceae
- Subfamily: Pooideae
- Genus: Aira
- Species: A. elegans

Binomial name
- Aira elegans Willd.

Synonyms
- List: Airella capillaris (Mert. & W.D.J.Koch) Dumort.; Airopsis capillaris (Mert. & W.D.J.Koch) Schur; Airopsis elegans (Willd.) Fr. & D.Müll.; Aspris capillaris (Mert. & W.D.J.Koch) Hitchc.; Avena capillaris Mert. & W.D.J.Koch; Fussia capillaris (Mert. & W.D.J.Koch) Schur; Aira byzantina F.Albers; Aira elegantissima Schur; Aira notarisiana Steud.; Aira saxatilis Salzm. ex Trin.; Arundinella ravii Shaju & N.Mohanan

= Aira elegans =

Species of plant

Aira elegans is a species of plant in the family Poaceae. It is commonly known as Mediterranean hairgrass, elegant hairgrass and the annual silver hairgrass. It is native to Europe, North Africa, Western Asia and the Caucasus.
