= × Pucciphippsia vacillans =

Scientific classification
- Kingdom: Plantae
- Clade: Tracheophytes
- Clade: Angiosperms
- Clade: Monocots
- Clade: Commelinids
- Order: Poales
- Family: Poaceae
- Subfamily: Pooideae
- Genus: × Pucciphippsia
- Species: × P. vacillans

Binomial name
- × Pucciphippsia vacillans (Th.Fr.) Tzvelev

Member of the nothogenus × Pucciphippsia

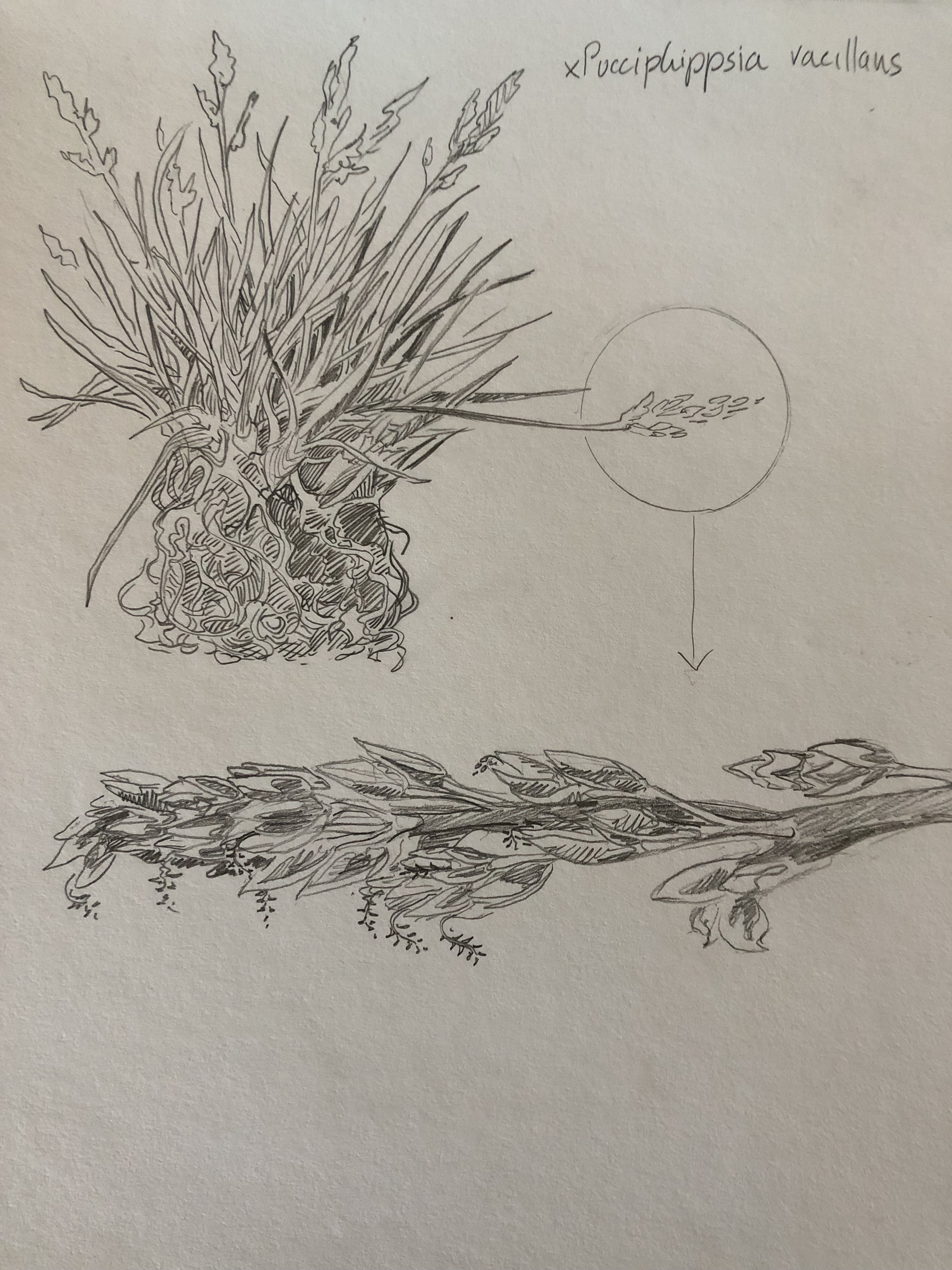
xPucciphippsia vacillans: whole plant and inflorescence

× Pucciphippsia vacillans is a member of the nothogenus × Pucciphippsia, formed by the hybridization of Phippsia and Puccinellia. It is a small, perennial grass, which is native to the arctic and grows well in wet conditions. × Pucciphippsia vacillans is entirely sterile, polyploid, and can only be formed as a product of hybridization. There has been difficulty in defining × Pucciphippsia vacillans parent species, and this may be representative broader difficulties in understanding species delineations and phylogenetics among arctic flora.

== Morphology ==
× Pucciphippsia vacillans is a grass (Poaceae). The plant is perennial, growing between 15 and 23 centimeters in height. × P. vacillans is caespitose, meaning it grows dense and low, forming a thick mat. The caespitose growth form is a common adaptation among arctic flora because the air temperature very close to the ground is slightly warmer. This tiny difference in temperature matters greatly when summer temperatures barely exceed what is needed for metabolic reactions to occur. The plant has fibrous roots and sheathing leaves which grow alternately along the stem. The leaves are smooth. Sheath collars (narrow bands where the leaf blade meets the sheath) and ligules are present. Each leaf blade is 30 to 80 mm long. × P. vacillans is a monocot, and therefore the leaves have parallel venation. There is a distinct mid-vein running down the center of each leaf blade.

Each plant has two or more flowering stems and panicle inflorescences. The panicles are usually tinged purple. Each panicle is composed of spikelets, and the spikelets each contain one or more floret. The florets are bilaterally symmetrical and bisexual. Like many grass species, the florets are not showy. The perianth is formed by lodicules (a pair of small, scale like, modified petals which help to push open the flower). Each flower has a superior compound ovary, formed from three fused carpels, and each carpel contains a single ovule. The flowers also contain three anthers, however these anthers are shriveled and non-functional. Because of this, the ovary never matures into a fruit, making P. vacillans sterile and only produced as a product of hybridization.

× Pucciphippsia vacillans is easily confused with Phippsia algida, but × P. vacillans has longer leaf blades (Phippsia algida has leaf blades from 8 to 20 mm), more than one floret per spikelet, and panicles with ascending, rather than erect, branches.

== Distribution and habitat ==
× Pucciphippsia vacillans is native to the arctic, an environment defined by freezing temperatures, permafrost, and long sunless winters. Relatively limited observations of it may be due to its scarcity or to its obscurity and the fact that in grows in parts of the world where there is very little human inhabitation. It was thought to be limited to Svalbard (Norway) and Novaya Zemlya (Russia), until it was observed on a variety of islands in Nunavut (Canada) and in Greenland (Denmark). The freezing climate of the arctic has defined and severely limited the evolution of arctic flora, but it is also warming at nearly twice the rate of the global average due to climate change which may impact the habitat and range of × Pucciphippsia vacillans in the future.

× Pucciphippsia vacillans grows in wet meadows, around the edges of ponds, and in seepage zones. It generally grows well in areas that are permanently or frequently wet, often in fine grained gravel or moist to wet thick moss carpets.

== Evidence for hybridization ==
Hybridization is relatively common among grasses and often associated with polyploidy. Genetic analysis has shown × P. vacillans to be triploid. Additionally, no mature fruits produced by × P. vacillans have been observed, the anthers have not been observed to contain any pollen, and the ovaries are frequently atrophied. That × P. vacillans is likely sterile provides strong support for the hypothesis that it is a hybrid species. Since it was first recognized in 1869, the identity of the parent species of × P. vacillans have been disputed. Because P. vacillans is triploid, it is likely that is the product of the hybridization of a diploid species and tetraploid species. Genetic analysis has shown × P. vacillans to be very closely related to Phippsia algida (tetraploid), Phippsia concinna (tetraploid), and Puccinellia vahliana (diploid), meaning that Puccinellia vahliana is likely one parent. Statistical analysis of morphology has shown that × P. vacillans is an intermediate between Phippsia algida and Puccinellia vahliana, making Phippsia algida the most likely second parent, rather than Phippsia concinna. Due to their similar morphology, habitat, and reproduction and dispersal methods, there is dispute as to whether P. concinna and P. algida are different species at all, however their distinct phylogeographies support their recognition as distinct species.

== Difficulties in species delineation ==
The case of P. vacillans is somewhat representative of the broader difficulties in understanding phylogenies and species delineations among arctic flora and the Pooideae subfamily. Although the Arctic is considered to have low plant species diversity, arctic flora show high diversity within species and among populations. There are few pollinators in the arctic, and glaciation fragments ranges, resulting in frequent reproductive isolation and small, disjoint populations within species. Subject to strong genetic drift, within less than 500 generations these isolated populations can develop into their own incipient species, incapable of producing viable offspring with plants from other populations. There is thought to be high biological species diversity within taxonomically recognized species of arctic flora. Hybridization is also common among arctic flora and often results in polyploidy. Frequent reproductive isolation and hybridization makes species delineations difficult to define. Additionally, the subfamily of which × P. vacillans is a member of (Pooideae) has been shown to have deep phylogenetic incongruence. All this, along with P. vacillans relative obscurity, may explain why there is still uncertainty about the precise origin of × Pucciphippsia vacillans.
