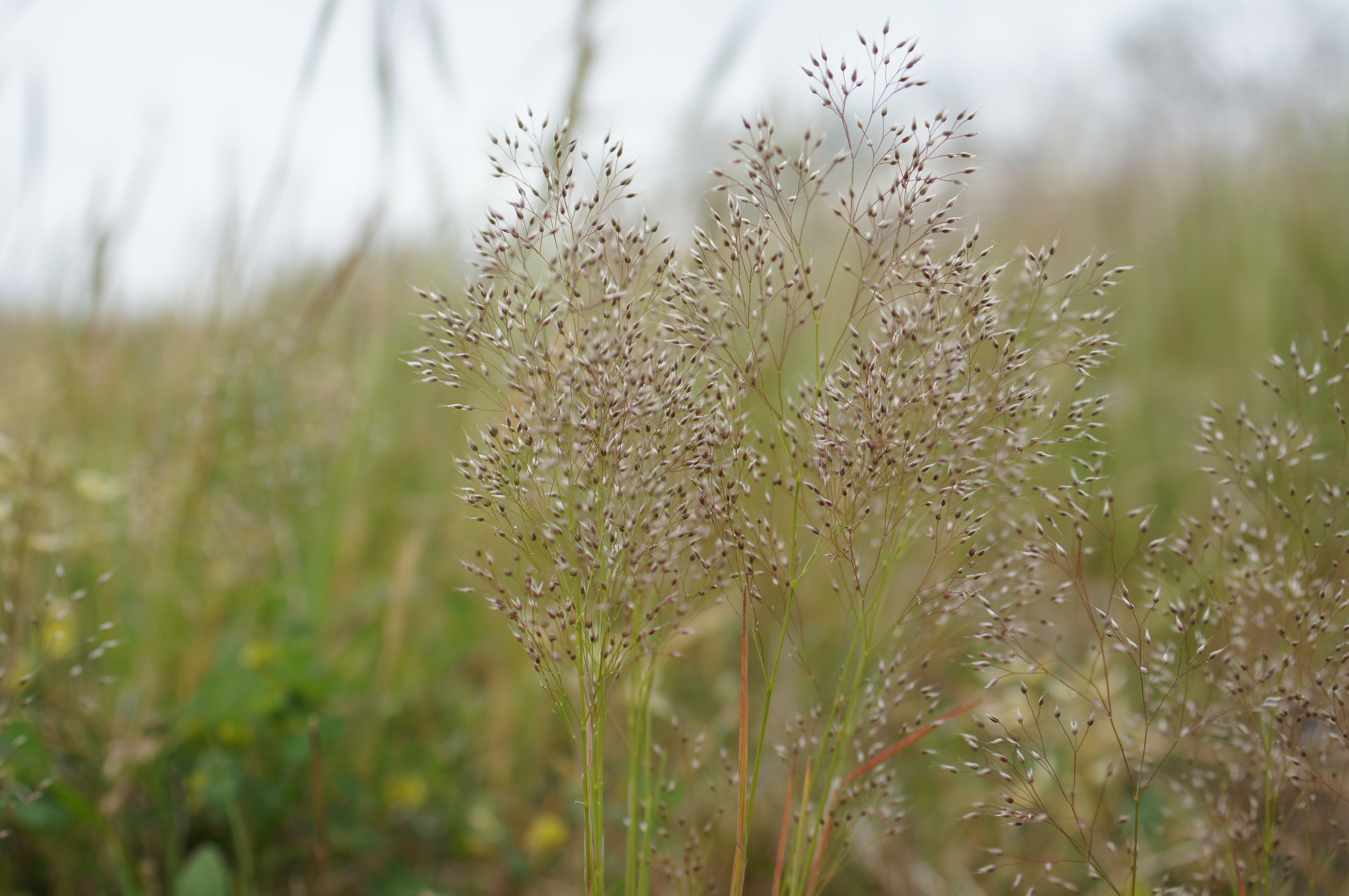

Scientific classification
- Kingdom: Plantae
- Clade: Embryophytes
- Clade: Tracheophytes
- Clade: Angiosperms
- Clade: Monocots
- Clade: Commelinids
- Order: Poales
- Family: Poaceae
- Subfamily: Pooideae
- Genus: Aira
- Species: A. cupaniana

Binomial name
- Aira cupaniana Guss.

Synonyms
- Airella cupaniana (Guss.) Dumort.; Airopsis cupaniana (Guss.) Lange; Avena cupaniana (Guss.) Nyman; Aira lutescens Lojac.; Aira sorrentinoi Lojac.

= Aira cupaniana =

Species of plant

Aira cupaniana (silver hairgrass) is a species of annual herb in the family Poaceae. They have a self-supporting growth form and simple, broad leaves. Individuals can grow to 13 cm. The species is native to southern Europe, North Africa and the Canary Islands. It is an introduced species in Australia.

== Sources ==
This article incorporates text from a free content work. Licensed under CC0 (license statement/permission). Text taken from Aira cupaniana. Encyclopedia of Life.
