= Adamova Manor =

Manor house in Latvia

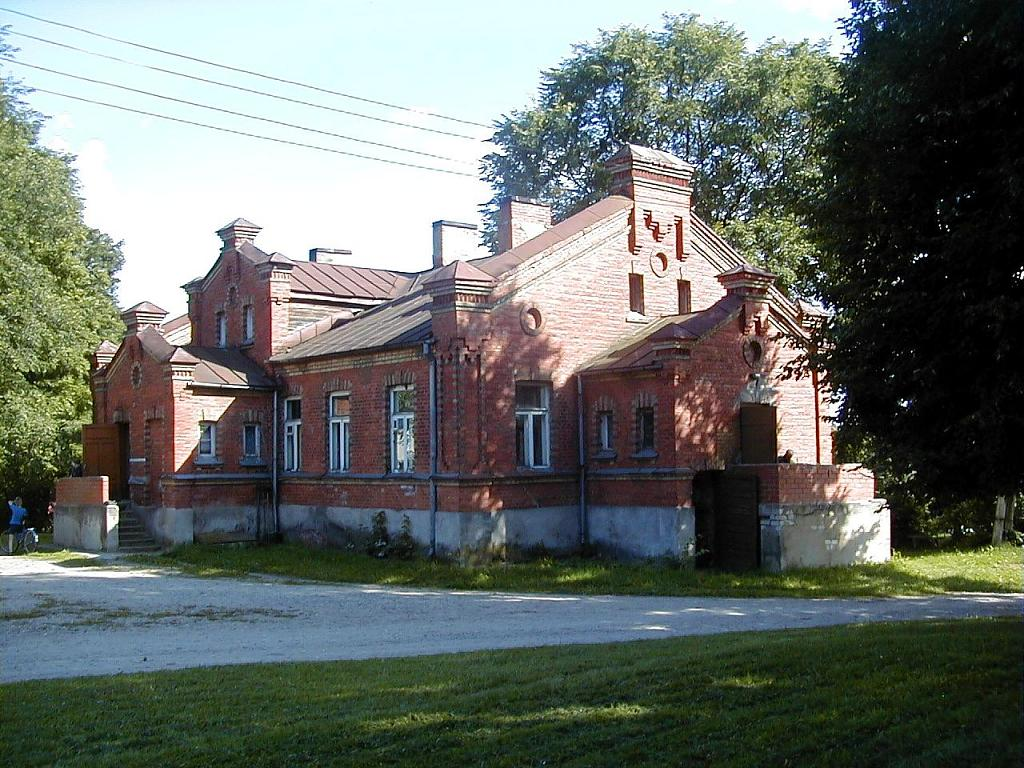
- Adamova Manor

- Location within Latvia
- Interactive map of the Adamova Manor area

General information
- Architectural style: Empire style
- Location: Latgale, Latvia
- Coordinates: 56°33′40.6″N 27°22′09.5″E
- Completed: 1851

Adamova Manor (Latvian: Adamovas muižas pils, German: Adamhof, Latgalian: Odumova, Polish: Adamowa ) is a manor house in Vērēmi Parish, Rēzekne Municipality built in 1851 in the historical region of Latgale, in Latvia on the shores of Adamova Lake.

== History ==
There are reports of the manor dating from the first half of the 18th century. Previously it belonged to the noble family of von Korff from Courland. In 1866 it was owned by Peter Nodhaft. In the 19th century, the manor still belonged to Natalia Sergeyevna Zemchzhzhnikova (1841-1913), who was the niece of the Dekabrist prince Yevgeny Petrovich Obolensky. Approximately in 1898 the manor was acquired by General Karaulov. At the beginning of the 20th century, Elena Nikolaevna Karaulova owned the property. When German troops occupied Latgale in the winter of 1918 in course of World War I during operation Faustschlag, the 13th Brigade Headquarters of the German occupation troops was stationed in the Adamova Manor until 1919. The first school, an orphanage, was opened on the territory of the Adamova Manor in 1940. It is now called the Adamova Sanatorium Boarding School.

== Mineral water ==
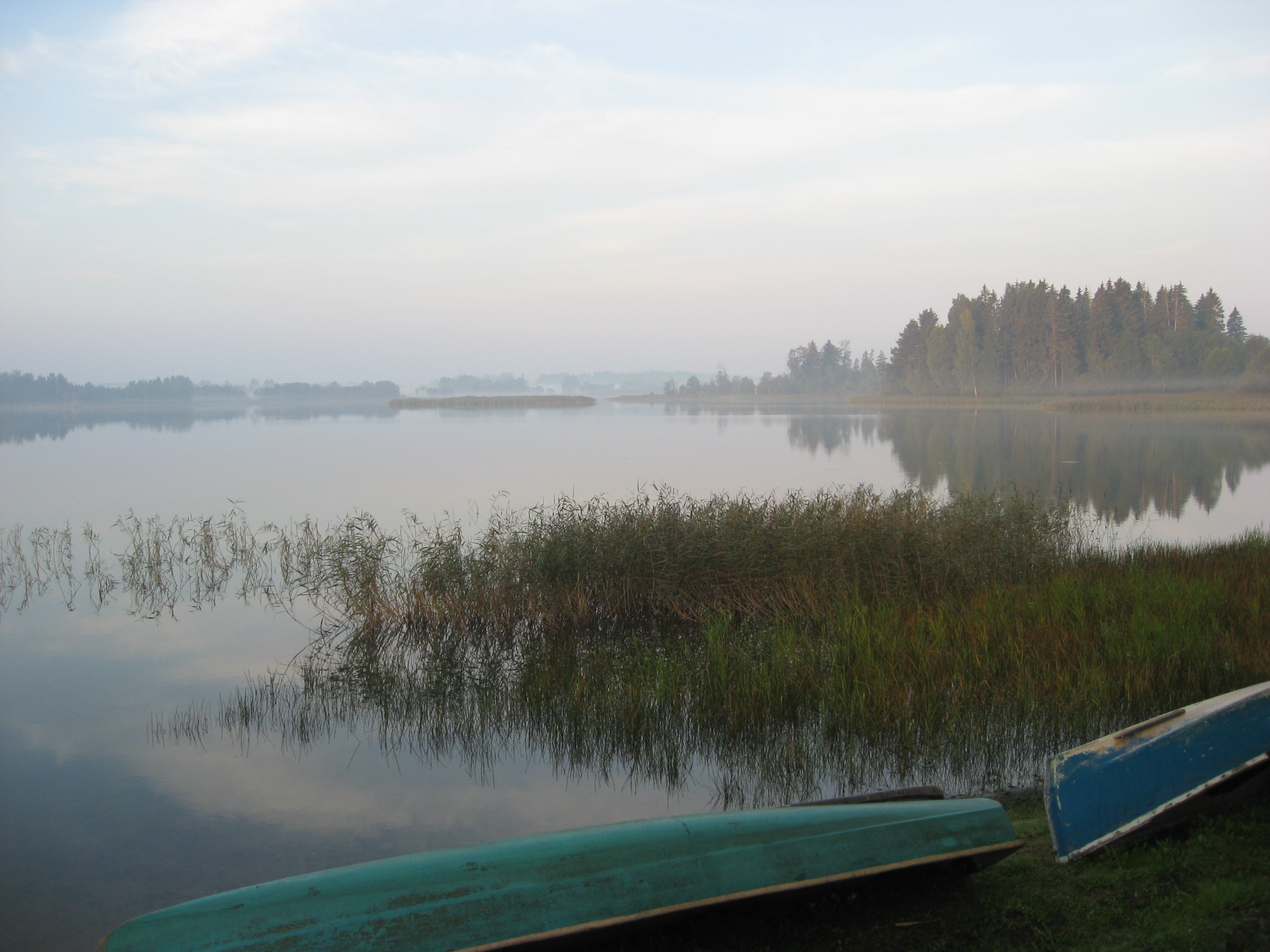
Daybreak at Adamova Lake

In 1905, a mineral spring named after St. Helena was discovered in Adamova Manor. Mineral water won top honors at the London Exhibitions in 1912 and Paris in 1913. At present the source of mineral water in Adamova estate is no longer found.

== See also ==
- List of palaces and manor houses in Latvia
