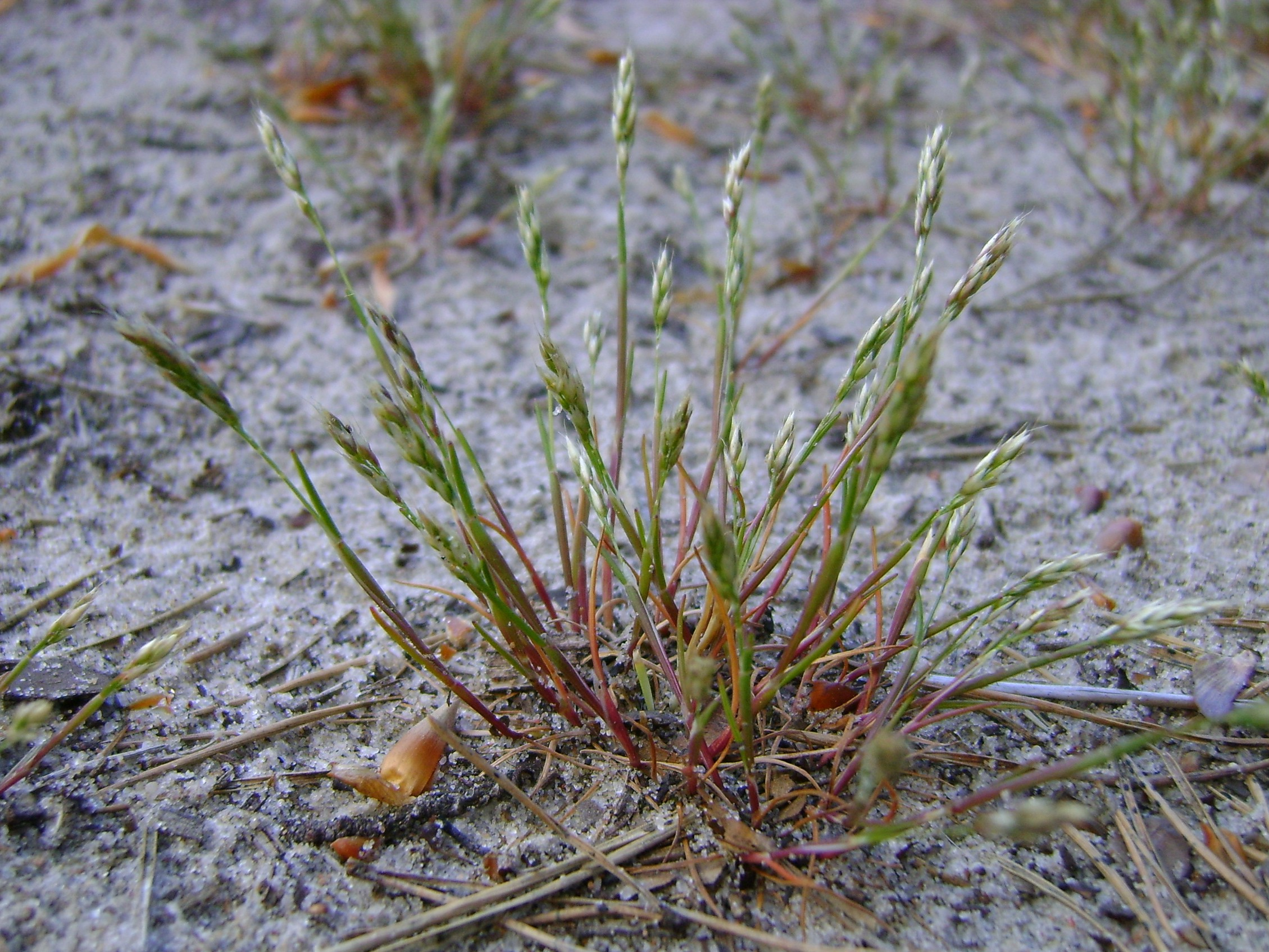

Scientific classification
- Kingdom: Plantae
- Clade: Tracheophytes
- Clade: Angiosperms
- Clade: Monocots
- Clade: Commelinids
- Order: Poales
- Family: Poaceae
- Subfamily: Pooideae
- Genus: Aira
- Species: A. praecox

Binomial name
- Aira praecox L.

Synonyms
- Aspris praecox

= Aira praecox =

Species of grass

Aira praecox is a species of grass known by several common names, including early hair-grass, yellow hairgrass and spike hairgrass. It is native to Europe, where it is found in dry, sandy places, on rocky outcrops, and in heath grassland. It also grows in North America as an introduced species, where it can be found on the east and west coasts in sandy or rocky areas, such as beaches and roadsides. This is a tuft-forming annual grass growing up to about 10 to 15 centimeters in maximum height. The thin, narrow leaves are located at the base of the stem, and are typically 0.3–2 millimeters wide. It bears small, tightly congested inflorescences of purple-tinted green bisexual spikelets.

It is an annual, forming low and small but numerous tufts. It flowers from April to June.

Certain moths and butterflies, including the Grayling butterfly and the Coast Dart moth, feed on it as larvae.
