= Colpodium hedbergii =

Conservation status
- Vulnerable (IUCN 3.1)

Scientific classification
- Kingdom: Plantae
- Clade: Tracheophytes
- Clade: Angiosperms
- Clade: Monocots
- Clade: Commelinids
- Order: Poales
- Family: Poaceae
- Subfamily: Pooideae
- Genus: Colpodium
- Species: C. hedbergii

Binomial name
- Colpodium hedbergii (Melderis) Tzvelev

Synonyms
- Keniochloa hedbergii Melderis

Species of grass

Colpodium hedbergii is a species of grass belonging to the family Poaceae. It is found only in Kenya. Its natural habitats are rivers and alpine wetlands.
