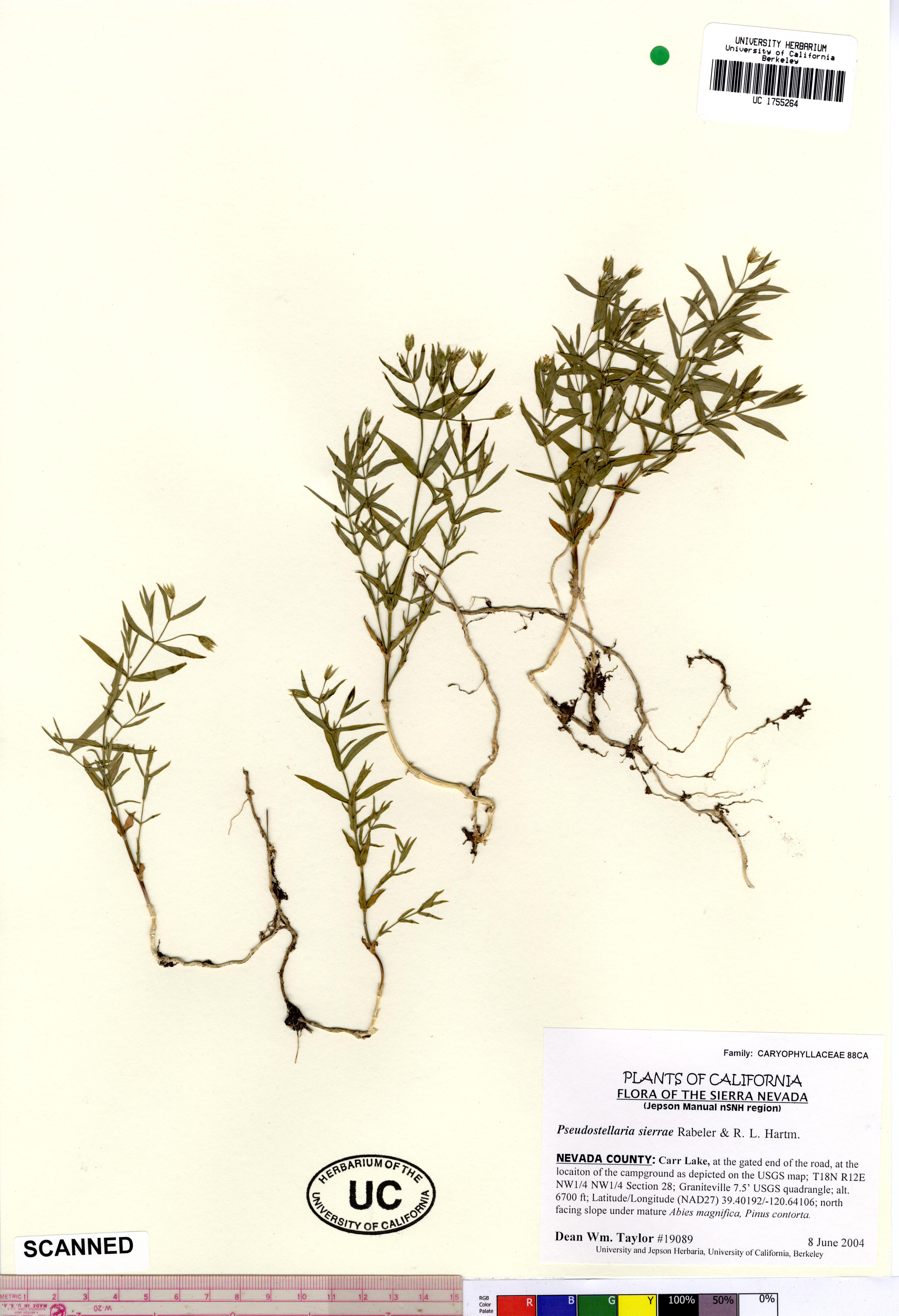

Scientific classification
- Kingdom: Plantae
- Clade: Tracheophytes
- Clade: Angiosperms
- Clade: Eudicots
- Order: Caryophyllales
- Family: Caryophyllaceae
- Genus: Hartmaniella; M.L.Zhang & Rabeler

= Hartmaniella (plant) =

Genus of plants

Hartmaniella is a genus of flowering plants belonging to the family Caryophyllaceae.

Its native range is Western USA. It was separated from Pseudostellaria in 2017.

Species:

- Hartmaniella oxyphylla (B.L.Rob.) M.L.Zhang
- Hartmaniella sierrae (Rabeler & R.L.Hartm.) M.L.Zhang
