= × Pucciphippsia =

Scientific classification
- Kingdom: Plantae
- Clade: Tracheophytes
- Clade: Angiosperms
- Clade: Monocots
- Clade: Commelinids
- Order: Poales
- Family: Poaceae
- Subfamily: Pooideae
- Subtribe: Coleanthinae
- Genus: × Pucciphippsia; Tzvelev

Synonyms
- Maltea B.Boivin

Nothogenus of grasses

× Pucciphippsia is a nothogenus of Arctic plants in the grass family, reported from Greenland, Svalbard, and Magadan. The nothogenus is derived from a hybridization between Phippsia and Puccinellia.

Species

- × Pucciphippsia czukczorum Tzvelev - Magadan Oblast (part of the Russian Federation)
- × Pucciphippsia vacillans (Th.Fr.) Tzvelev - Greenland (part of Denmark), Svalbard (part of Norway)

== See also ==
- List of Poaceae genera
