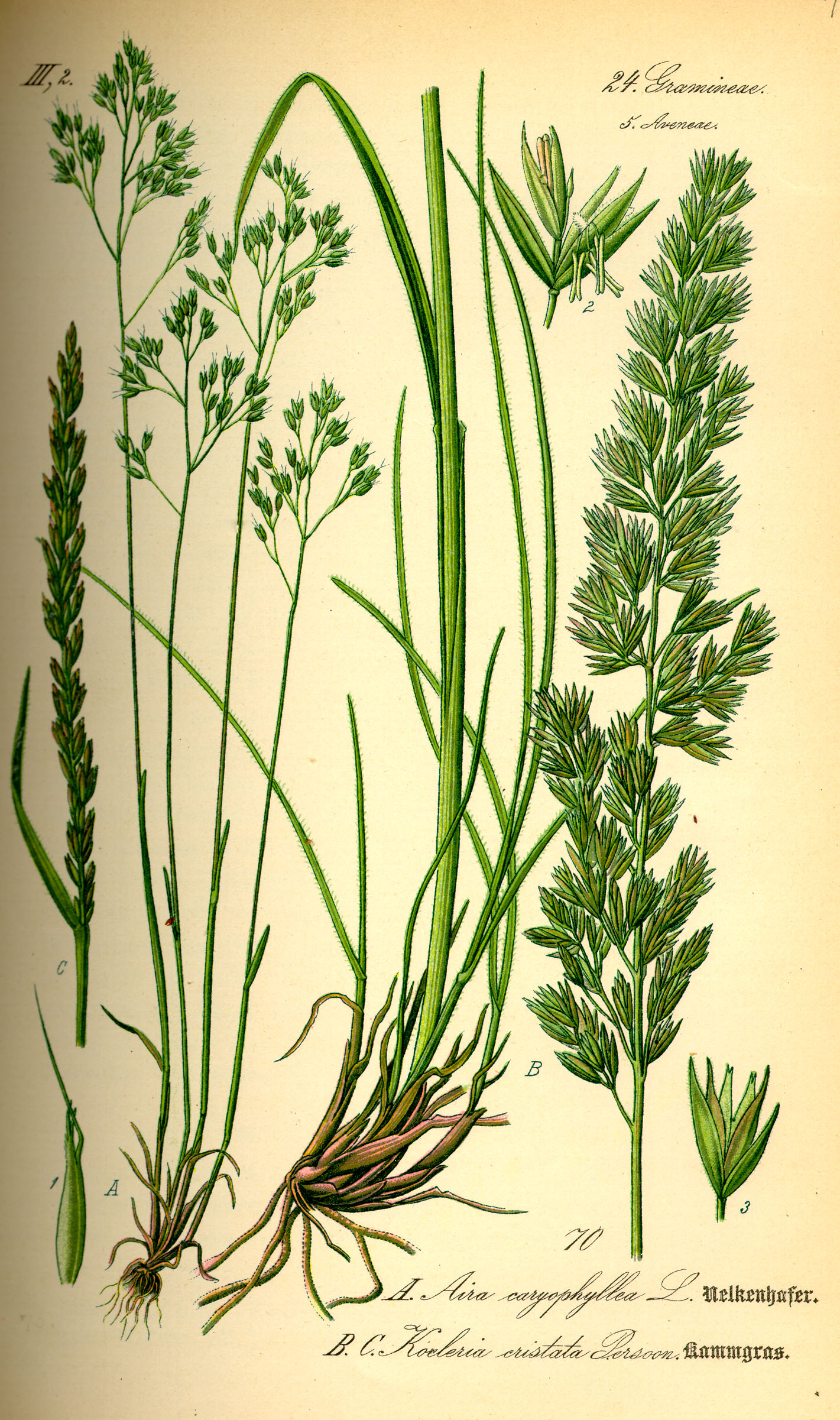
- Koeleria pyramidata (figure B at right)

Scientific classification
- Kingdom: Plantae
- Clade: Tracheophytes
- Clade: Angiosperms
- Clade: Monocots
- Clade: Commelinids
- Order: Poales
- Family: Poaceae
- Subfamily: Pooideae
- Genus: Koeleria
- Species: K. pyramidata

Binomial name
- Koeleria pyramidata (Lam.) P.Beauv.

Synonyms
- Poa pyramidata Lam.; Koeleria cristata Pers.; Brachystylus cristatus Dulac; Koeleria mollis W.Mann ex Opiz; Koeleria grandis Gorski; Koeleria gigantea Besser ex Griseb.; Koeleria interrupta Schur; Dactylis paleacea L. ex Munro; Koeleria grandis Besser ex Nyman; Koeleria montana (Hausm.) Dalla Torre; Koeleria glabra Janka ex Nyman; Koeleria ciliata A.Kern. ex Domin; Koeleria polonica Domin; Koeleria exaltata Domin; Koeleria genevensis Domin; Koeleria tristis Domin; Koeleria kerneri Ujhelyi; Koeleria lamarckii Ujhelyi; Koeleria heribaudii Ujhelyi; Koeleria davidovii (Acht.) Kožuharov; Koeleria quadriflora (Domin) Tzvelev

= Koeleria pyramidata =

Species of grass

Koeleria pyramidata is a Eurasian plant species in the grass family. It is found in grasslands from France + Denmark to Nepal + Siberia.
