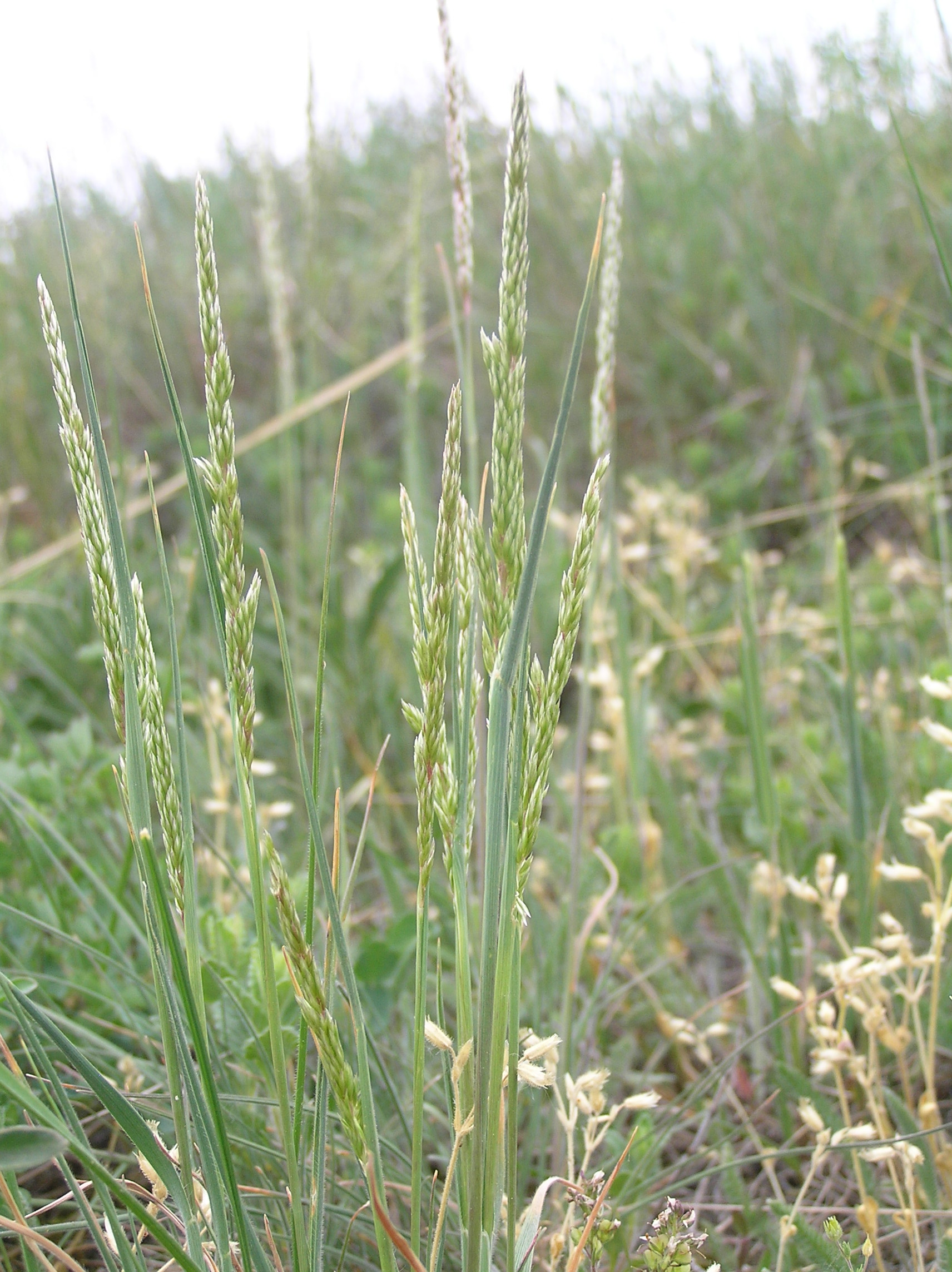
- Koeleria macrantha

Scientific classification
- Kingdom: Plantae
- Clade: Tracheophytes
- Clade: Angiosperms
- Clade: Monocots
- Clade: Commelinids
- Order: Poales
- Family: Poaceae
- Subfamily: Pooideae
- Genus: Koeleria
- Species: K. macrantha

Binomial name
- Koeleria macrantha (Ledeb.) Schult.

Synonyms
- List: Aira macrantha Ledeb.; Koeleria cristata var. macrantha (Ledeb.) Griseb.; Koeleria cristata subsp. macrantha (Ledeb.) Rothm.; Aira cristata L.; Poa cristata (L.) L.; Festuca cristata (L.) Vill.; Aira bulbosa Krock.; Melica gmelinii Roth; Poa nitida Lam.; Melica hirsuta Koeler; Koeleria gracilis Pers.; Dactylis cristata (L.) M.Bieb.; Poa aristata P.Beauv.; Koeleria albescens DC.; Aira gracilis Trin.; Koeleria parviflora Bertol. ex Schult.; Airochloa albescens (DC.) Link; Airochloa cristata (L.) Link; Aira dactyloides Rochel; Airochloa gracilis (Trin.) Link; Koeleria pallida Wallr.; Airochloa parviflora Nees; Koeleria albida Opiz; Koeleria fenzliana Schur; Koeleria transsilvanica Schur; Koeleria flexilis Janka; Koeleria ambigua Schur; Koeleria arkansana Nutt. ex Scribn.; Achaeta geniculata E.Fourn.; Koeleria pseudocristata Domin; Koeleria compacta Adamovic; Koeleria oregana Domin; Koeleria supra-arenaria Domin ex Druce; Koeleria tokiensis Domin; Koeleria alpigena Domin; Koeleria arctica Domin; Koeleria aschersoniana Domin; Koeleria australiensis Domin; Koeleria elegantula Domin; Koeleria helvetica Domin; Koeleria idahoensis Domin; Koeleria longifolia Nutt. ex Domin; Koeleria macrura Domin; Koeleria mukdenensis Domin; Koeleria poiformis Domin; Koeleria polyantha Domin; Koeleria pontarlieri Domin; Koeleria robinsoniana Domin; Koeleria seminuda (Trautv.) Domin; Koeleria soongarica Domin; Koeleria velenovskyi Domin; Koeleria intermedia Tourlet; Koeleria conglobata Velen.; Koeleria latifrons (Domin) Rydb.; Koeleria wolgensis P.A.Smirn.; Koeleria sclerophylla P.A.Smirn.; Koeleria sibirica (Domin) Gontsch.; Koeleria talievii Lavrenko; Koeleria yukonensis Hultén; Koeleria krylovii Reverd.; Koeleria janoensis Petrov & Karav. in M.N.Karavaev; Koeleria javorkae Ujhelyi; Koeleria britannica (Domin) Ujhelyi; Koeleria chakassica Reverd.; Koeleria transiliensis Reverd. ex Gamajun.; Koeleria csatoi Ujhelyi; Koeleria jankae Ujhelyi; Koeleria tenuipes (Domin) Ujhelyi; Koeleria kurdica Ujhelyi; Koeleria nyaradyi Ujhelyi, Koeleria mannagettae (Domin) Ujhelyi; Koeleria bitczenachica (Tzvelev) Tzvelev; Koeleria californica (Domin) Beetle; Koeleria calarashica M.G.Kalen.; Koeleria taurica M.G.Kalen., Koeleria amurensis (Domin) Tzvelev; Koeleria gordjaginii (Domin) Tzvelev; Koeleria kulikovii Tzvelev; Koeleria pilifera (Domin) Tzvelev; Koeleria sibirensis (Domin) Tzvelev; Koeleria spryginii Tzvelev; Koeleria theodoriana (Klokov) Tzvelev; Koeleria timuchinii Tzvelev; Koeleria transvolgensis Tzvelev

= Koeleria macrantha =

Species of flowering plant

Koeleria macrantha is a species of grass known by the common name prairie Junegrass in North America and crested hair-grass in the UK. It is widespread across much of Eurasia and North America. It occurs in many habitat types.

== Description ==
Koeleria macrantha is a short, tuft-forming perennial bunchgrass, reaching heights from 20–70 centimetres (8–27 1/2 inches). The leaves are basal and up to about 20 cm (8 in) long with a blue-green color. The inflorescence is nearly cylindrical and may taper somewhat toward the tip. It holds shiny tan spikelets which are sometimes tinted with purple, each about half a centimetre long. Its fruit is a grain that breaks once it has fully ripened.

== Distribution and habitat ==
Koeleria macrantha is widespread across much of Eurasia and North America.

It is a plant that prefers cooler seasons such as early spring or fall. It grows mostly in rocky or sandy, well-drained areas within forests or plains. It prefers more direct sunlight over partially shaded areas. It has the ability to grow at elevations of 121–2,480 metres (397–8,136 feet) above sea level. It often surfaces in prairie habitats. Koeleria macrantha is considered locally endangered in the state of Ohio.

== Ecology ==
Koeleria macrantha is a good forage for many types of grazing animals. It is one of many dietary staples for all classes of livestock and several species of various prairie wildlife depending on the stage of its seasonal development. It provides a stable source of nourishment for livestock in early spring and has been utilized by several species of deer, elk, and sheep as a food source due to its ability to grow in remote areas where the environment is not suited for other plant life. Due to the fact that it grows in scattered areas, it has not become a large dietary staple for much wildlife but still provides moderate nourishment to prairie wildlife. It has been found to be palatable to all livestock and wildlife in its post-curing stage in spring and fall but the palatability drops for most species when seed production begins before curing.

Koeleria marcrantha spreads slowly via seed distribution. It will spread into bordering plant communities over time as an invasive species. A number of insects feed on K. macrantha, including the striped flea beetle (Phyllotreta striolata) which feeds on the roots and foliage.

== Toxicity ==
It is classified as a severe allergen in humans with grass allergy.

== Uses ==
The seed can be ground into a powder, which can then be boiled in water like a porridge or made into flour or bread.

The leaves of the plant can be woven together to make brooms or brushes. Long stalks of the plant can be strung together with other plant fiber or string to be used for cleaning pots and pans. It has also been used as a building material when mixed with adobe for its adhesive qualities and strength.

=== Gardens ===
Koeleria macrantha is used as an exceptionally low-maintenance lawn and turf grass. It is not suitable for high-traffic use due to its slow growth rate. It is often used for golf course roughs.

=== Wildfire protection ===
Koeleria macrantha has been implemented in several areas of frequent wildfires due to its fire-resistant qualities. Due to its small size and the coarse leaves, they burn faster and transfer a very small amount of heat to the soil below. It also usually grows in small groups, which limits the amount of damage it can do once it burns. Although this species varies in its impact on fighting wildfires depending on the environment it grows in and the state of the plant, it provides a much needed damper for controlling the fire once it has begun.
