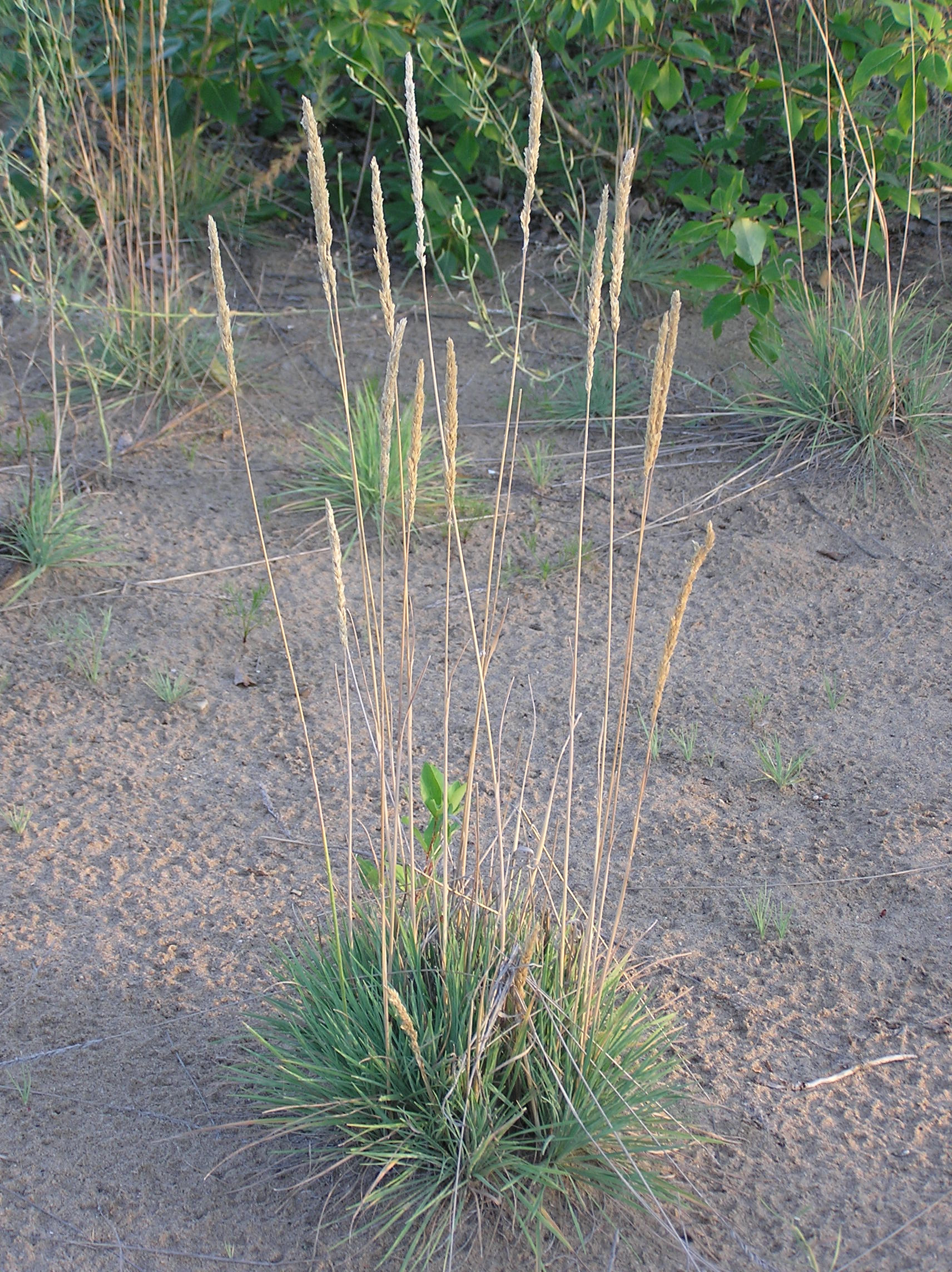
- Koeleria glauca in natural habitat (Saratov oblast, Russia)

Scientific classification
- Kingdom: Plantae
- Clade: Tracheophytes
- Clade: Angiosperms
- Clade: Monocots
- Clade: Commelinids
- Order: Poales
- Family: Poaceae
- Subfamily: Pooideae
- Genus: Koeleria
- Species: K. glauca

Binomial name
- Koeleria glauca (Schrad.) DC.

= Koeleria glauca =

Species of grass

Koeleria glauca, commonly known as blue hair grass, is a grass species of the genus Koeleria. It grows in dunes and other sandy places. It is mainly distributed in eastern Central Europe, with its western outposts in the coastal dunes of Jutland and inland dunes in the Rhine Valley.

== Description ==
The plant's foliage is bluish-grey and grows to a height of 15–30 centimetres (5.9–11.8 in). Its flowers bloom from May to July and can reach a height of 35–55 centimetres (14–22 in).
