= Vērēmi Parish =

Parish of Latvia

- parish of Latvia
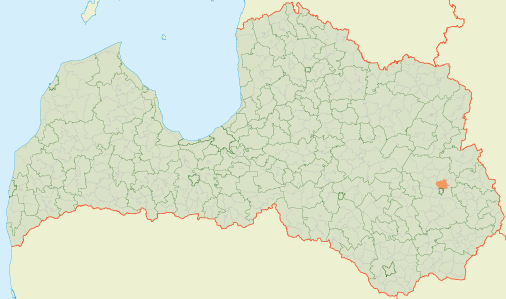
- Coordinates: 56°33′49″N 27°21′49″E
- Country: Latvia

Population (1 January 2026)
  - Total: 1,337
- Time zone: Eastern European Time
- Website: http://www.veremi.lv/

Vērēmi Parish (Latvian: Verēmu pagasts) is an administrative unit of Rēzekne Municipality, Latvia.

== Towns, villages and settlements of Verēmi parish ==
- Sondori - parish administrative center

== See also ==
- Adamova Manor
