= Fibrous root system =

Type of branching plant root system

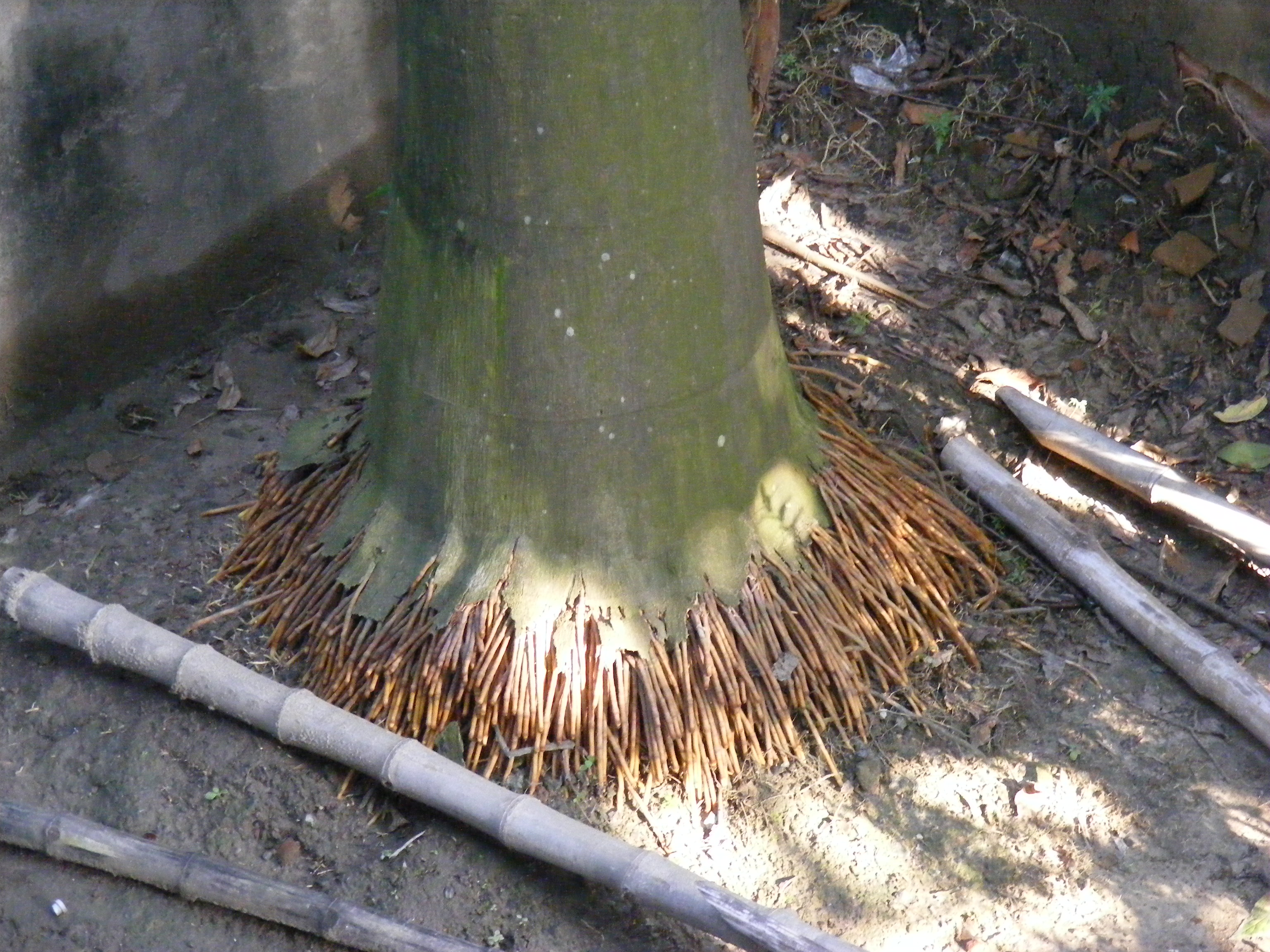
Fibrous roots of mature Roystonea regia palm, Kolkata, India

A fibrous root system is extremely similar to that of a taproot system. It is usually formed by thin, moderately branching roots growing from the stem. A fibrous root system is universal in monocotyledonous plants and ferns. The fibrous root systems look like a mat made out of roots when the plant has reached full maturity.

== Description ==
Most trees begin life with a taproot, but after one to a few months, change to a wide-spreading fibrous root system with mainly horizontal surface roots and only a few vertical, deep anchoring roots. A typical mature tree 30–50 m tall has a root system that extends horizontally in all directions as far as the tree is tall or more, but well over 95% of the roots are in the top 50 cm depth of soil.

A few plants with fibrous root systems:

- Coconut palm
- Grass
- Rosemary

Fibrous roots grow extremely far below the surface of the ground. Leaves with parallel venation have fibrous roots.

Forages have a fibrous root system, which helps combat erosion by anchoring the plants to the top layer of the soil, and covering the entirety of the field, as it is a non-row crop. In a fibrous root system, the roots grow downwards into the soil, and also branch off sideways throughout the soil. This forms a mass of fine roots, with no distinct tap root, because the embryonic root dies back while the plant is still young and growing.
