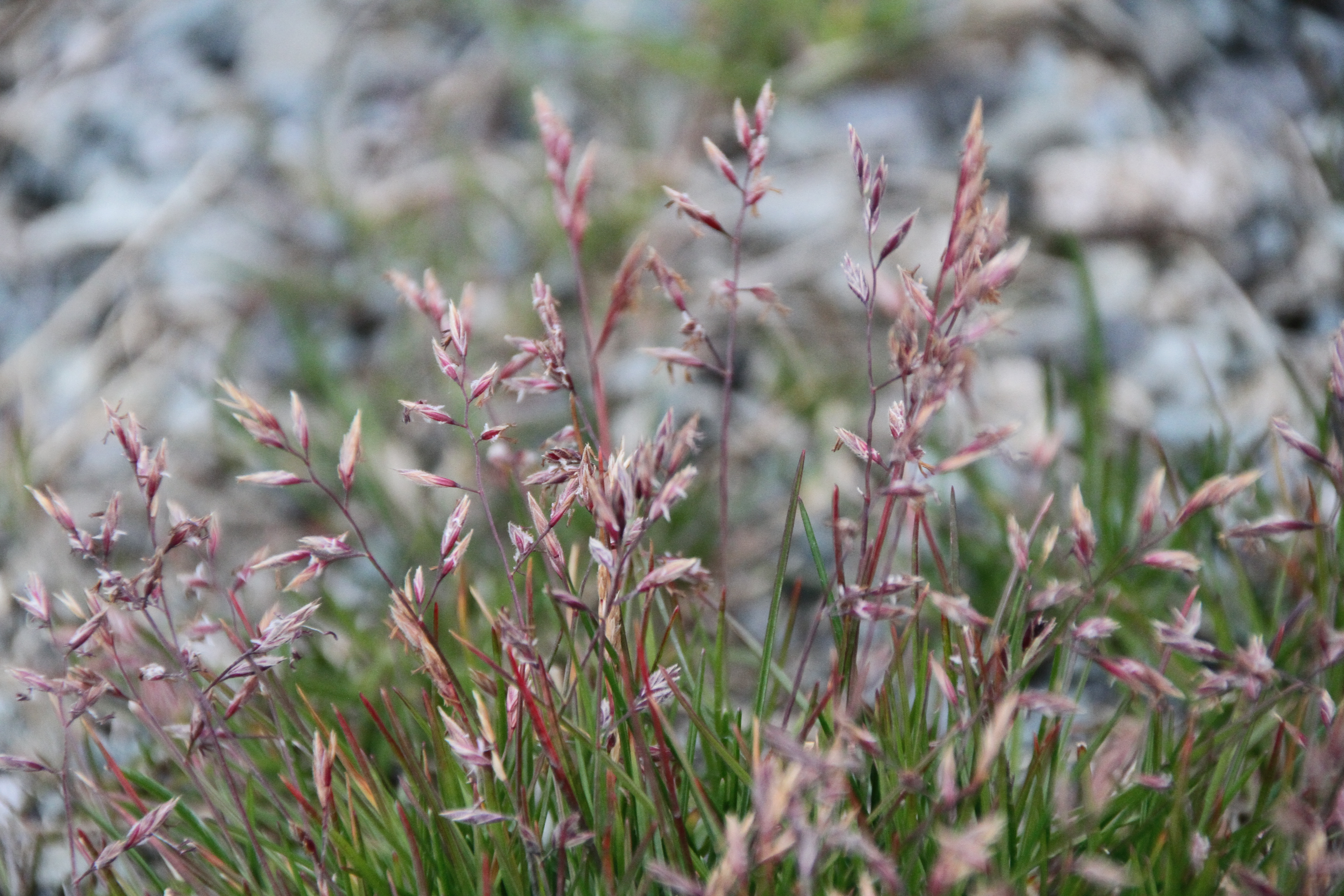

Scientific classification
- Kingdom: Plantae
- Clade: Tracheophytes
- Clade: Angiosperms
- Clade: Monocots
- Clade: Commelinids
- Order: Poales
- Family: Poaceae
- Subfamily: Pooideae
- Genus: Dupontia
- Species: D. fisheri

Binomial name
- Dupontia fisheri R.Br.

Synonyms
- List: Arctagrostis humilis K.Richt.; Arundo hyperborea Trin. ex Steud.; Cinna fisheri (R.Br.) D.L.Fu; Colpodium humile Lange; Colpodium langei Gand.; Donax kotzebuensis Trin.; Dupontia fisheri f. aristata (Mate ex Polunin) Lepage; Dupontia fisheri var. aristata Mate ex Polunin; Dupontia fisheri var. flavescens Hook. & Arn.; Dupontia fisheri f. micrantha (Holm) Polunin; Dupontia fisheri subsp. pelligera (Rupr.) Tzvelev; Dupontia fisheri var. pelligera (Rupr.) Trautv.; Dupontia fisheri f. psilosantha (Rupr.) Polunin; Dupontia fisheri subsp. psilosantha (Rupr.) Hultén; Dupontia fisheri var. psilosantha (Rupr.) Trautv.; Dupontia micrantha Holm; Dupontia pelligera (Rupr.) Rupr. ex Nyman; Dupontia psilosantha (Rupr.) Griseb.; Dupontia psilosantha var. flavescens (Hook. & Arn.) Vasey; Graphephorum fisheri (R.Br.) A.Gray; Graphephorum fisheri var. psilosanthum (Rupr.) A.Gray; Graphephorum psilosanthum (Rupr.) E.Fourn.; Melica fisheri (R.Br.) Spreng.; Poa pelligera Rupr.; Poa psilosantha Rupr.

= Dupontia fisheri =

Species of grass

Dupontia fisheri, common name tundragrass, is a species of grass. It is native to subarctic and subalpine areas of northern Canada (Labrador, Quebec, Ontario, Manitoba, Yukon Territory, Northwest Territories, and Nunavut), plus Alaska, Greenland, Svalbard, and Asian and European Russia.
