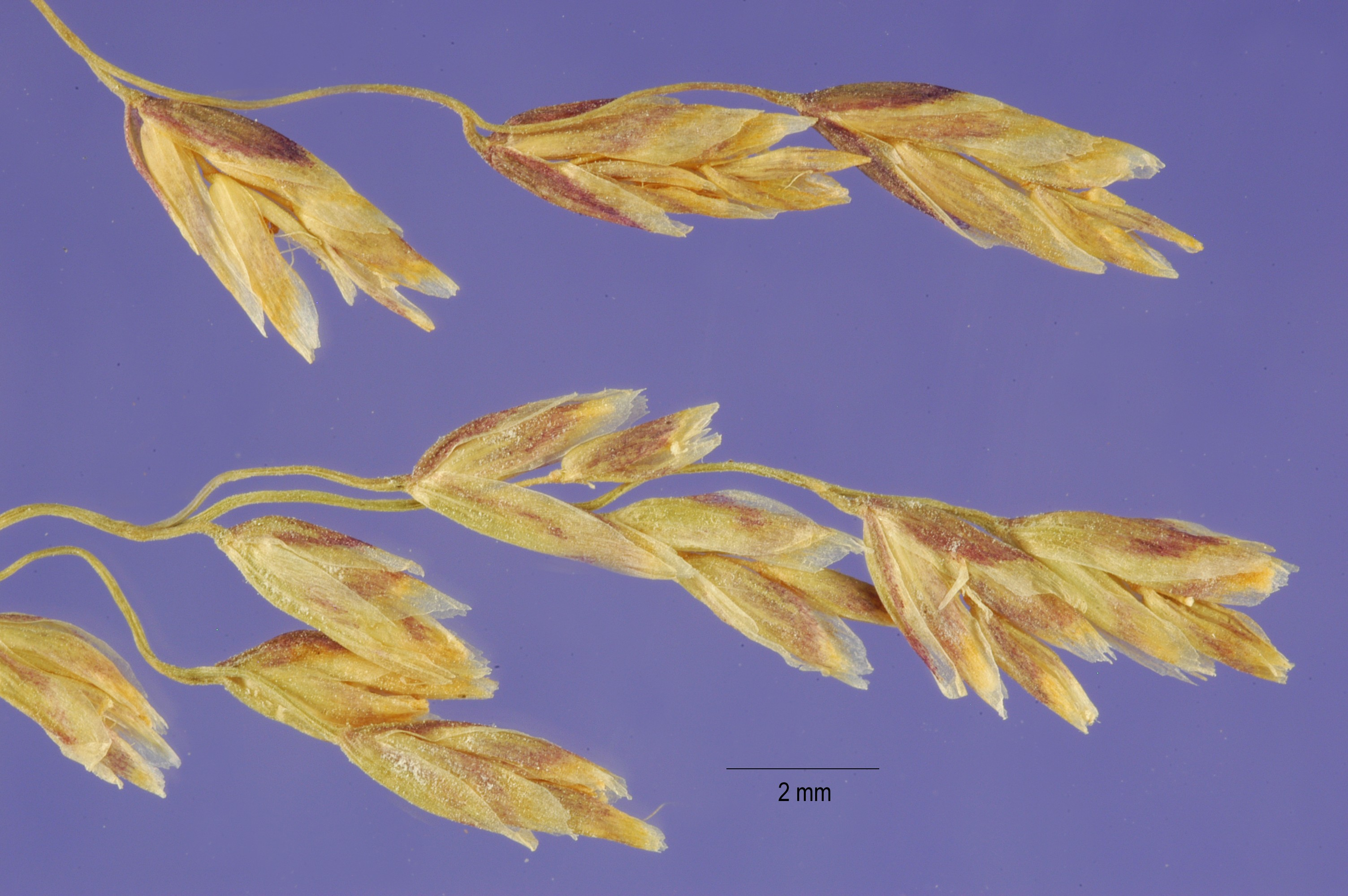

Conservation status
- Least Concern (IUCN 3.1)

Scientific classification
- Kingdom: Plantae
- Clade: Tracheophytes
- Clade: Angiosperms
- Clade: Monocots
- Clade: Commelinids
- Order: Poales
- Family: Poaceae
- Subfamily: Pooideae
- Supertribe: Poodae
- Tribe: Poeae
- Genus: Dupontia
- Species: D. fulva

Binomial name
- Dupontia fulva (Trin.) Röser & Tkach

Synonyms
- Synonymy: Arctophila brizoides Greene; Arctophila chrysantha Greene; Arctophila effusa Lange; Arctophila effusa f. depauperata Nath.; Arctophila fulva (Trin.) Andersson; Arctophila fulva f. aristata (Polunin) Scoggan; Arctophila fulva var. pendulina (Laest. ex Wahlenb.) Holmb.; Arctophila fulva subsp. pendulina (Laest. ex Wahlenb.) Andersson; Arctophila fulva subsp. similis (Rupr.) Tzvelev; Arctophila fulva var. similis (Rupr.) Tzvelev; Arctophila gracilis Greene; Arctophila laestadii Rupr.; Arctophila latiflora Rupr.; Arctophila mucronata Hack. ex Vasey; Arctophila poecilantha Rupr.; Arctophila remotiflora Rupr.; Arctophila similis Rupr.; Arctophila trichoclada Rupr.; Arctophila trichopoda Holm; Cinna fulva (Trin.) D.L.Fu; Colpodium fulvum (Trin.) Griseb.; Colpodium fulvum var. aristatum Polunin; Colpodium fulvum f. depauperatum (Nath.) Polunin; Colpodium fulvum var. effusum (Lange) Polunin; Colpodium malmgrenii Andersson; Colpodium mucronatum Beal; Colpodium pendulinum (Laest. ex Wahlenb.) Griseb.; Colpodium pendulinum var. simile (Rupr.) Griseb.; Glyceria fulva (Trin.) Fr.; Glyceria pendulina Laest. ex Wahlenb.; Graphephorum fulvum (Trin.) A.Gray; Graphephorum pendulinum (Laest. ex Wahlenb.) A.Gray; Molinia pendulina (Laest. ex Wahlenb.) Hartm.; Poa deflexa Rupr.; Poa fulva Trin. (1830) (basionym); Poa laestadii Rupr.; Poa latiflora Rupr.; Poa pendulina (Laest. ex Wahlenb.) J.Vahl; Poa poecilantha Rupr.; Poa remotiflora Rupr.; Poa similis Rupr.; Poa trichoclada Rupr.

= Dupontia fulva =

Species of grass

Dupontia fulva, commonly known as pendant grass, is a species of grass native to arctic and subarctic regions of Eurasia and North America (northern Russia, Finland, Sweden, Svalbard, Greenland, Alaska, and Canada), where it grows in tundra wetlands.

== See also ==
- List of Poaceae genera
