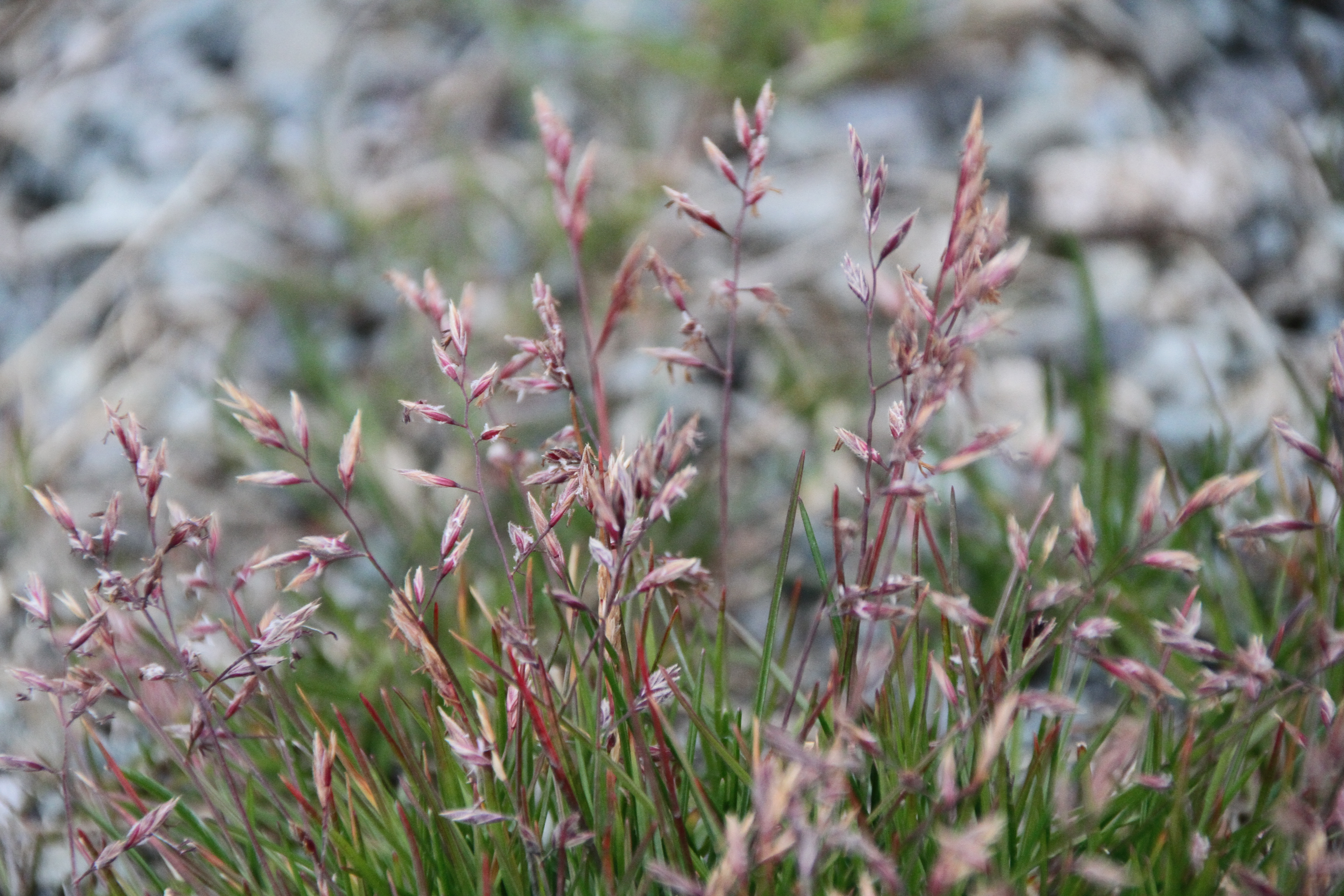
- Dupontia fisheri

Scientific classification
- Kingdom: Plantae
- Clade: Tracheophytes
- Clade: Angiosperms
- Clade: Monocots
- Clade: Commelinids
- Order: Poales
- Family: Poaceae
- Subfamily: Pooideae
- Tribe: Poeae
- Genus: Dupontia; R.Br.

Species
- Dupontia fisheri R.Br.; Dupontia fulva (Trin.) Röser & Tkach

Synonyms
- Arctophila (Rupr.) Andersson

= Dupontia (plant) =

Genus of grasses

Dupontia is a genus of grasses. It includes two species native to subarctic North America and Eurasia.

- Dupontia fisheri R.Br.
- Dupontia fulva (Trin.) Röser & Tkach
