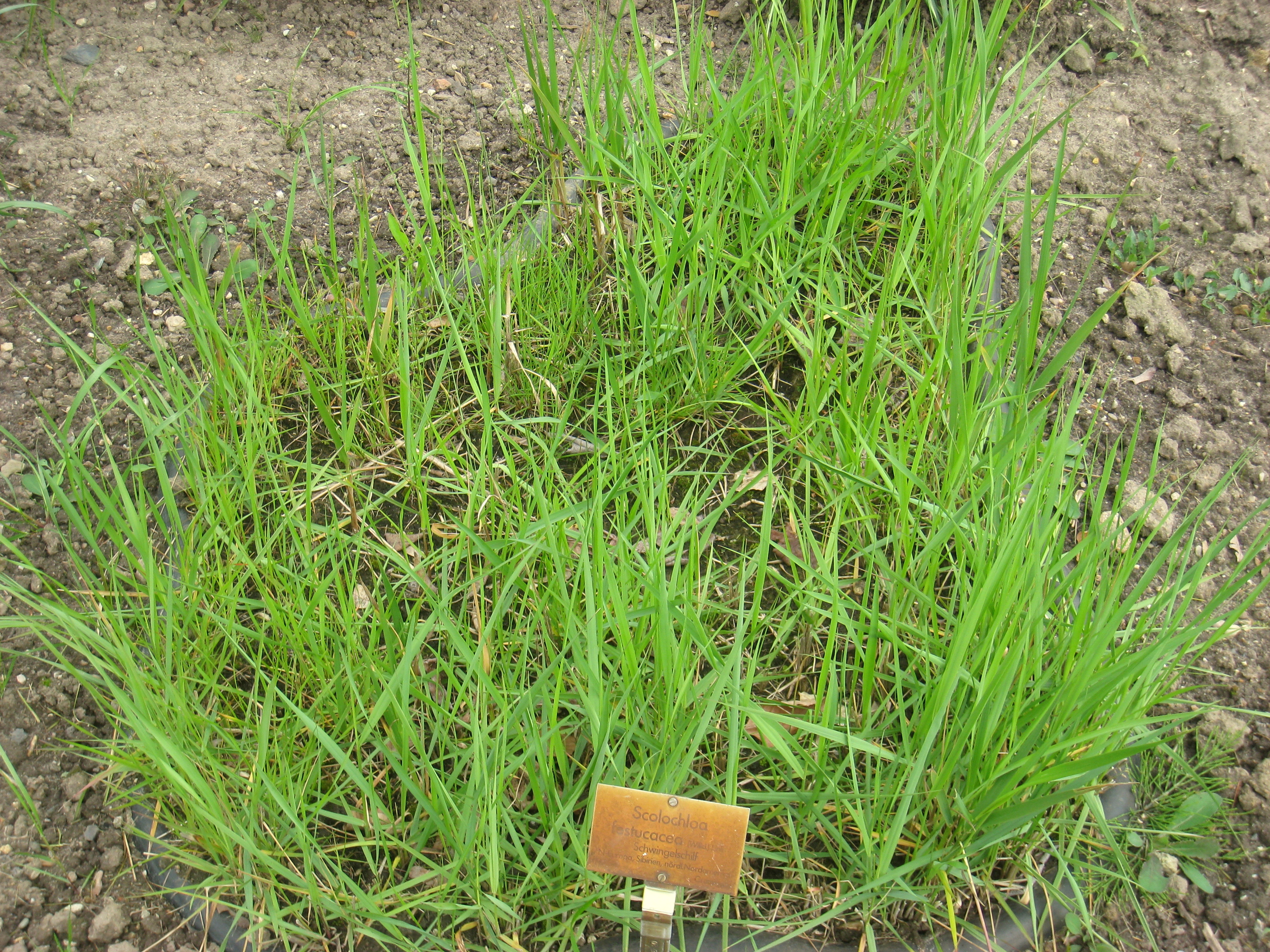

Scientific classification
- Kingdom: Plantae
- Clade: Tracheophytes
- Clade: Angiosperms
- Clade: Monocots
- Clade: Commelinids
- Order: Poales
- Family: Poaceae
- Subfamily: Pooideae
- Supertribe: Poodae
- Tribe: Poeae
- Subtribe: Scolochloinae
- Genus: Scolochloa; Link
- Species: S. festucacea

Binomial name
- Scolochloa festucacea (Willd.) Link

Synonyms
- Graphephorum sect. Scolochloa (Link) Benth. & Hook. f.; Arundo festucacea Willd.; Donax festucaceus (Willd.) P.Beauv.; Triodia festucacea (Willd.) Roth; Graphephorum festucaceum (Willd.) A.Gray; Sieglingia festucacea (Willd.) Jess.; Fluminia festucacea (Willd.) Hitchc.; Schedonorus arundinaceus Roem. & Schult.; Donax borealis Trin.; Festuca borealis (Trin.) Mert. & W.D.J.Koch; Festuca donacina Wahlenb.; Fluminia arundinacea (Roem. & Schult.) Fr.; Graphephorum arundinaceum (Roem. & Schult.) Asch.; Scolochloa marchica M.Duvel, Ristow, H.Scholz

= Scolochloa =

Genus of grasses

Scolochloa is a genus of grasses in the family Poaceae / Gramineae, now containing a single species, Scolochloa festucacea. Common rivergrass is a common name for the species. Scolochloa festucacea grows in Europe, temperate Asia, and North America. Its culms are erect and 100–150 centimetres (39–59 in) in height; its leaf blades are 15–30 cm (5.9–11.8 in) long and 5–10 mm (0.20–0.39 in) wide.

The genus formerly included a second species, Scolochloa arundinacea, which is now placed in the genus Arundo as Arundo donax.
