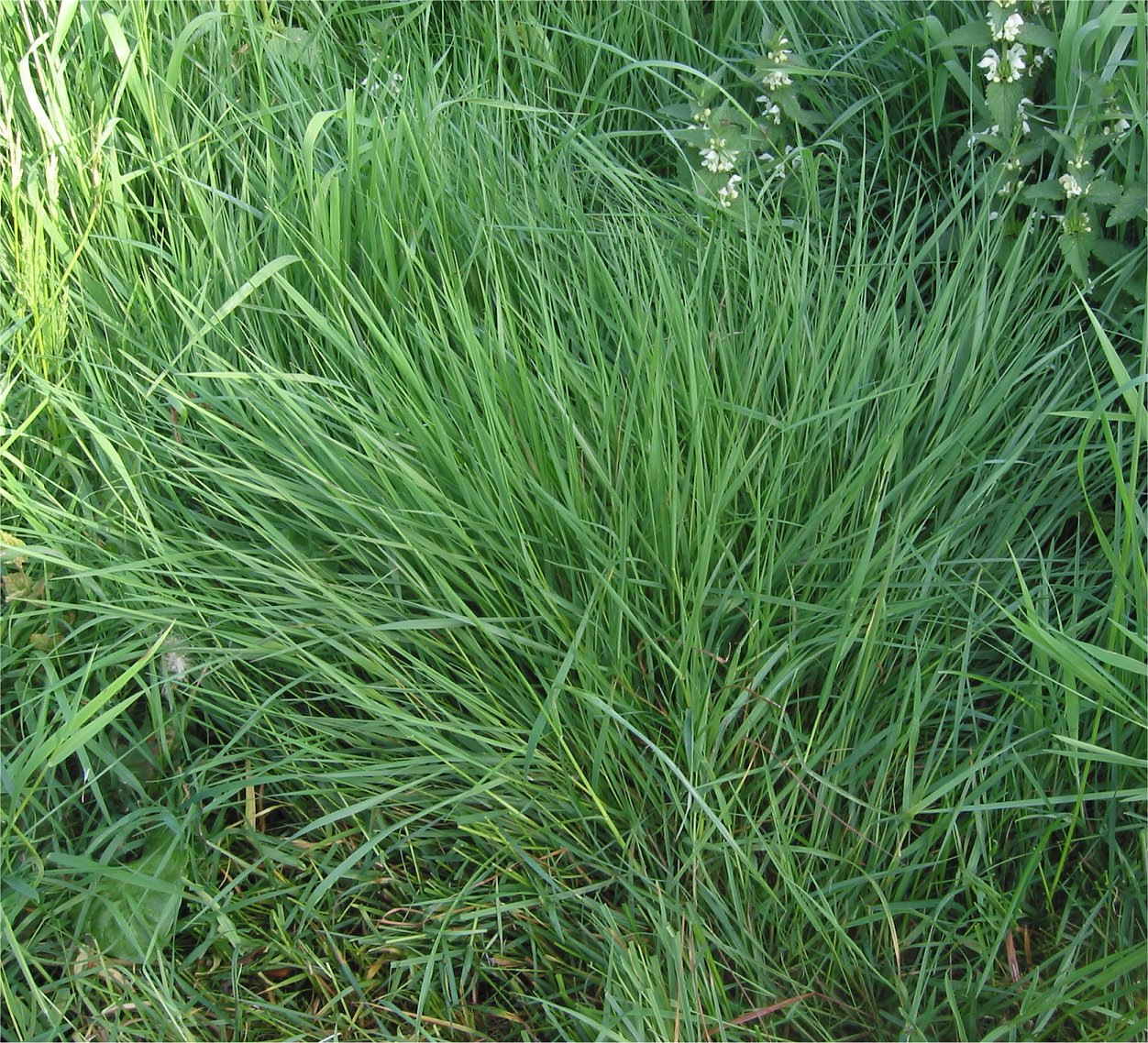
- Agrostis capillaris

Scientific classification
- Kingdom: Plantae
- Clade: Tracheophytes
- Clade: Angiosperms
- Clade: Monocots
- Clade: Commelinids
- Order: Poales
- Family: Poaceae
- Subfamily: Pooideae
- Supertribe: Poodae
- Tribe: Poeae
- Subtribe: Agrostidinae
- Genus: Agrostis; L.

Type species
- Agrostis canina L.

Synonyms
- Agraulus P.Beauv.; Agrestis Bubani; Anomalotis Steud.; Bromidium Nees & Meyen; Candollea Steud.; Chaetopogon Janch.; Chaeturus Link; Decandolia T.Bastard; Didymochaeta Steud.; Linkagrostis Romero García, Blanca & C.Morales; Neoschischkinia Tzvelev; Notonema Raf.; Pentatherum Nábelek; Senisetum Honda; Trichodium Michx.; Vilfa Adans.

= Agrostis =

Bentgrass

Genus of flowering plants in the grass family

Agrostis (bent, bentgrass) is a large and very nearly cosmopolitan genus of plants in the grass family, found in nearly all the countries in the world.

== Species ==
As of May 2024, Plants of the World Online accepted the following species:

- Agrostis ambatoensis Asteg.
- Agrostis × amurensis Prob.
- Agrostis anadyrensis Soczava
- Agrostis angrenica (Butkov) Tzvelev
- Agrostis × aquitanica Romero Zarco & Romero García
- Agrostis arvensis Phil.
- Agrostis atlantica Maire & Trab.
- Agrostis australiensis Mez
- Agrostis × avatschensis Prob.
- Agrostis balansae (Boiss.) Tzvelev
- Agrostis barikii P.Agnihotri & D.Prasad
- Agrostis basalis Luces
- Agrostis bergiana Trin.
- Agrostis bettyae S.W.L.Jacobs
- Agrostis × bjoerkmannii Widén
- Agrostis blasdalei Hitchc.
- Agrostis boormanii Vickery
- Agrostis bourgaei E.Fourn.
- Agrostis boyacensis Swallen & García-Barr.
- Agrostis brachiata Munro ex Hook.f.
- Agrostis brachyathera Steud.
- Agrostis breviculmis Hitchc.
- Agrostis burmanica Bor
- Agrostis calderoniae Acosta
- Agrostis canina L.
- Agrostis capillaris L. (common bent, browntop)
- Agrostis carmichaelii Schult. & Schult.f.
- Agrostis castellana Boiss. & Reut. (highland bent)
- Agrostis × castriferrei Waisb.
- Agrostis clavata Trin. (northern bent)
- Agrostis × clavatiformis Prob.
- Agrostis clemensiorum Bor
- Agrostis comorensis A.Camus
- Agrostis congestiflora Tutin & E.F.Warb.
- Agrostis continuata Stapf
- Agrostis cypricola H.Lindb.
- Agrostis czernjaginae Prob.
- Agrostis decaryana A.Camus
- Agrostis delislei Hemsl.
- Agrostis densiflora Vasey (California bent)
- Agrostis diemenica D.I.Morris
- Agrostis divaricatissima Mez
- Agrostis dshungarica (Tzvelev) Tzvelev
- Agrostis dyeri Petrie
- Agrostis elliotii Hack.
- Agrostis elliottiana Schult.
- Agrostis emirnensis (Baker) Bosser
- Agrostis exarata Trin. (spike bent)
- Agrostis filipes Hook.f.
- Agrostis flaccida Hack.
- Agrostis foliata Hook.f.
- Agrostis × fouilladei P.Fourn.
- Agrostis gariana Taheri
- Agrostis ghiesbreghtii E.Fourn.
- Agrostis gigantea Roth (black bent, redtop)
- Agrostis × gigantifera Portal
- Agrostis glabra (J.Presl) Kunth
- Agrostis goughensis C.E.Hubb.
- Agrostis gracilifolia C.E.Hubb.
- Agrostis gracililaxa Franco
- Agrostis griffithiana (Hook.f.) Bor
- Agrostis hallii Vasey
- Agrostis × hegetschweileri Brügger
- Agrostis hendersonii Hitchc.
- Agrostis hesperica Romero García, Blanca, G.López & C.Morales
- Agrostis hideoi Ohwi
- Agrostis hirta Veldkamp
- Agrostis holgateana C.E.Hubb.
- Agrostis hookeriana C.B.Clarke ex Hook.f.
- Agrostis hooveri Swallen
- Agrostis howellii Scribn. ex Vasey
- Agrostis hugoniana Rendle
- Agrostis humbertii A.Camus
- Agrostis hyemalis (Walter) Britton, Sterns & Poggenb. (winter bent)
- Agrostis hygrometrica Nees
- Agrostis idahoensis Nash
- Agrostis imbecilla Zotov
- Agrostis imberbis Phil.
- Agrostis inaequiglumis Griseb.
- Agrostis inconspicua Kunze
- Agrostis infirma Buse
- Agrostis innominata Enustsch.
- Agrostis insularis Rúgolo & A.M.Molina
- Agrostis isopholis C.E.Hubb.
- Agrostis jahnii Luces
- Agrostis joyceae S.W.L.Jacobs
- Agrostis juressi Link
- Agrostis keniensis Pilg.
- Agrostis kilimandscharica Mez
- Agrostis koelerioides É.Desv.
- Agrostis kolymensis Kuvaev & A.P.Khokhr.
- Agrostis korczaginii Senjan.-Korcz.
- Agrostis kurczenkoae Prob.
- Agrostis lacuna-vernalis P.M.Peterson & Soreng
- Agrostis laegaardii A.M.Molina & Rúgolo
- Agrostis × lapenkoi Prob.
- Agrostis laxissima Swallen
- Agrostis lazica Balansa
- Agrostis lehmannii Swallen
- Agrostis lenis Roseng.
- Agrostis leptotricha É.Desv.
- Agrostis longiberbis Hack. ex Lor.B.Sm.
- Agrostis mackliniae Bor
- Agrostis mannii (Hook.f.) Stapf
- Agrostis marojejyensis A.Camus
- Agrostis masafuerana Pilg.
- Agrostis media Carmich.
- Agrostis mertensii Trin. (Arctic bent)
- Agrostis merxmuelleri Greuter & H.Scholz
- Agrostis meyenii Trin.
- Agrostis micrantha Steud.
- Agrostis microphylla Steud.
- Agrostis montevidensis Spreng. ex Nees
- Agrostis muelleriana Vickery
- Agrostis munroana Aitch. & Hemsl.
- Agrostis × murbeckii Fouill.
- Agrostis muscosa Kirk
- Agrostis musjidii Rajesw., R.R.Rao & Arti Garg
- Agrostis nebulosa Boiss. & Reut.
- Agrostis nervosa Nees ex Trin.
- Agrostis neshatajevae Prob.
- Agrostis nevadensis Boiss.
- Agrostis nevskii Tzvelev
- Agrostis × novograblenovii Prob.
- Agrostis olympica (Boiss.) Bor
- Agrostis oregonensis Vasey
- Agrostis oresbia Edgar
- Agrostis osakae Honda
- Agrostis pallens Trin. (dune bent, seashore bent)
- Agrostis pallescens Cheeseman
- Agrostis × paramushirensis Prob.
- Agrostis parviflora R.Br.
- Agrostis paulsenii Hack.
- Agrostis pendryi Paszko
- Agrostis peninsularis Hook.f.
- Agrostis perennans (Walter) Tuck. (upland bent)
- Agrostis personata Edgar
- Agrostis peschkovae Enustsch.
- Agrostis petriei Hack.
- Agrostis philippiana Rúgolo & De Paula
- Agrostis phillipsiae R.Kr.Singh, Arigela & Ch.S.Reddy
- Agrostis pilgeriana C.E.Hubb.
- Agrostis pilosula Trin.
- Agrostis pittieri Hack.
- Agrostis platensis Parodi
- Agrostis pleiophylla Mez
- Agrostis pourretii Willd.
- Agrostis producta Pilg.
- Agrostis propinqua S.W.L.Jacobs
- Agrostis quinqueseta (Steud.) Hochst.
- Agrostis reuteri Boiss.
- Agrostis rossiae Vasey
- Agrostis rupestris All.
- Agrostis salaziensis C.Cordem.
- Agrostis salsa Korsh.
- Agrostis sandwicensis Hillebr.
- Agrostis × sanionis Asch. & Graebn.
- Agrostis scabra Willd. (rough bent, tickle bent)
- Agrostis scabrifolia Swallen
- Agrostis schischkinii Paszko
- Agrostis schmidii (Hook.f.) C.E.C.Fisch.
- Agrostis schraderiana Bech.
- Agrostis sclerophylla C.E.Hubb.
- Agrostis serranoi Phil.
- Agrostis sichotensis Prob.
- Agrostis sikkimensis Bor
- Agrostis sinocontracta S.M.Phillips & S.L.Lu
- Agrostis sinorupestris L.Liu ex S.M.Phillips & S.L.Lu
- Agrostis × stebleri (Asch. & Graebn.) Portal
- Agrostis stolonifera L. (creeping bent)
- Agrostis × subclavata Prob.
- Agrostis subpatens Hitchc.
- Agrostis subrepens (Hitchc.) Hitchc.
- Agrostis subspicata (Willd.) Raspail
- Agrostis subulata Hook.f.
- Agrostis subulifolia Stapf
- Agrostis swalalahos Otting
- Agrostis tandilensis (Kuntze) Parodi (Kennedy's bent)
- Agrostis tateyamensis Tateoka
- Agrostis taylorii C.E.Hubb.
- Agrostis tenerrima Trin.
- Agrostis thompsoniae S.W.L.Jacobs
- Agrostis tibestica Miré & Quézel
- Agrostis tileni G.Nieto Fel. & Castrov.
- Agrostis tolucensis Kunth
- Agrostis × torgesii Portal
- Agrostis trachychlaena C.E.Hubb.
- Agrostis trachyphylla Pilg.
- Agrostis trisetoides Steud.
- Agrostis truncata Charit.
- Agrostis tsaratananensis A.Camus
- Agrostis tsiafajavonensis A.Camus
- Agrostis tsitondroinensis A.Camus
- Agrostis turrialbae Mez
- Agrostis tuvinica Peschkova
- Agrostis uliginosa Phil.
- Agrostis umbellata Colla
- Agrostis ushae Noltie
- Agrostis × ussuriensis Prob.
- Agrostis valvata Steud.
- Agrostis variabilis Rydb. (mountain bent)
- Agrostis venezuelana Mez
- Agrostis venusta Trin.
- Agrostis vidalii Phil.
- Agrostis vinealis Schreb. (brown bent)
- Agrostis volkensii Stapf
- Agrostis wacei C.E.Hubb.
- Agrostis zenkeri Trin.

=== Formerly placed here ===
Hundreds of species formerly listed in the genus Agrostis have been moved to other genera, including Achnatherum, Agrostula, Aira, Alloteropsis, Alpagrostis, Apera, Arundinella, Calamagrostis, Chionochloa, Chloris, Cinna, Colpodium, Crypsis, Cynodon, Deschampsia, Dichelachne, Digitaria, Eremochloa, Eriochloa, Eustachys, Gastridium, Graphephorum, Gymnopogon, Lachnagrostis, Leptochloa, Muhlenbergia, Pentameris, Phippsia, Piptatherum, Poa, Polypogon, Puccinellia, Reimarochloa, Relchela, Schismus, Sporobolus and Zingeria.

Former species include:

- Agrostis curtisii (bristle bent) → Alpagrostis setacea
- Agrostis humilis → Podagrostis humilis
- Agrostis magellanica → Polypogon magellanicus
- Agrostis thurberiana → Podagrostis thurberiana
- Agrostis truncatula → Agrostula truncatula

== Uses ==
Some species of bents are commonly used for lawn grass. This is a desirable grass for golf course teeing areas, fairways, and greens.

Bentgrass is used in turf applications for its numerous advantages: it can be mowed to a very short length without damage, it can handle a great amount of foot traffic, it has a shallow root system that is thick and dense allowing it to be seeded and grow rather easily, and it has a pleasing, deep green appearance. The name "bent" refers to the shallow roots, which bend just below the surface of the soil to propagate laterally.

=== Creeping bent ===
Agrostis stolonifera is the most commonly used species of Agrostis. Historically, it was often called Orcheston long grass, after a village on Salisbury Plain, England. It is cultivated almost exclusively on golf courses, especially on putting greens. Creeping bent aggressively produces horizontal stems, called stolons, that run along the soil's surface. These allow creeping bent to form dense stands especially when mown at low mowing heights and outcompete bunch-type grass and broadleaf weeds. As such, if infested in a home lawn and mown at higher mowing heights, it can become a troublesome weed problem. The leaves of the bentgrass are long and slender. It can quickly take over a home lawn if it is not controlled and has very shallow roots.

The Scotts Miracle-Gro Company and Monsanto genetically engineered creeping bent to be glyphosate-tolerant under Monsanto's Roundup Ready trademark, as "one of the first wind-pollinated, perennial, and highly outcrossing transgenic crops". In 2003, Scotts planted it as part of a large (about 160 ha) field trial in central Oregon near Madras. In 2004, its pollen was found to have reached wild growing bentgrass populations up to 14 kilometres away. Cross-pollinating Agrostis gigantea was even found at a distance of 21 kilometres. Scotts could not remove all genetically engineered plants and in 2007, the Animal and Plant Health Inspection Service fined them $500,000 for non-compliance with Plant Protection Act regulations.

=== Common bent ===
Agrostis capillaris, or colonial bent, was brought to America from Europe. This was the type of grass that was used on the lawns of most estates. It is the tallest of the bents with very fine texture and like most bent grasses grows very densely. Although this species has been used on golf courses and sporting fields it is better suited for lawns. Colonial bent is fairly easy to grow from seeds and fertilization of the lawn is not as intense. This grass also takes longer to establish than creeping bent. However it does not require the intense maintenance.

=== Velvet bent ===
Agrostis canina gets its name for the velvet appearance that this grass produces. It has the finest texture of all the bent grasses. This grass was used in Europe for estate lawns and golf courses because it could be cut so short. Velvet bent grass requires similar upkeep and maintenance to creeping bent. Velvet bent has recently had a resurgence in the UK due to the high demands on greens from inclement weather and speed expectations. This species also has a lighter color than the two previous species.

== Butterfly food plant ==
Butterflies whose caterpillars feed on Agrostis include:

- Zabulon skipper, Poanes zabulon

== See also ==
- Dollar spot
- List of Poaceae genera
