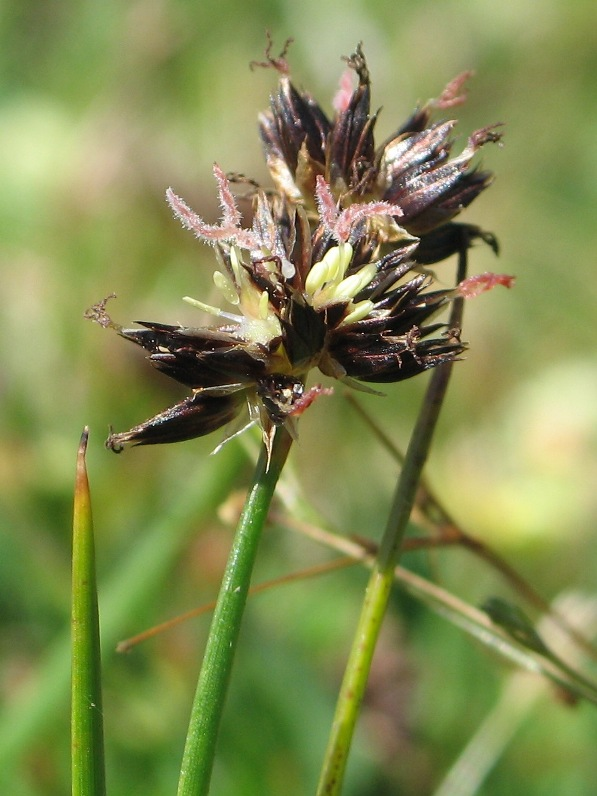
- Juncus phaeocephalus var. phaeocephalus

Scientific classification
- Kingdom: Plantae
- Clade: Tracheophytes
- Clade: Angiosperms
- Clade: Monocots
- Clade: Commelinids
- Order: Poales
- Family: Juncaceae
- Genus: Juncus
- Species: J. phaeocephalus

Binomial name
- Juncus phaeocephalus Engelm.

= Juncus phaeocephalus =

Species of plant

Juncus phaeocephalus, the brown-headed rush, is native mostly along the coast of California, north to Oregon and Washington. It grows in moist seeps and shallow wet soil.

== Distribution ==
Juncus phaeocephalus is native to the coastlines of California. It is distributed in meadows and borders of swamps and coastal regions from Los Angeles County and Mendocino County to Oregon and Washington.

Habitat and ecology

Juncus phaeocephalus grows along the coast in sand dunes, marshes and sloughs. Some of them also grow inland in wet grassy meadows, bogs, and along lakes and streams, such as in the Peninsular Ranges and Transverse Ranges of Southern California. Its creeping rhizomes can spread across moist soil. This perennial plant can grow in elevations less than 2,200 metres (7,200 ft) high.

== Description ==
Juncus phaeocephalus is a grasslike perennial with stout, creeping rhizomes. It has flattened stems that are two-edged and can grow up to 1.5 feet (0.46 m) tall. Its leaves are shorter than its flowering stems. Flowers have a brownish color and appear in spherical clusters at the tops of the flowering stems. Brown-head Rush may be mistaken for sedges or irises because of its stems and leaves. This plant produces many seeds. These ovoid seeds are about 0.6 mm in size.

=== Varieties ===
Juncus phaeocephalus is a variable species in which several subspecific varieties have been characterized mainly on its branching patterns of the inflorescences.
Named varieties include:

- J. phaeocephalus var. phaeocephalus — plants with few, many-flowered heads.
- J. phaeocephalus var. paniculatus— plants with many, few-flowered heads.
- J. phaeocephalus var. glomeratus — plants with many, many-flowered heads.

== Poisonous plant ==
According to the tests made on the plants at the Chemistry Laboratory of the California Department of Food and Agriculture, Juncus phaeocephalus has as much as 30 ppm of hydrocyanic acid present in the plants. Due to its volatile nature, the concentration of this chemical might have been greater before the actual testing was made.

One actual case of hydrocyanic acid poisoning from a common rush occurred in California. In December 1958, two dairy heifers were found dead on a farm land near Petaluma, Sonoma County. The heifers died due to consumption of Juncus phaeocephalus plants. Juncus phaeocephalus grows in plant communities with Verbena spp., Mimulus guttatus, Eleocharis macrostachya and Agrostis densiflora.
