= Agrostis thurberiana =

Conservation status
- Secure (NatureServe)

Scientific classification
- Kingdom: Plantae
- Clade: Tracheophytes
- Clade: Angiosperms
- Clade: Monocots
- Clade: Commelinids
- Order: Poales
- Family: Poaceae
- Subfamily: Pooideae
- Genus: Agrostis
- Species: A. thurberiana

Binomial name
- Agrostis thurberiana Hitchc.

Species of grass

Agrostis thurberiana is a species of grass that is native to northwest and southwest United States and Canada (the Aleutian Islands, Alaska, British Columbia, Colorado, Oregon, Washington and California).

== Description ==
The species is perennial with short rhizomes and 15–30 centimetres (5.9–11.8 in) long culms. It has smooth leaf-sheaths with an eciliate membrane that is 1–3 millimetres (0.039–0.118 in) long and goes around the ligule. It is also lacerate, truncate and obtuse with the leaf blades being 0.5–3 millimetres (0.020–0.118 in) wide. The panicle is open, inflorescenced, lanceolate, and is 5–10 centimetres (2.0–3.9 in) long. The species' spikelets are 2–2.3 millimetres (0.079–0.091 in) long and are both elliptic and solitary with pedicelled fertile spikelets and one fertile floret which have a hairy callus.

The glumes are 2–2.3 millimetres (0.079–0.091 in) long and are lanceolate, membranous and have one keel. They also have scaberulous veins and acute apexes. It have a hairy and 0.1–0.3 millimetres (0.0039–0.0118 in) long rhachilla and elliptic 2 millimetres (0.079 in) long and keelless fertile lemma while the lemma itself have a dentated apex. Flowers have two 0.5–0.6 millimetres (0.020–0.024 in) long lodicules which are membranous while the stamens (of which there are three of) are 0.4–0.6 millimetres (0.016–0.024 in) long. The hilum is linear while the fruits are caryopses with an additional pericarp.

== Distribution ==
It is native to the west of North America, from the Aleutian Islands to California. In California, it is found growing along with lodgepole pine and red, and subalpine firs on various wetlands.
