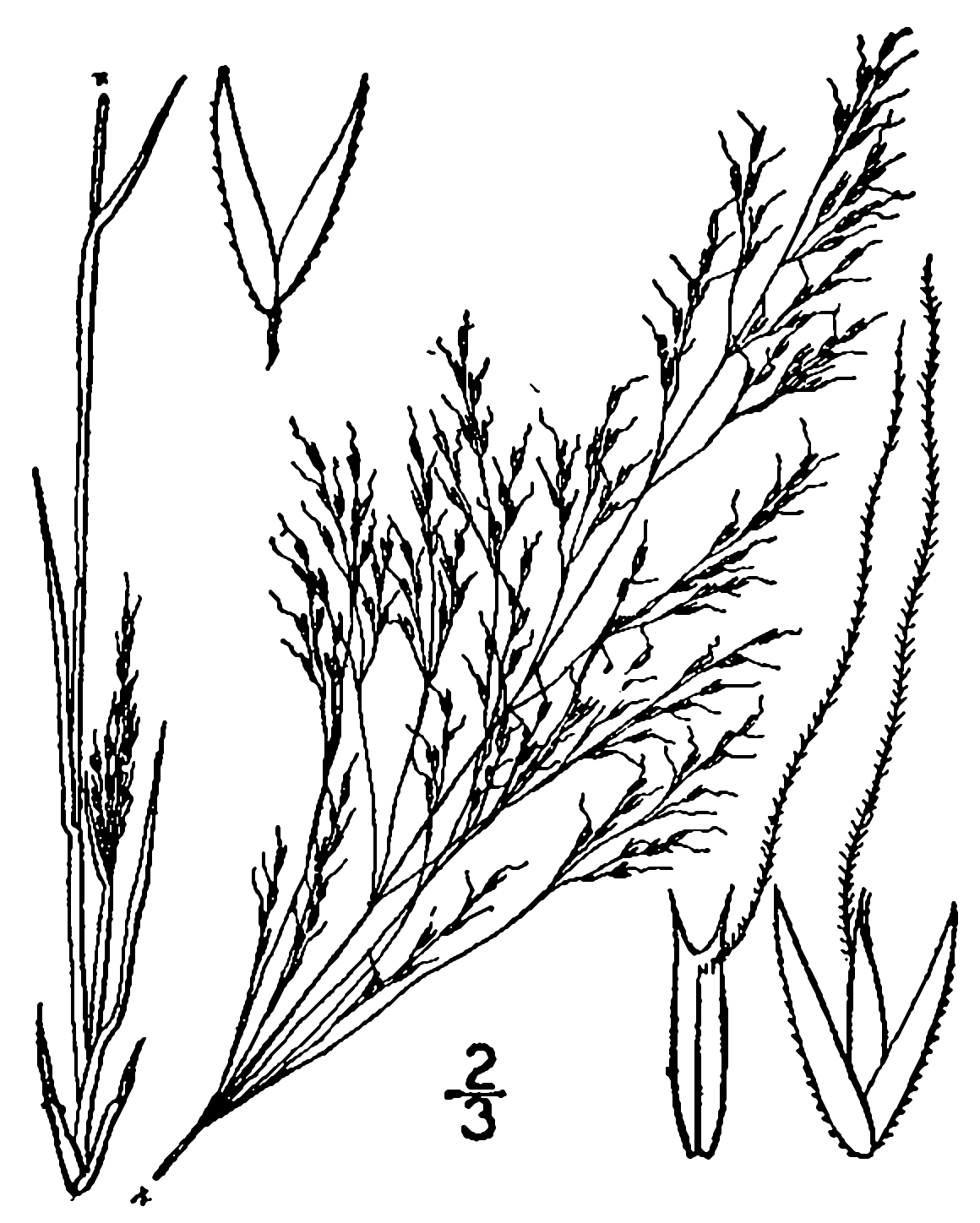

Conservation status
- Secure (NatureServe)

Scientific classification
- Kingdom: Plantae
- Clade: Tracheophytes
- Clade: Angiosperms
- Clade: Monocots
- Clade: Commelinids
- Order: Poales
- Family: Poaceae
- Subfamily: Pooideae
- Genus: Agrostis
- Species: A. elliottiana

Binomial name
- Agrostis elliottiana Schult.

Synonyms
- Agrostis exigua

= Agrostis elliottiana =

Species of flowering plant

Agrostis elliottiana is a species of grass known by the common name Elliott's bent grass.

== Distribution ==
It is a bunchgrass native to various parts of North America in disjunct locations, including north-central California, southwestern and southeastern United States, and the Yucatán Peninsula in Mexico.

== Description ==
Agrostis elliottiana grows in a variety of habitats, including disturbed areas such as roadsides. It is an annual grass growing up to about 45 centimeters tall. The leaves are short and thready. The inflorescence is an open array of wispy branches holding clusters of tiny spikelets, each just a few millimeters long but sporting a wavy awn which can reach a centimeter in length.
