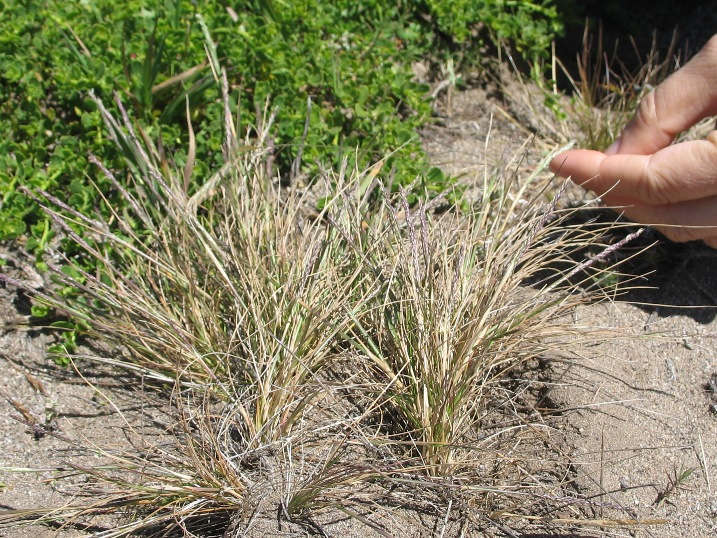

Conservation status
- Imperiled (NatureServe)

Scientific classification
- Kingdom: Plantae
- Clade: Tracheophytes
- Clade: Angiosperms
- Clade: Monocots
- Clade: Commelinids
- Order: Poales
- Family: Poaceae
- Subfamily: Pooideae
- Genus: Agrostis
- Species: A. blasdalei

Binomial name
- Agrostis blasdalei Hitchc.

= Agrostis blasdalei =

Species of flowering plant

Agrostis blasdalei is a species of grass known by the common name Blasdale's bent grass. It is endemic to the coast of northern California, where it grows in habitat along the immediate coastline, such as dunes and bluffs.

== Description ==
It is a perennial grass growing in tufts up to 30 centimeters tall. It has short, thready leaves a few centimeters long. The inflorescence is a thin cylindrical array of tiny spikelets, each up to 4 millimeters in length.
