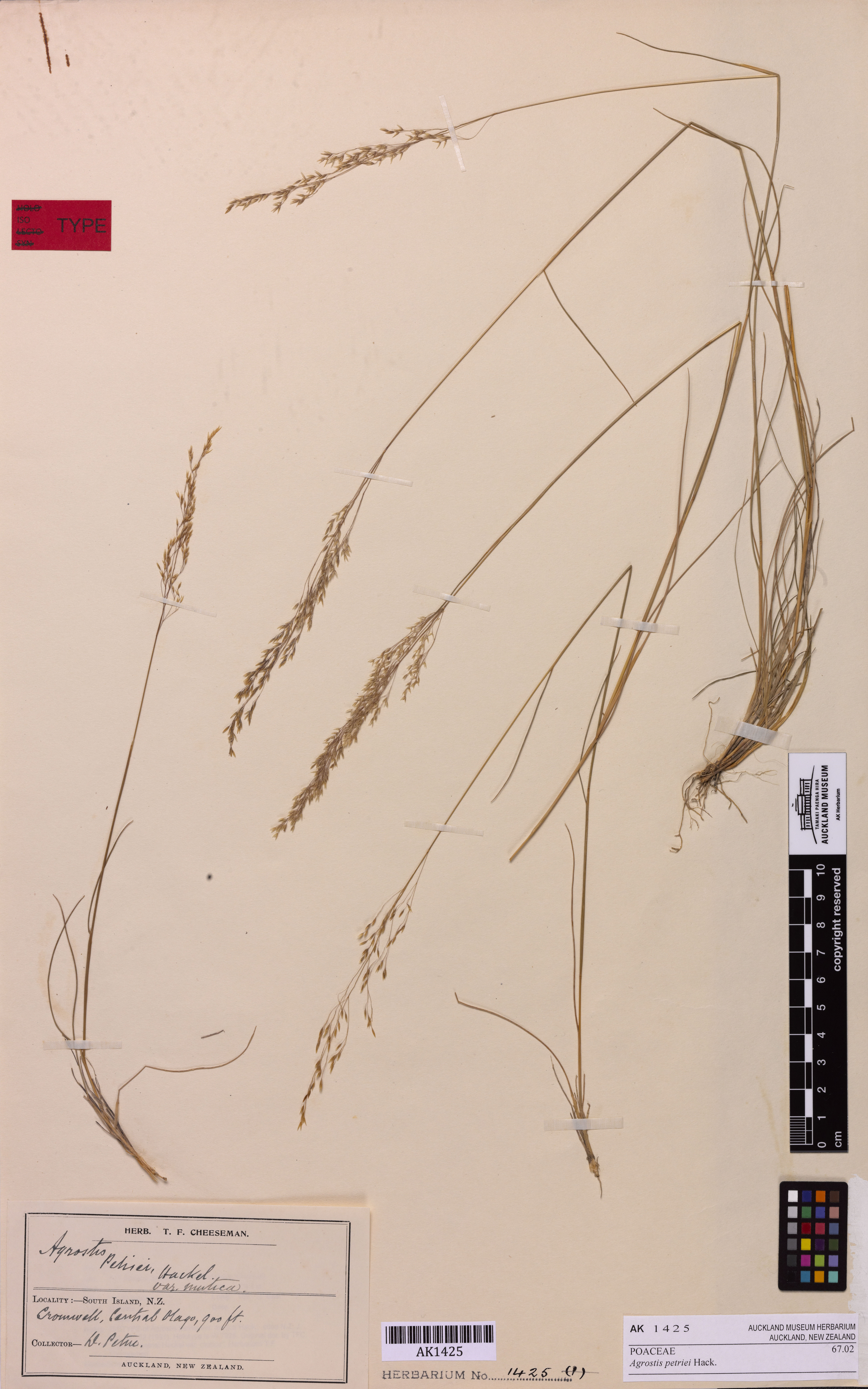

Conservation status
- Naturally Uncommon (NZ TCS)

Scientific classification
- Kingdom: Plantae
- Clade: Tracheophytes
- Clade: Angiosperms
- Clade: Monocots
- Clade: Commelinids
- Order: Poales
- Family: Poaceae
- Subfamily: Pooideae
- Genus: Agrostis
- Species: A. petriei

Binomial name
- Agrostis petriei Hack.

= Agrostis petriei =

Species of plant

Agrostis petriei is a grass endemic to the South Island of New Zealand, which was described by Eduard Hackel.

== Description ==
Agrostis petriei is a short, tussocky grass with involute, wiry, densely scabrid-papillose, bluish or greyish green leaves, on branches that are intravaginal (with shoots emerging from within the sheath of the previous node). Its panicle is borne on a reddish finely scabrid culm, is open and spreading, with spikelets that are 2.5-3.4mm, containing a single floret.

Like all Agrostis native to Aotearoa/New Zealand, the palea is around 1/3rd of the length of the lemma, compared to 1/2-2/3rds in introduced species. Its open, spreading panicle rules out many indigenous species, and the thin folded leaves, and short spikelets rule out all others but Agrostis personata. From A. personata it is it is differentiated by its leaves that are involute, wiry, and densely scabrid-papillose.

== Distribution and habitat ==
Agrostis petriei is endemic the South Island of Aotearoa/New Zealand. There, it is found dryland areas from Canterbury to Central Otago.

It grows in montane to subalpine areas, in dry stony ground, cliff faces and rock outcrops, as well as on river flats and within tussock grassland. Unlike other indigenous Agrostis species, it is found largely in dry areas.

The type location was Nevis Valley, Hector Mountains, Central Otago, collected by Donald Petrie in February 1890.

== Threats ==
Agrostis petriei was deemed Not Threatened in 2023 under the New Zealand Threat Classification System. This was an improvement from previous treatments, where it was considered At Risk - Naturally Uncommon.

While no specific threats have been listed, the classifier Sparse, meaning that the plant is uncommon throughout its range, is attached to the designation. It is also recognised as data poor, indicating that there is limited information about its population size or trend.

== Taxonomy ==
Agrostis petriei was described by Eduard Hackel in 1903. In the original description, Hackel included two varieties, one (var. mutica), defined by having awnless lemmas, and one (var. petriei), defined by having awned lemmas. In 1991, Edgar and Ford synonymised these varieties.

=== Etymology ===
Agrostis - from the Greek agrostis (a forage plant, a kind of grass), cf. agros (a field).

petriei - named after Scottish botanist Donald Petrie, 1846-1925, who collected the type specimen of A. petriei.
