= Agrostis delislei =

Scientific classification
- Kingdom: Plantae
- Clade: Tracheophytes
- Clade: Angiosperms
- Clade: Monocots
- Clade: Commelinids
- Order: Poales
- Family: Poaceae
- Subfamily: Pooideae
- Genus: Agrostis
- Species: A. delislei

Binomial name
- Agrostis delislei Hemsl.

Species of grass

Agrostis delislei is a species of flowering plant in the family Poaceae. It is endemic to the subantarctic Amsterdam Island. It was first described by William Hemsley in 1884.
