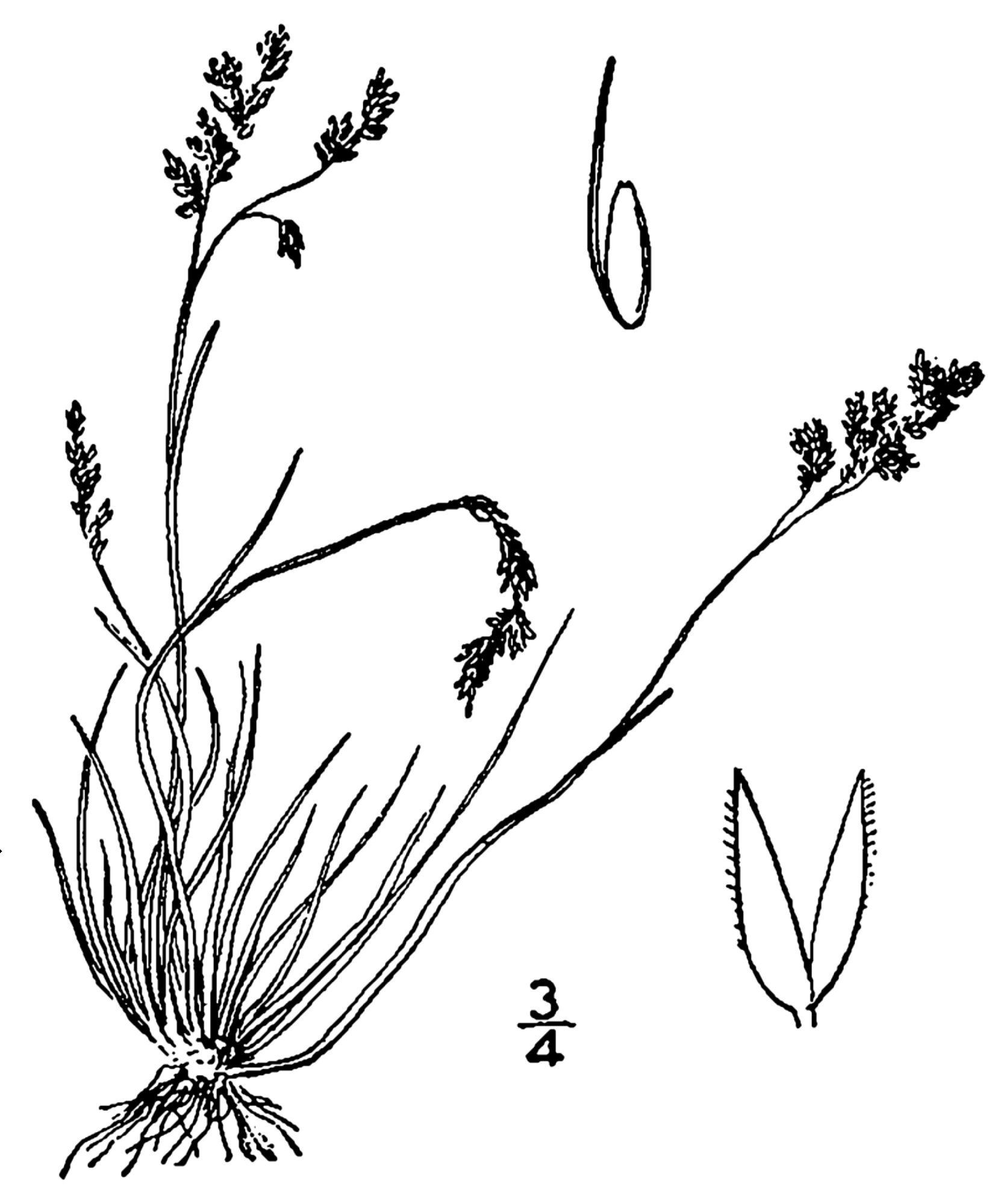

Scientific classification
- Kingdom: Plantae
- Clade: Tracheophytes
- Clade: Angiosperms
- Clade: Monocots
- Clade: Commelinids
- Order: Poales
- Family: Poaceae
- Subfamily: Pooideae
- Genus: Agrostis
- Species: A. mertensii

Binomial name
- Agrostis mertensii Trin.

= Agrostis mertensii =

Species of grass

Agrostis mertensii is a species of grass belonging to the family Poaceae.

It has almost cosmopolitan distribution.
