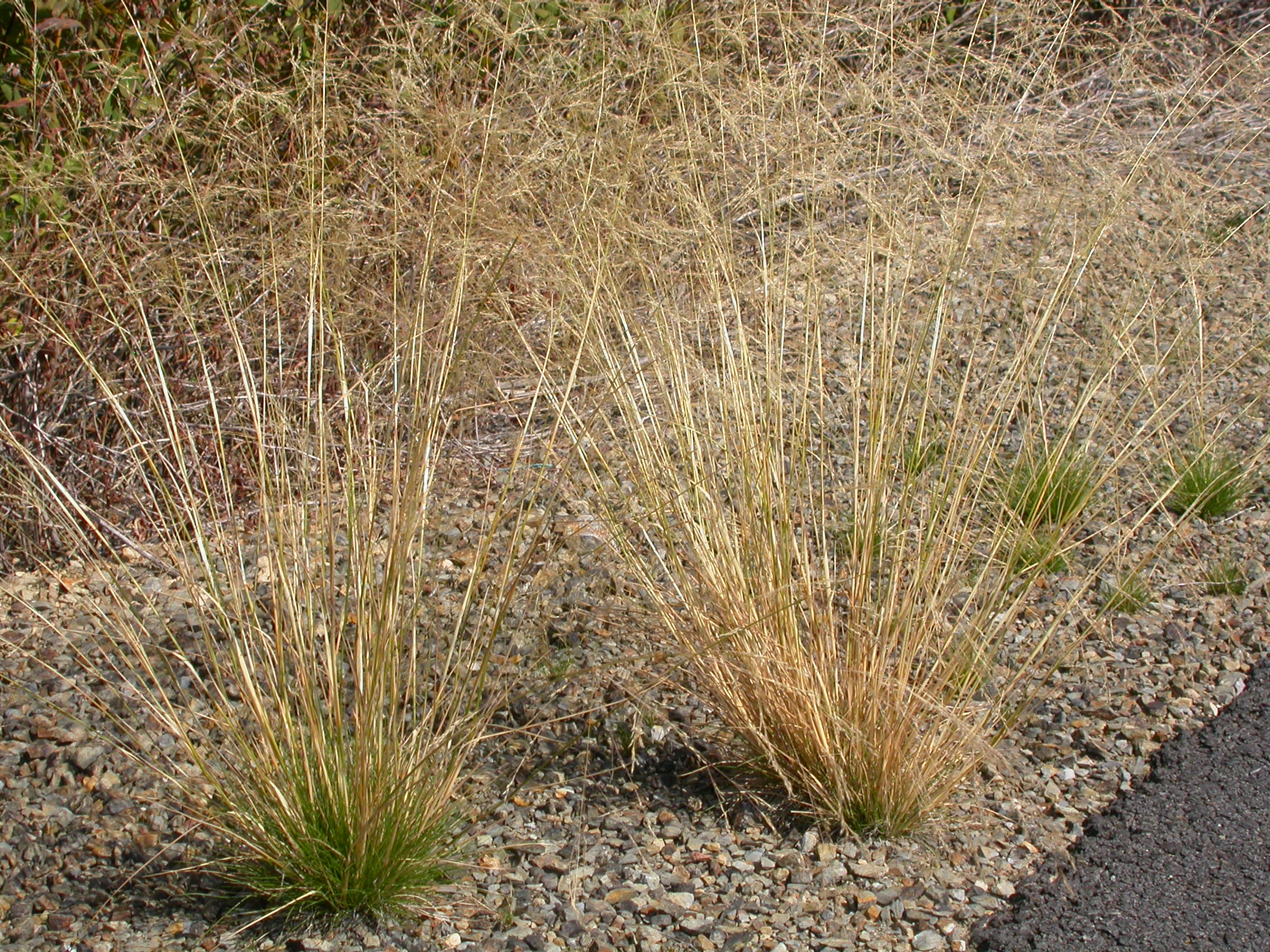

Conservation status
- Secure (NatureServe)

Scientific classification
- Kingdom: Plantae
- Clade: Tracheophytes
- Clade: Angiosperms
- Clade: Monocots
- Clade: Commelinids
- Order: Poales
- Family: Poaceae
- Subfamily: Pooideae
- Genus: Agrostis
- Species: A. scabra

Binomial name
- Agrostis scabra Willd.

Synonyms
- Agrostis geminata Agrostis hyemalis

= Agrostis scabra =

Species of grass

Agrostis scabra is a common species of grass known by the common names hair grass, rough bent, rough bent grass, winter bent grass, and ticklegrass. A tumbleweed, it is a bunchgrass native to Asia and much of North America, and widely known elsewhere as an introduced species.

== Distribution ==
It occurs in most of the United States except parts of the Southeast and in most of Canada except for the farthest northern regions. It can be found in Mexico and California, and across Alaska to far eastern Asia as far south as Korea.

It is resident in a great variety of habitats, from warm coastal valleys to the alpine climate of high mountain ranges. It has been observed on cliffs, in forests, at forest edges, in meadows and fields, and at the shores of rivers and lakes.

== Description ==
Agrostis scabra is a perennial bunchgrass growing mainly upright in form to heights of 6–39 in (15–99 cm), but reaching as high as 50 in (130 cm). It has been found growing as high as 12,000 ft (3,658 m) in Colorado. The leaves are rough with tiny hairs and up to about 14 centimeters long. The inflorescence breaks off of the plant at maturity and is dispersed by wind. The plant is often confused with Agrostis hyemalis, but Agrostis scabra tends to flower later in the year.

== Uses ==
The tolerance of this grass to alpine climates makes it a good plant to use in revegetating disturbed land in such regions. It is known to respond to burning with increased growth. It is known to spring up on sites where few other plants can grow, such as abandoned coal mines and soils polluted with sulfur, copper, and nickel. Prior to flowering, cattle, sheep, and horses readily consume it; it is also occasionally consumed by wild animals and after flowering by livestock.
