= Agrostis clavata =

Conservation status
- Least Concern (IUCN 3.1)

- Apparently Secure (NatureServe)

Scientific classification
- Kingdom: Plantae
- Clade: Tracheophytes
- Clade: Angiosperms
- Clade: Monocots
- Clade: Commelinids
- Order: Poales
- Family: Poaceae
- Subfamily: Pooideae
- Genus: Agrostis
- Species: A. clavata

Binomial name
- Agrostis clavata Trin.

Species of plant

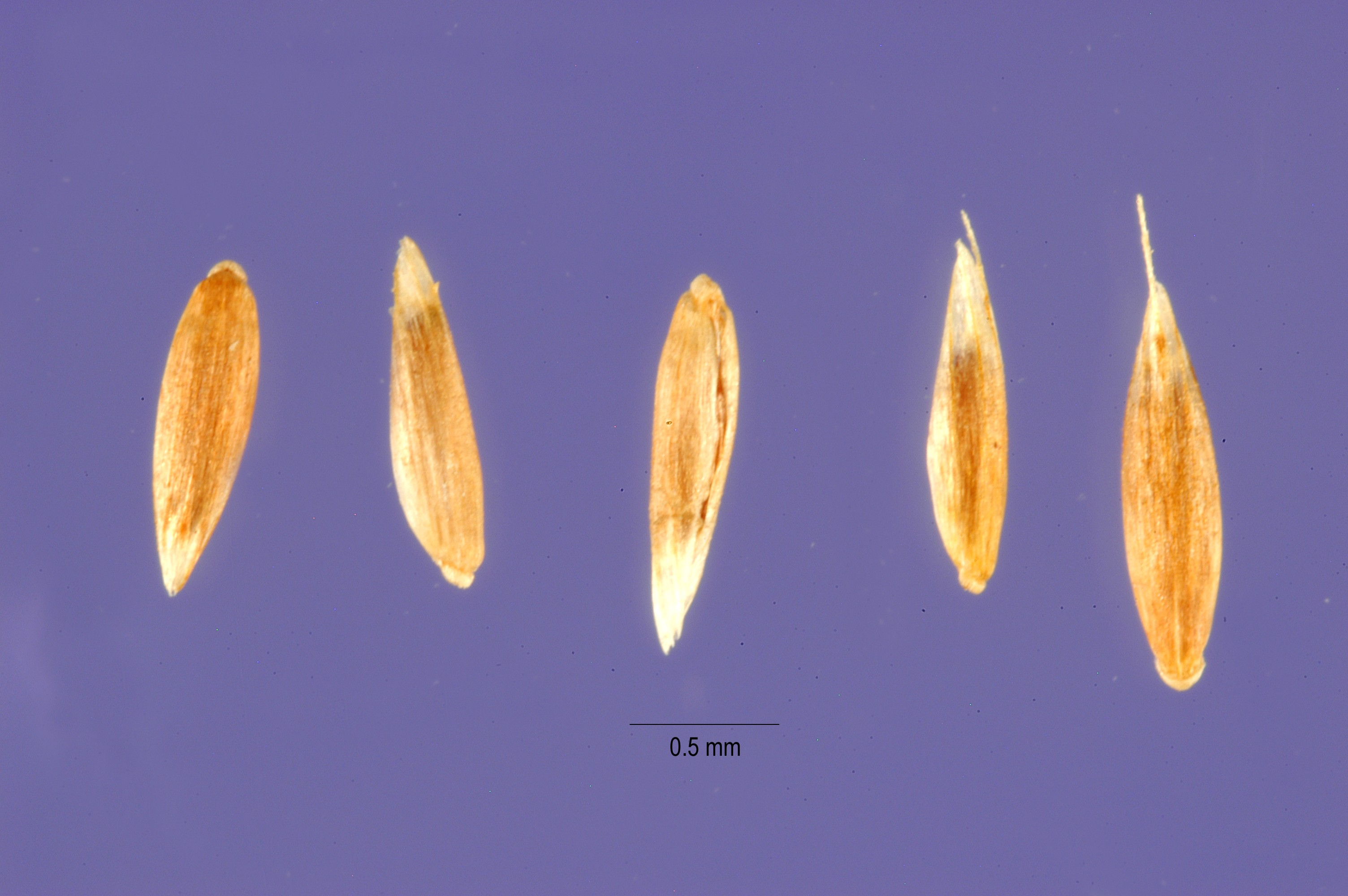
Agrostis clavata seeds

Agrostis clavata is a species of flowering plant in the family Poaceae, known by the common names clubbed bent or clavate bent. It has a very wide native distribution, from northern Europe to temperate East Asia and New Guinea, and in Alaska and Yukon in North America. In 2021, A. clavata was first identified in India, in the state of Sikkim. A. clavata was first described by Trin. in 1821.

== Conservation status ==
Agrostis clavata has possibly been extirpated from the Yukon, and remains critically imperiled in Alaska. Nonetheless, it remains widespread throughout its Asian and European range.
