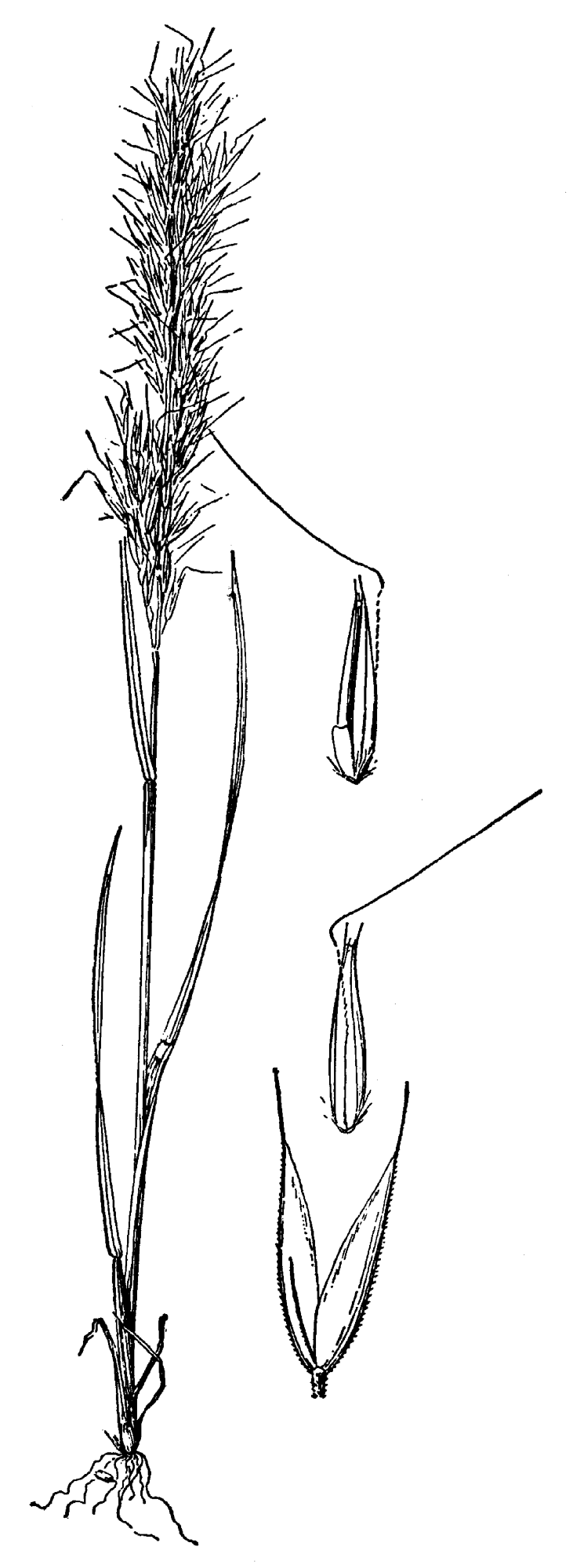

Conservation status
- Imperiled (NatureServe)

Scientific classification
- Kingdom: Plantae
- Clade: Tracheophytes
- Clade: Angiosperms
- Clade: Monocots
- Clade: Commelinids
- Order: Poales
- Family: Poaceae
- Subfamily: Pooideae
- Genus: Agrostis
- Species: A. hendersonii

Binomial name
- Agrostis hendersonii Hitchc.

Synonyms
- Agrostis aristiglumis

= Agrostis hendersonii =

Species of flowering plant

Agrostis hendersonii is an uncommon species of grass known by the common name Henderson's bent grass. It is native to northern California and Oregon, where it is a rare member of the flora in scattered vernal pool habitats. It is an annual grass ranging in maximum height from 6 to 70 centimeters. It has short, narrow leaves only a few centimeters long. The inflorescence is a dense, narrow, cylindrical tuft no longer than 5 centimeters in length, made up of small spikelets with hairlike tips and bent awns.
