= Agrostis goughensis =

Conservation status
- Data Deficient (IUCN 3.1)

Scientific classification
- Kingdom: Plantae
- Clade: Tracheophytes
- Clade: Angiosperms
- Clade: Monocots
- Clade: Commelinids
- Order: Poales
- Family: Poaceae
- Subfamily: Pooideae
- Genus: Agrostis
- Species: A. goughensis

Binomial name
- Agrostis goughensis C.E.Hubbard

Species of grass

Agrostis goughensis is a species of grass in the family Poaceae. It is found on Gough Island.
