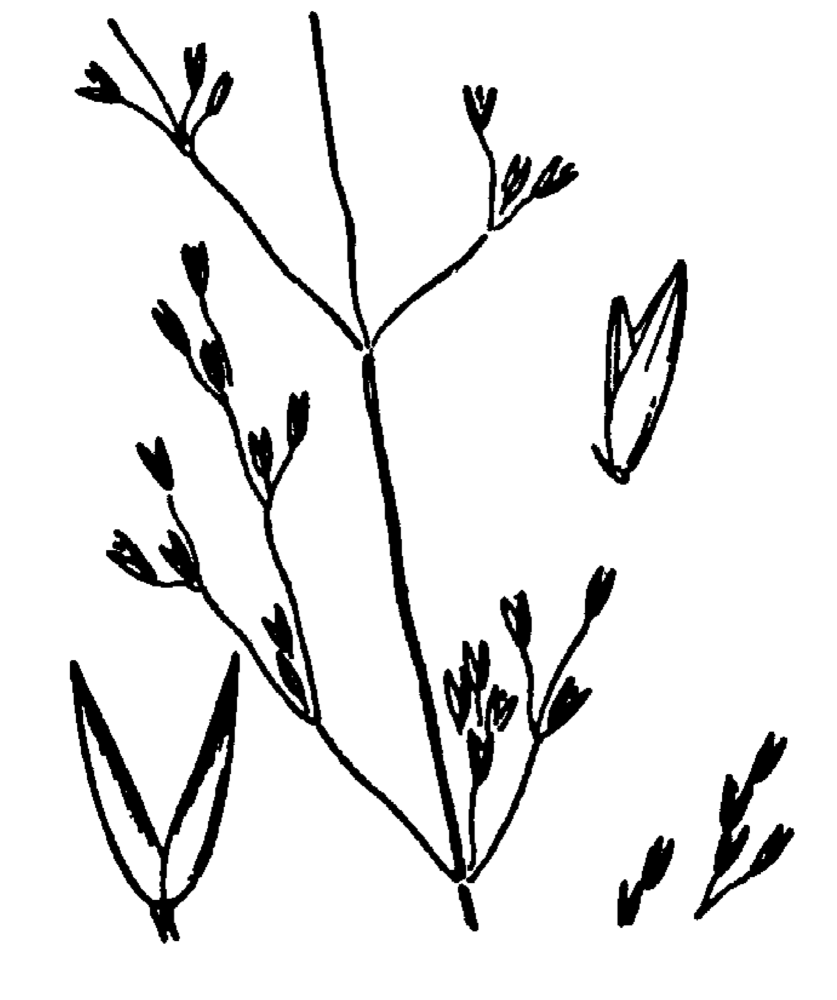
- Drawing of Agrostis humilis

Scientific classification
- Kingdom: Plantae
- Clade: Tracheophytes
- Clade: Angiosperms
- Clade: Monocots
- Clade: Commelinids
- Order: Poales
- Family: Poaceae
- Subfamily: Pooideae
- Genus: Agrostis
- Species: A. humilis

Binomial name
- Agrostis humilis Vasey

Synonyms
- Podagrostis humilis

= Agrostis humilis =

Species of grass

Agrostis humilis is a species of grass known by the common names of mountain bent grass and alpine bentgrass, which can be found in Western United States and Canada.

== Description ==
The plant perennial and caespitose while it culms are 5–10 centimetres (2.0–3.9 in) long. The eciliate membrane have a 0.5–1 millimetre (0.020–0.039 in) long ligule which is also both erose and truncate. It have filiformed and flat leaf-blades which are 2–10 centimetres (0.79–3.94 in) long and 0.5–1 millimetre (0.020–0.039 in) wide. The panicle is inflorescenced and is 1.5–2.5 centimetres (0.59–0.98 in) by 0.5 centimetres (0.20 in) and is linear with the main branches being appressed. Spikelets are 2 millimetres (0.079 in) long and are both elliptic and solitary. They also carry both a pediceled fertile spikelet and one fertile floret which have a hairless callus.

The glumes are 2 millimetres (0.079 in) long, lanceolate, membranous and have acute apexes. Fertile lemma is of the same size as glumes and is both elliptic and hyaline. It have hyaline palea which is 0.66–0.75 millimetres (0.026–0.030 in) long with rhachilla is extended at 0–0.15 millimetres (0.0000–0.0059 in). Flowers are membranous and 0.3 millimetres (0.012 in) long with two lodicules. They also have three stamens which are 0.6–0.7 millimetres (0.024–0.028 in) long with fruits being caryopses, having an additional pericarp and linear. hilum.

== Conservation ==
In California, the plant is considered endangered.
