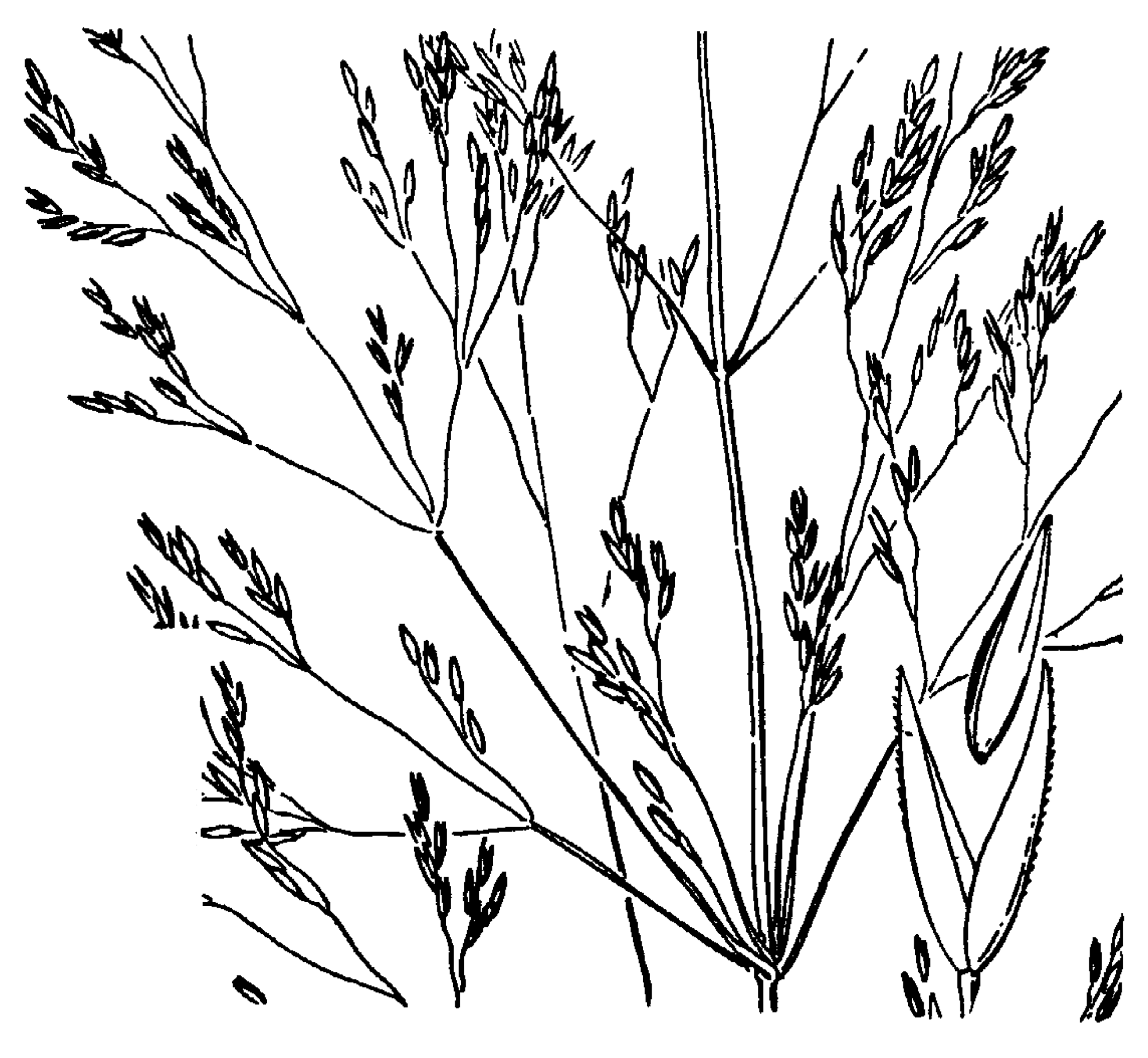

Conservation status
- Secure (NatureServe)

Scientific classification
- Kingdom: Plantae
- Clade: Tracheophytes
- Clade: Angiosperms
- Clade: Monocots
- Clade: Commelinids
- Order: Poales
- Family: Poaceae
- Subfamily: Pooideae
- Genus: Agrostis
- Species: A. oregonensis

Binomial name
- Agrostis oregonensis Vasey

= Agrostis oregonensis =

Species of flowering plant

Agrostis oregonensis is a species of grass known by the common name Oregon bent grass. It is native to western North America from Alaska to California to Wyoming, where it grows in several habitat types.

== Description ==
It is a perennial bunchgrass growing in 75 centimeters tall. The leaves are flat and up to 30 centimeters long. The inflorescence is a wide open array of wispy branches bearing clusters of spikelets each a few millimeters long.
