= Agrostis trachychlaena =

Conservation status
- Endangered (IUCN 3.1)

Scientific classification
- Kingdom: Plantae
- Clade: Tracheophytes
- Clade: Angiosperms
- Clade: Monocots
- Clade: Commelinids
- Order: Poales
- Family: Poaceae
- Subfamily: Pooideae
- Genus: Agrostis
- Species: A. trachychlaena

Binomial name
- Agrostis trachychlaena C.E.Hubbard

Species of grass

Agrostis trachychlaena is a species of grass in the family Poaceae. It is endemic to Inaccessible and Nightingale Islands, Tristan da Cunha. Its natural habitat is subantarctic grassland.

Less than 250 mature individuals are thought to exist.
