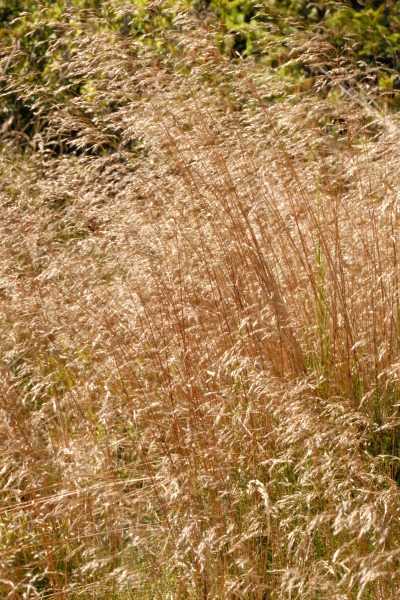

Conservation status
- Least Concern (IUCN 3.1)

Scientific classification
- Kingdom: Plantae
- Clade: Tracheophytes
- Clade: Angiosperms
- Clade: Monocots
- Clade: Commelinids
- Order: Poales
- Family: Poaceae
- Subfamily: Pooideae
- Genus: Agrostis
- Species: A. canina

Binomial name
- Agrostis canina L.

= Agrostis canina =

Species of grass

Agrostis canina, the velvety bentgrass, brown bent or velvet bent, is a species of grass in the family Poaceae.

== Description ==
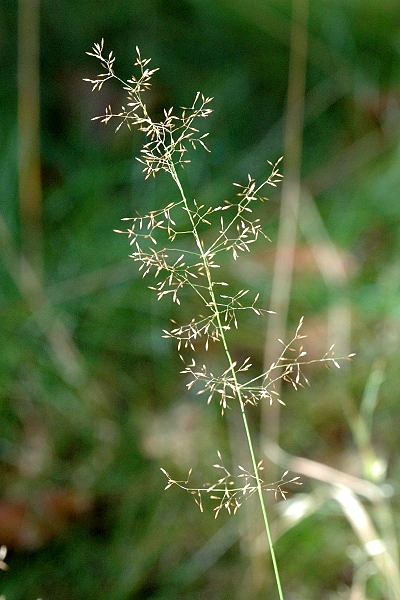
Inflorescence

Agrostis canina is a perennial plant, with stolons but no rhizomes, and culms which grow to a height of up to 75 centimetres (30 in). It is frequently confused with Agrostis vinealis (formerly treated as a subspecies or variety of A. canina), which grows in more upland habitats and has rhizomes rather than stolons.

The leaf blades are 2–15 cm (0.8–5.9 in) long and 1–3 mm (0.04–0.12 in) wide, with an acute or acuminate ligule up to 4 mm (0.16 in) long.

The plant flowers from May to July, and the inflorescence is a panicle 3–16 cm (1.2–6.3 in) long and up to 7 cm (2.8 in) wide, with rough branches. Each spikelet is 1.9–2.5 mm (0.07–0.10 in) long; the lemma is 1.6 mm (0.063 in) long with an awn attached around the middle.

== Distribution and ecology ==
The range of Agrostis canina covers most of Europe and temperate parts of Asia, and extends from sea level to the alpine zone. It has also been introduced to eastern North America, Hawaiʻi, Algeria and the Kerguelen Islands.

Agrostis canina is sensitive to drought, but is common in damp places, including ditches and lake margins.

The short, green growth of A. canina has made it popular as a lawn grass.
