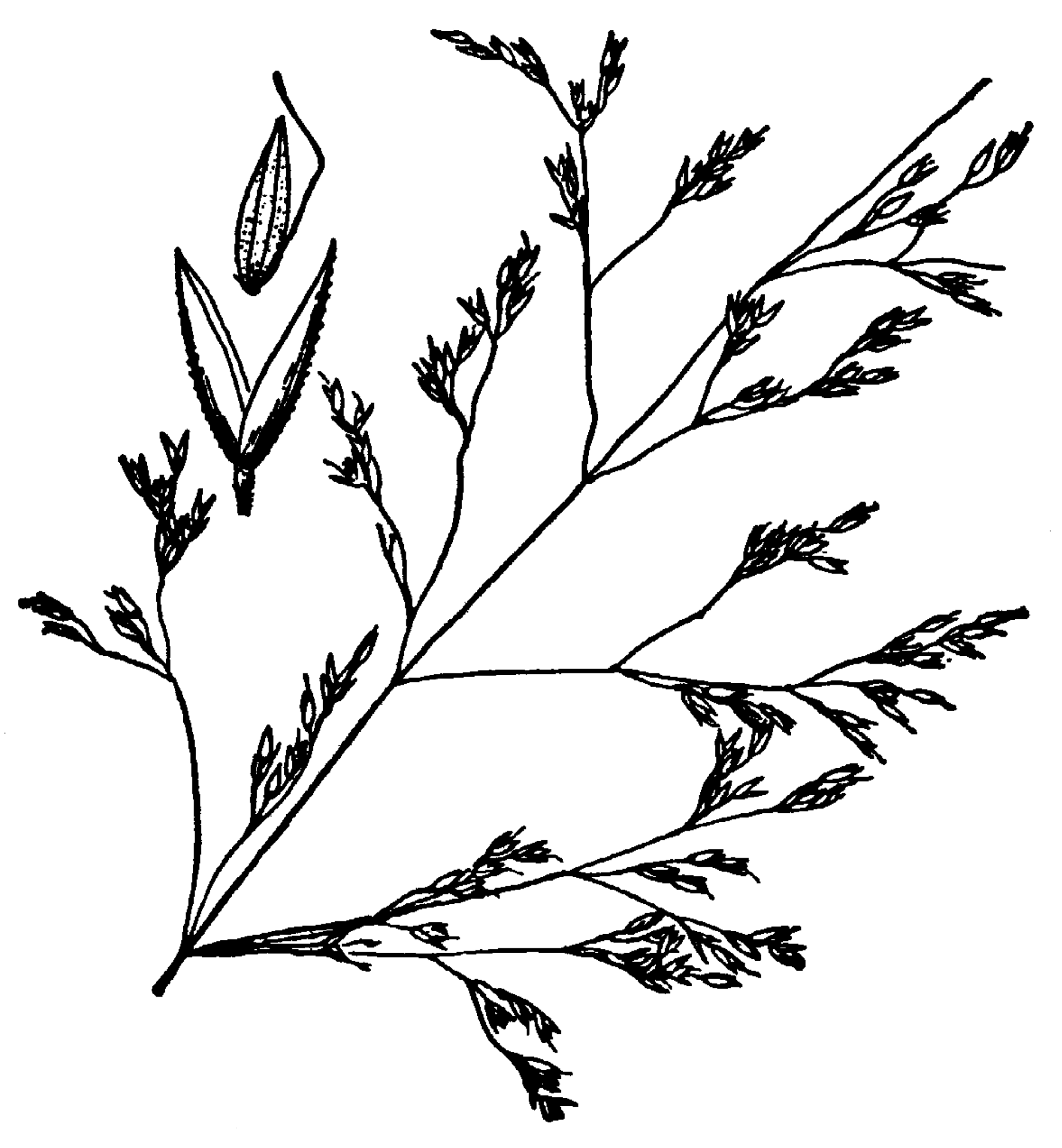

Conservation status
- Imperiled (NatureServe)

Scientific classification
- Kingdom: Plantae
- Clade: Tracheophytes
- Clade: Angiosperms
- Clade: Monocots
- Clade: Commelinids
- Order: Poales
- Family: Poaceae
- Subfamily: Pooideae
- Genus: Agrostis
- Species: A. hooveri

Binomial name
- Agrostis hooveri Swallen

= Agrostis hooveri =

Species of flowering plant

Agrostis hooveri is a species of grass known by the common name Hoover's bent grass. It is endemic to California, where it is known only from western San Luis Obispo and Santa Barbara Counties.

== Description ==
It grows in woodland and chaparral in hilly terrain. This is a perennial grass growing in tufts 30 to 80 centimeters tall. The inflorescence is an array of thin branches bearing tiny spikelets each a few millimeters long.
