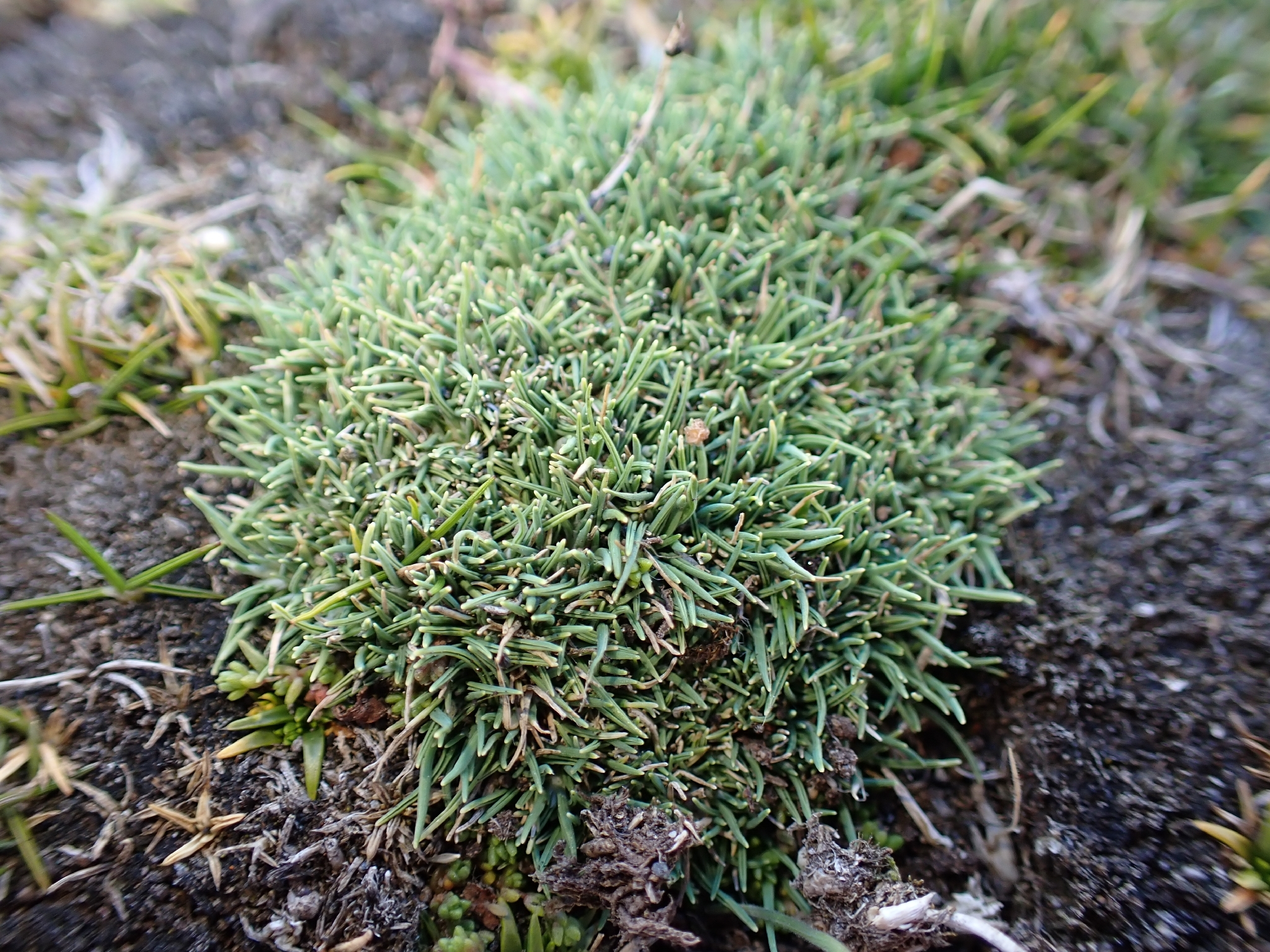
- In South Taranaki District

Scientific classification
- Kingdom: Plantae
- Clade: Embryophytes
- Clade: Tracheophytes
- Clade: Angiosperms
- Clade: Monocots
- Clade: Commelinids
- Order: Poales
- Family: Poaceae
- Subfamily: Pooideae
- Genus: Agrostis
- Species: A. muscosa

Binomial name
- Agrostis muscosa Kirk

= Agrostis muscosa =

Species of plant

Agrostis muscosa, or 'pincushion grass,' is a species of true grass (Poaceae) endemic to Aotearoa New Zealand.

== Description ==
A. muscosa is a short, perennial tufted grass that forms rounded cushions or mats up to 10cm in diameter. The leaves are involute, blueish green, and typically short (up to 4cm x 0.4 mm). The culms are short, with the panicles being hidden under the leaves. Like all Agrostis, it has one floret per spikelet.

A. muscosa has the chromosome count 2n = 42.

In cultivation, A. muscosa becomes lank, and as tall as 20cm. The leaves also become substantially less involute, and there is a decreased number of stomata.

== Distribution ==
A. muscosa is endemic to Aotearoa New Zealand.

In the North Island, it is present in montane to alpine areas in the Volcanic Plateau, Ruahine and Tararua Ranges, and Mt Taranaki. On the coasts, it is found in the eastern Bay of Plenty, Taranaki, and the South Wellington coasts.

On the South Island, it is found throughout, but is not present in Fiordland or Westland. It is most common in South Canterbury, Otago, and Southland.

It is also found on Stewart Island and Rangatira Island in the Chatham Islands.

The holotype was collected by Colenso at the "Summit of Ruahine Mountains", while the lectotype was collected in 1877 at Lake Wanaka by Kirk.

== Habitat ==
Mainly found in montane and subalpine areas, and is rarely alpine and coastal. It grows in open habitat, on stone pavements on edges of tarns and lake, in sparse tussock grassland, and in fell field. In lowlands it is found in coastal turf and gravel.

A. muscosa is reportedly present as a weed on many bowling greens.

In coastal communities on the south Taranaki to Wanganui coastline, A. muscosa grows in coastal turf communities dominated by Zoysia minima, along with Crassula manaia, Colobanthus muelleri, and Myosotis pygmaea. Similar communities exist on coastal cliffs in Southland, with turfs dominated by Goodenia radicans and Leptinella dioica.

On the edges of montane Lake Marymere in Canterbury, A. muscosa grows in gravel lake turf with Limosella lineata, Carex gaudichaudiana, Galium perpusillum, and Lobelia perpusilla.

== Threats ==
A. muscosa is Not Threatened nationally in Aotearoa New Zealand, but is regionally At Risk - Declining in the Otago Region.

== Taxonomy ==
In Kirk's description of A. muscosa, he points out that it was confused with A. subulata in the Handbook of the New Zealand Flora, Buchanan's Indigenous Grasses of New Zealand, and Hooker's Flora Antarctica, as well as A. canina in part of the Handbook of the New Zealand Flora.

It was finally described by Thomas Kirk in 1880.

=== Etymology ===
Agrostis - from the Greek agrostis (a forage plant, a kind of grass), cf. agros (a field).

muscosa - From the Latin muscosa, meaning 'mossy'.
