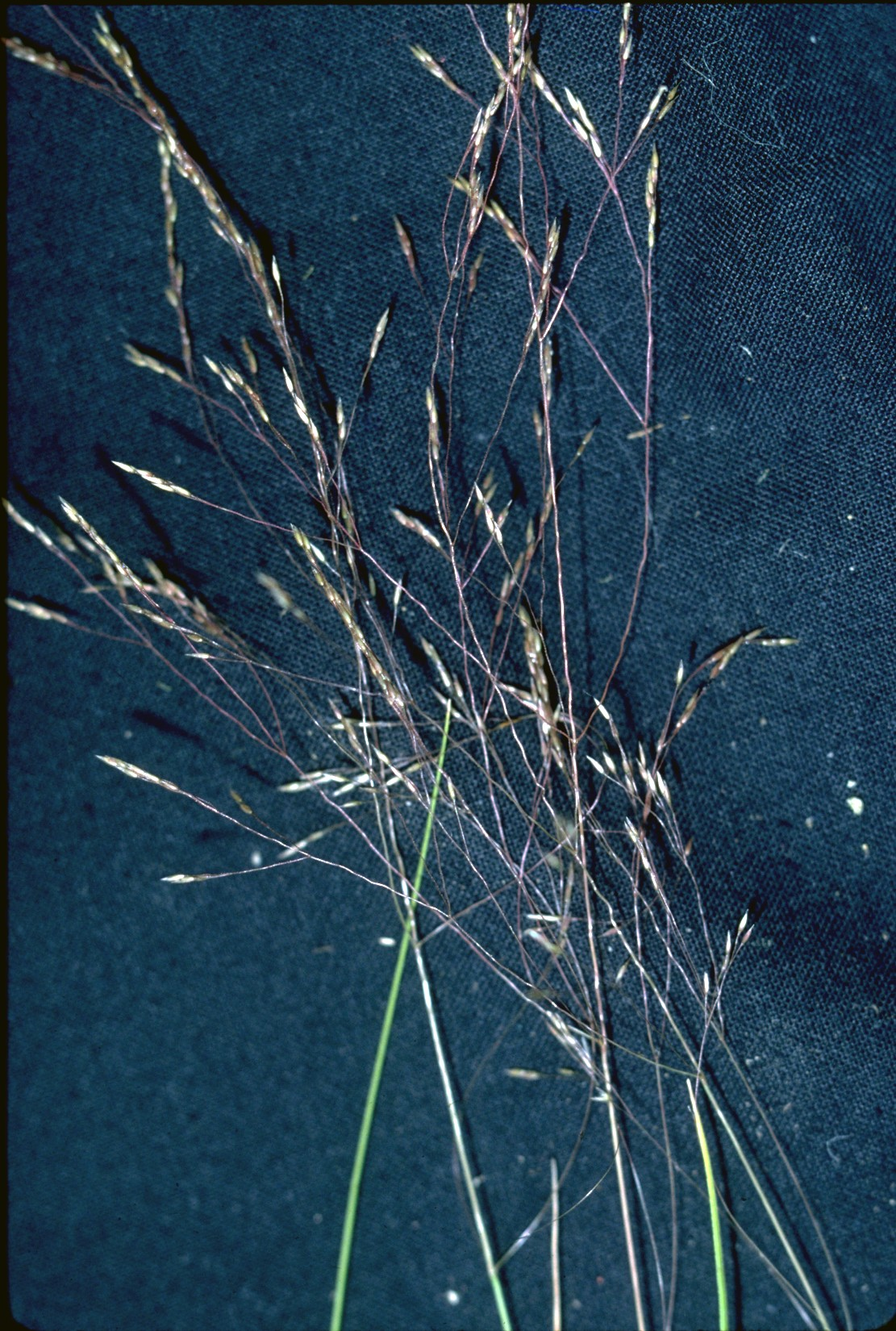

Scientific classification
- Kingdom: Plantae
- Clade: Tracheophytes
- Clade: Angiosperms
- Clade: Monocots
- Clade: Commelinids
- Order: Poales
- Family: Poaceae
- Subfamily: Pooideae
- Genus: Agrostis
- Species: A. idahoensis

Binomial name
- Agrostis idahoensis Nash

Synonyms
- Agrostis tenuis

= Agrostis idahoensis =

Species of flowering plant

Agrostis idahoensis is a species of grass known by the common name Idaho bent grass. It is native to western North America from Alaska to California to Colorado, where it grows in several habitat types.

== Description ==
It is a perennial grass growing in short tufts up to 30 centimeters tall. The leaves are thready and a few centimeters long. The inflorescence is an open, thin array of wispy branches bearing spikelets each a few millimeters long.
