= Agrostis tolucensis =

Scientific classification
- Kingdom: Plantae
- Clade: Tracheophytes
- Clade: Angiosperms
- Clade: Monocots
- Clade: Commelinids
- Order: Poales
- Family: Poaceae
- Subfamily: Pooideae
- Genus: Agrostis
- Species: A. tolucensis

Binomial name
- Agrostis tolucensis Kunth

Synonyms
- Agrostis hoffmannii Mez; Vilfa glomerata J. Presl

Species of grass

Agrostis tolucensis is a species of grass which is found in South America, the United States, and Mexico.

== Description ==
The plant is perennial and caespitose with culms being 8–32 centimetres (3.1–12.6 in) long and 0.5 millimetres (0.020 in) wide. It eciliate membrane have a ligule which is 2.8–4.5 millimetres (0.11–0.18 in) long with leaf-blades being erect, filiform, conduplicate, 5–10 centimetres (2.0–3.9 in) by 0.7–13 millimetres (0.028–0.512 in) and having ribbed surface as well. The panicle is 3–10 centimetres (1.2–3.9 in) long and 0.3–0.8 centimetres (0.12–0.31 in) wide. It is also inflorescenced, linear, and spiciform as well. Its peduncle is 4–8 centimetres (1.6–3.1 in) long while the main branches are appressed and are 0.5–2 metres (1 ft 8 in – 6 ft 7 in).

It have solitary spikelets which carry one fertile floret and have a pubescent callus. The spikelets themselves are elliptic, are 2.3–3.6 millimetres (0.091–0.142 in) long and carry filiformed pedicels which are 0.5–3 millimetres (0.020–0.118 in) long and scabrous as well. The species carry an ovate fertile lemma which is 2–2.8 millimetres (0.079–0.110 in) long and is keelless with dentate apex.

The glumes are purple in colour, oblong, membranous, have no lateral veins and have acute apexes. They also have one keel and one vein which is scabrous. The size is different though; Lower glume is 2.3–3.6 millimetres (0.091–0.142 in) long while the upper one is 2.1–3.2 millimetres (0.083–0.126 in). Flowers have two membranous lodicules and three stamens the latter of which are of the same colour as glumes and are 1 millimetre (0.039 in) long. They also carry two stigmas and three stamens the latter of which are 1–1.5 millimetres (0.039–0.059 in) long. The fruits are caryopses with an additional pericarp and linear hilum.

== Distribution ==
In Bolivia, the plant is found growing on the elevation of 2,500–5,000 metres (8,200–16,400 ft), depending on the province.
