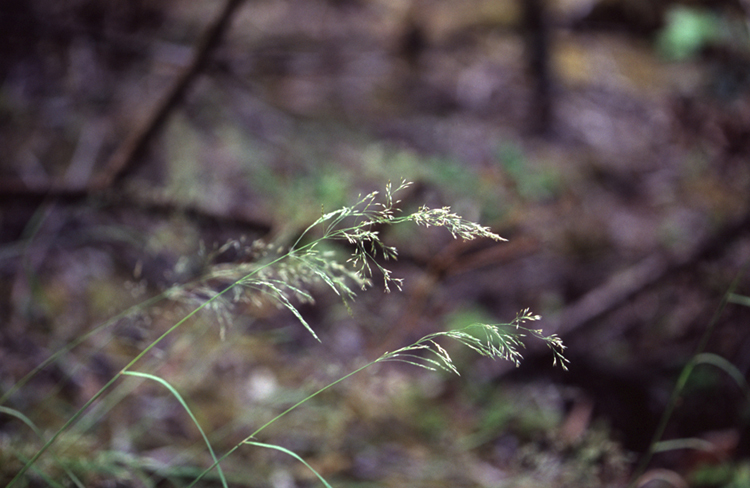

Conservation status
- Apparently Secure (NatureServe)

Scientific classification
- Kingdom: Plantae
- Clade: Tracheophytes
- Clade: Angiosperms
- Clade: Monocots
- Clade: Commelinids
- Order: Poales
- Family: Poaceae
- Subfamily: Pooideae
- Genus: Agrostis
- Species: A. hallii

Binomial name
- Agrostis hallii Vasey

= Agrostis hallii =

Species of flowering plant

Agrostis hallii is a species of grass known by the common names Hall's bentgrass, Hall redtop, and Hall's bent grass.

== Distribution ==
It is native to the west coast of the United States from far southern Washington to central California, where it grows in the woodlands and forests of the coastal mountain ranges.

== Description ==
This is a rhizomatous perennial grass growing up to about a meter tall. It has flat leaves up to 20 centimeters long and thin or dense inflorescences of spikelets. It ranges in size from 17 to 100 centimeters long. The rhizomes are less than 50 centimeters long. The ligules are between 4 and 7 millimeters. The flat proximal blades are between 7 and 20 millimeters long and between 2 and 5 millimeters wide. The inflorescence is between 7 and 22 centimeters in height. It is also either lanceolate or ovate in outline. The glumes are between 2.5 and 4 millimeters long. The callus hairs are between 1.5 and 2 millimeters long. The lemmas are between 2 and 3 millimeters long. The anthers are between 1.5 and 2.3 millimeters long. The flowering time is between the months of May to July. The bloom color is either yellow, green, or purple.
