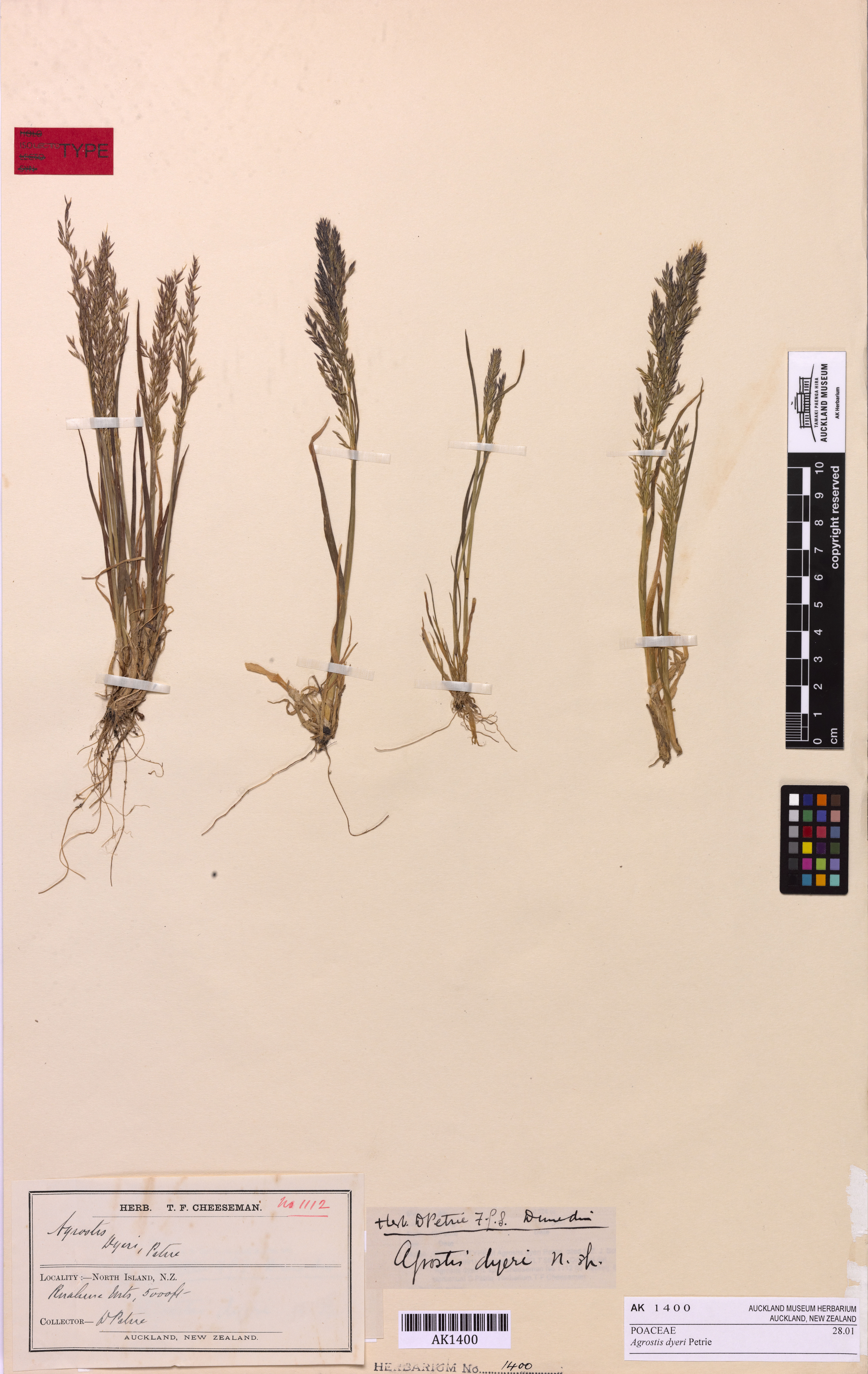

Conservation status
- Not Threatened (NZ TCS)

Scientific classification
- Kingdom: Plantae
- Clade: Tracheophytes
- Clade: Angiosperms
- Clade: Monocots
- Clade: Commelinids
- Order: Poales
- Family: Poaceae
- Subfamily: Pooideae
- Genus: Agrostis
- Species: A. dyeri

Binomial name
- Agrostis dyeri Petrie

= Agrostis dyeri =

Species of plant

Agrostis dyeri is a species of grass in the family Poaceae, endemic to the North and South Islands of New Zealand. It was described by Scottish-New Zealand botanist Donald Petrie in 1889.

== Habitat ==
A. dyeri grows in subalpine to alpine zones, in tussock grassland, scrub, herbfield and scree.

== Distribution ==
A. dyeri is endemic to the New Zealand North and South Islands. In the North, it is found from Mount Hikurangi south to Tararua Range, including Taranaki, the mountains of the Central Plateau, and Ruahine Ranges. South Island widespread west and south of main divide and Fiordland, in the east in Marlborough and Canterbury.

The type specimen, WELT 69294!, was collected on the eastern side of the Ruahine Ranges at around 1,400 meters above sea level by Donald Petrie in 1889.

== Description ==
A. dyeri forms stiff tufts 15-55 cm tall, with culms overtopping leaves and intravaginal branching. Culms are erect, bearing (4)-5-12-(20) cm panicles with narrowly branches, either contracted after flowering or remaining open. The spikelets are 3-3.5-(4) mm, green to brownish purple, with equal glumes, 2.3-3.3 mm awnless or finely awned lemmas. The palea is 0.5-0.8 mm.

A. dyeri is a septoploid, with 2n = 42 chromosomes.

== Ecology ==
A. dyeri is a host of Ovularia pusilla, a fungus that causes leaf spots. It is also a host of Puccinia coronata, a rust fungus that grows on grass leaves.

== Taxonomy ==
A. dyeri was described by Scottish-New Zealand botanist Donald Petrie in 1889, and has retained its name since.

Two forms can be found in A. dyeri. Throughout its range one form has a contracted panicle after flowering, and has smooth leaf sheaths and anthers 0.6-0.8mm long. In drier parts of the South Island, however, the panicle remains open after flowering, the leaf sheaths scabrous and the anthers 0.8-1.2 mm long. Druce stated that "Occasionally plants of the two may be found growing side by side in the same community".

Hybrids between A. dyeri and naturalised A. capillaris were recorded by Alan Cockayne and H. Allan in 1935, and were described as common. Putative hybrids have not been recorded since.

Agrostis personata used to be called Agrostis dyeri var delicatior, but was elevated to a full species by Elizabeth Edgar in 1991.

=== Etymology ===
Agrostis - from the Latin and Greek names for bent grasses, from Greek agron or agros, field or pasture.

dyeri - Named for Sir William Turner Thiselton-Dyer, a 19th-century director of the Royal Botanic Gardens at Kew.

== Gallery ==
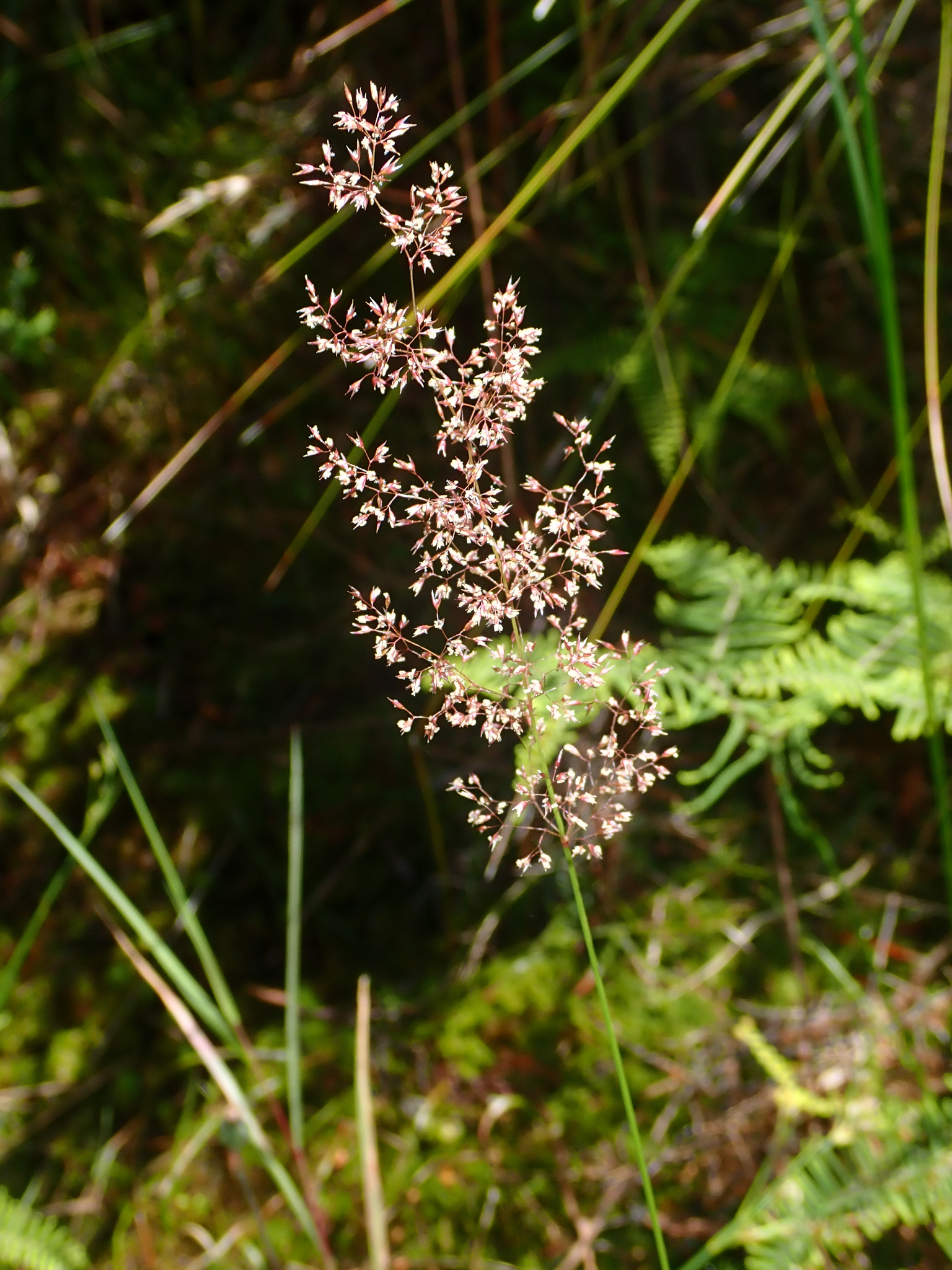
panicle

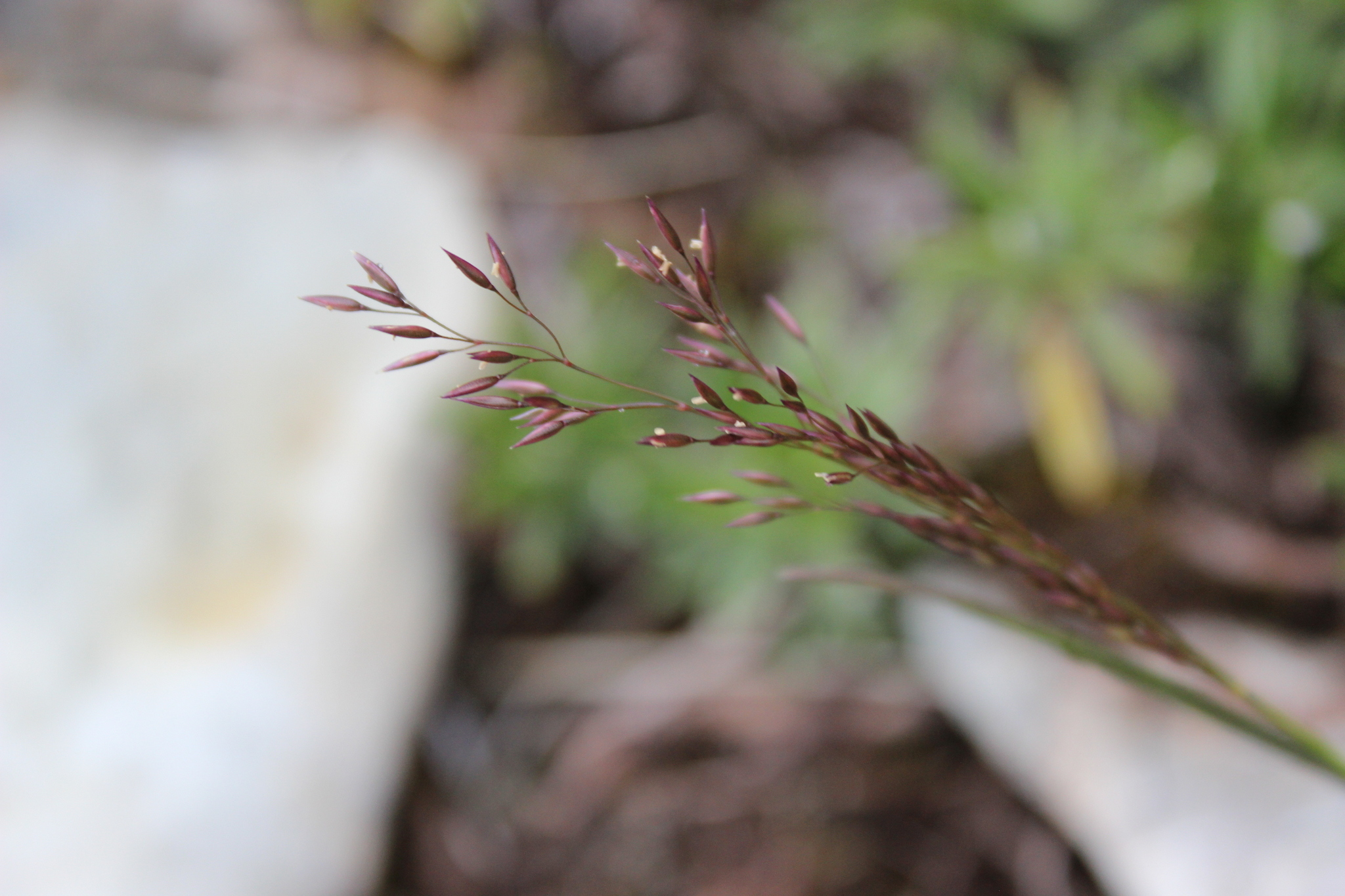
Spikelets

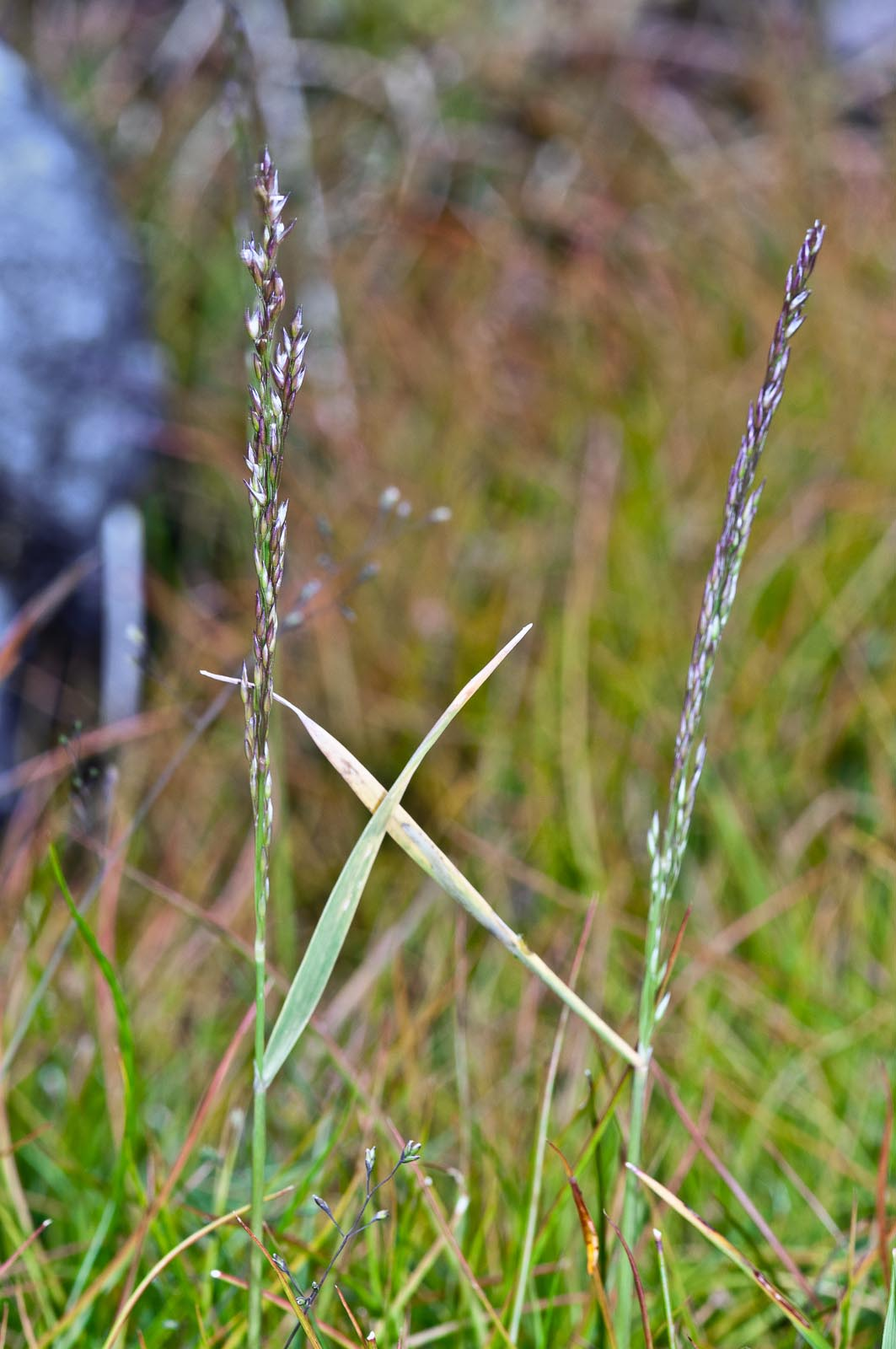
panicles

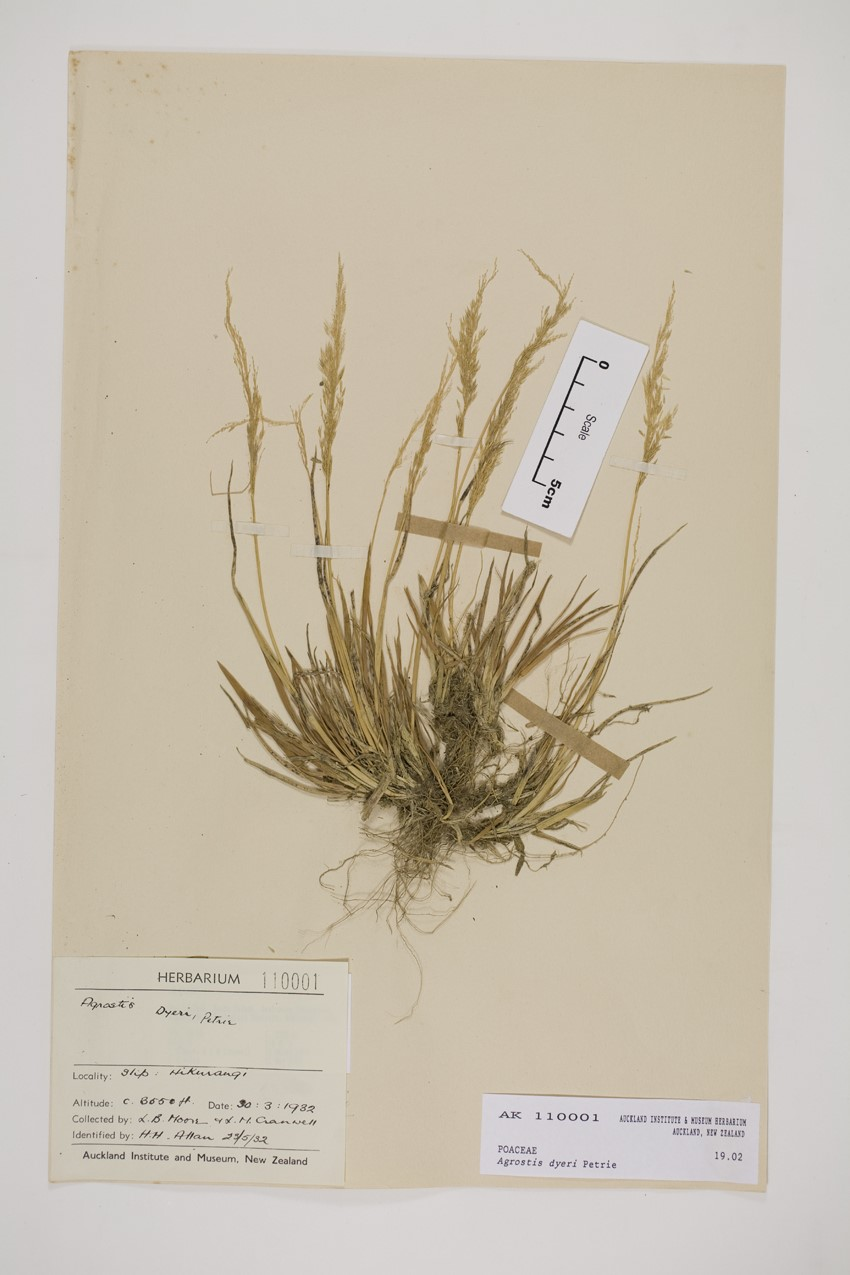
Specimen
