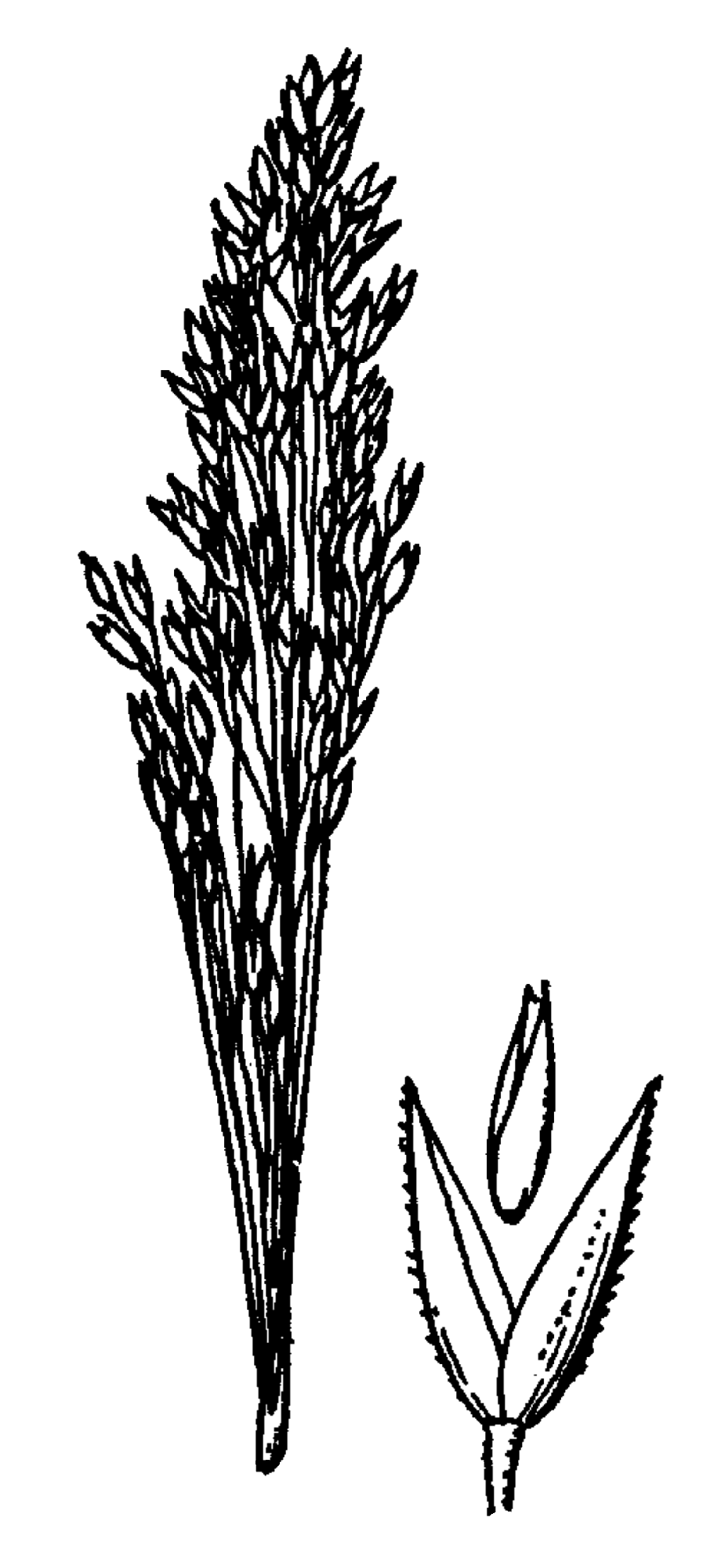

Scientific classification
- Kingdom: Plantae
- Clade: Tracheophytes
- Clade: Angiosperms
- Clade: Monocots
- Clade: Commelinids
- Order: Poales
- Family: Poaceae
- Subfamily: Pooideae
- Genus: Agrostis
- Species: A. rossiae

Binomial name
- Agrostis rossiae Vasey

= Agrostis rossiae =

Species of flowering plant

Agrostis rossiae, or Ross' bentgrass, is a species of perennial or annual grass that is endemic to the Firehole River drainage and Shoshone Geyser Basin of Yellowstone National Park. It is one of 3 endemic plants to the park.

== Range ==
Endemic to the Firehole River drainage and Shoshone Geyser Basin of Yellowstone National Park.

== Habitat and ecology ==
This plant only grows in the thermal water, where the combination of moisture and warmth create a natural greenhouse. Because of warmth of the ground soil, seeds tend to germinate in December or January, producing a green presence in thermal areas by late winter. Flowers tend to emerge in May or June, and by July the plants dead due to the heat from above and below.

== Taxonomy ==
There are possibly two or three species of thermal bentgrasses that may be present in Yellowstone, but more research should be conducted before a taxonomic decision is made.

== Conservation ==
This species is listed a G1 Critically Imperiled by NatureServe, primarily threatened by the encroachment of Agrostis scabra and recreational activities.
