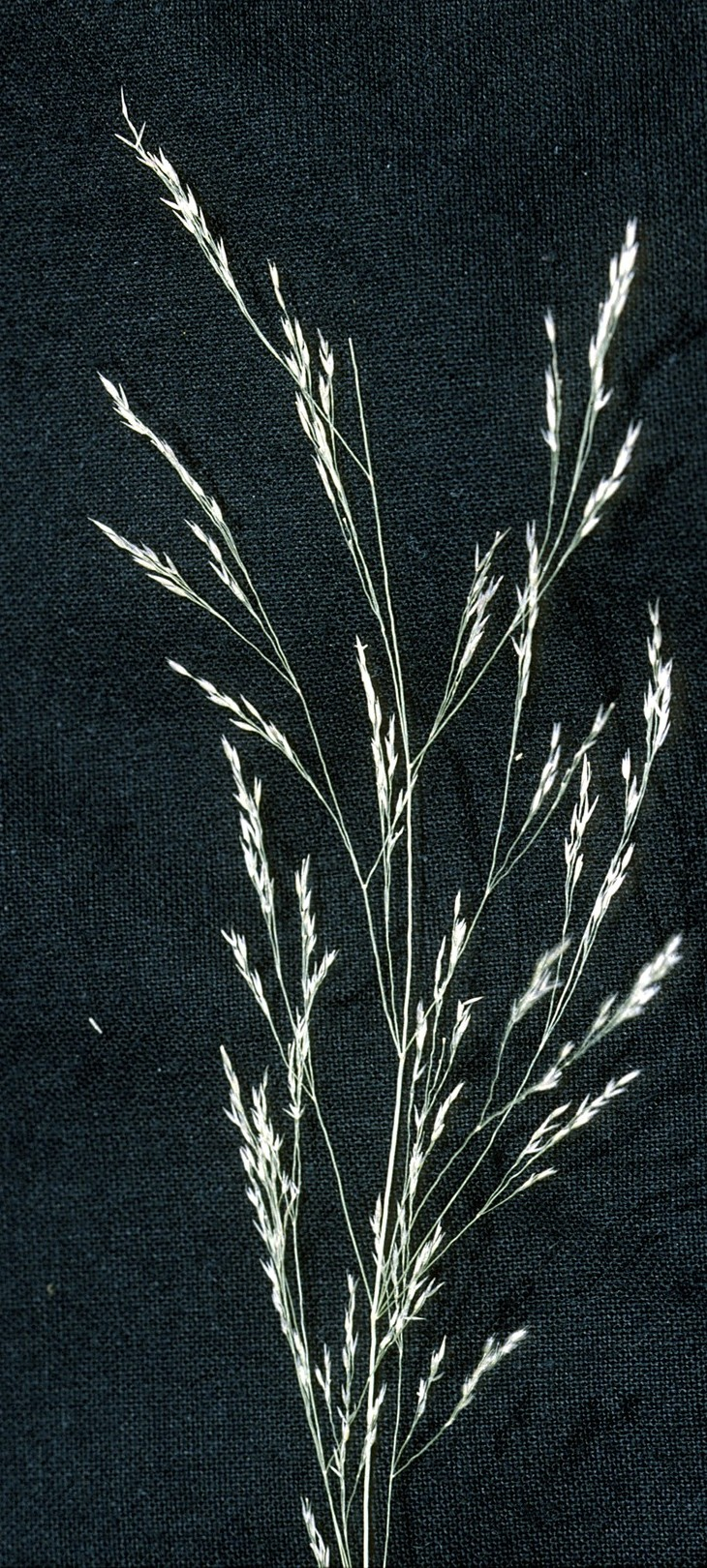

Conservation status
- Least Concern (IUCN 3.1)

Scientific classification
- Kingdom: Plantae
- Clade: Tracheophytes
- Clade: Angiosperms
- Clade: Monocots
- Clade: Commelinids
- Order: Poales
- Family: Poaceae
- Subfamily: Pooideae
- Genus: Agrostis
- Species: A. perennans

Binomial name
- Agrostis perennans (Walter) Tuck.

Synonyms
- List: Agrostis altissima (Walter) Tuck.; Agrostis anomala Willd., nom. superfl.; Agrostis campyla Tuck.; Agrostis canina subsp. grandiflora Hack., nom. illeg.; Agrostis chinantlae E.Fourn.; Agrostis cornucopiae Sm., nom. superfl.; Agrostis decumbens (Michx.) Link, nom. illeg.; Agrostis elata (Pursh) Trin.; Agrostis elegans Salisb., nom. superfl.; Agrostis exarata var. angustifolia Hack.; Agrostis fasciculata (Kunth) Roem. & Schult.; Agrostis flavidula Steud.; Agrostis humboldtiana Steud.; Agrostis hyemalis var. elata (Pursh) Fernald; Agrostis hyemalis var. oreophila (Trin.) Farw.; Agrostis intermedia Scribn., nom. illeg.; Agrostis kufuim Speg.; Agrostis michauxii Trin., nom. illeg.; Agrostis novae-angliae Tuck.; Agrostis noveboracensis Spreng.; Agrostis oreophila Trin.; Agrostis perennans var. aestivalis Vasey; Agrostis perennans var. elata (Pursh) Hitchc.; Agrostis perennans var. humilis Farw.; Agrostis pseudointermedia Farw.; Agrostis pulchella Kunth, nom. illeg.; Agrostis scabra Tuck., nom. illeg.; Agrostis scabra var. perennans (Walter) Alph.Wood; Agrostis schaffneri E.Fourn.; Agrostis schiedeana Trin.; Agrostis schweinitzii Trin.; Agrostis scribneriana Nash, nom. superfl.; Agrostis tacubayensis E.Fourn.; Agrostis tenuifolia var. fretensis Hook.f.; Agrostis violacea Phil., nom. illeg.; Agrostis weberbaueri Mez; Cornucopiae perennans Walter; Trichodium perennans (Walter) Elliott

= Agrostis perennans =

Species of grass

Agrostis perennans, the upland bentgrass, upland bent, or autumn bent, is a species of flowering plant in the grass family, Poaceae.

== Description ==
This perennial bunchgrass grows in clumps without rhizomes or stolons, with erect stems growing to about 8-31 inches (20–80 cm). The species name perennans means "perennial".

== Distribution ==
Agrostis perennans, upland bentgrass, is native to North and South America; it grows in fields, fens, open woods, thickets, and along roadsides.
