= Agrostis subspicata =

Scientific classification
- Kingdom: Plantae
- Clade: Tracheophytes
- Clade: Angiosperms
- Clade: Monocots
- Clade: Commelinids
- Order: Poales
- Family: Poaceae
- Subfamily: Pooideae
- Genus: Agrostis
- Species: A. subspicata

Binomial name
- Agrostis subspicata (Willd.) Raspail

Synonyms
- List: Agrostis articulata Brot.; Agrostis articulata Poir., nom. illeg.; Agrostis linkii Banfi, Galasso & Bartolucci; Agrostis linkii subsp. prostrata (Hack. & Lange) Banfi, Galasso & Bartolucci; Agrostis longiseta Steud., pro syn.; Agrostis triflora Steud., not validly publ.; Alopecurus fasciculatus (Link) Poir.; Chaetopogon fasciculatus (Link) Hayek; Chaetopogon fasciculatus subsp. prostratus (Hack. & Lange) Laínz; Chaeturus divaricatus DC.; Chaeturus fasciculatus Link; Chaeturus fasciculatus subsp. prostratus (Hack. & Lange) Paunero; Chaeturus prostratus Hack. & Lange; Chaeturus spicatus Schrad., pro syn.; Muhlenbergia divaricata DC., pro syn.; Polypogon fasciculatus (Link) Pers.; Polypogon subspicatus Willd.; Vilfa articulata P.Beauv.

Genus of grasses

Agrostis subspicata, synonym Chaetopogon fasciculatus, is a species of European and North African plants in the grass family. It is native to Italy, Portugal, Spain, former Yugoslavia, and Morocco.
