= Agrostis mannii =

Conservation status
- Near Threatened (IUCN 2.3)

Scientific classification
- Kingdom: Plantae
- Clade: Tracheophytes
- Clade: Angiosperms
- Clade: Monocots
- Clade: Commelinids
- Order: Poales
- Family: Poaceae
- Subfamily: Pooideae
- Genus: Agrostis
- Species: A. mannii

Binomial name
- Agrostis mannii (Hook.f.) Stapf

Species of grass

Agrostis mannii is a species of grass in the family Poaceae. It is found in Cameroon and Equatorial Guinea. Its natural habitat is subtropical or tropical dry lowland grassland.
