= Agrostis media =

Conservation status
- Least Concern (IUCN 3.1)

Scientific classification
- Kingdom: Plantae
- Clade: Tracheophytes
- Clade: Angiosperms
- Clade: Monocots
- Clade: Commelinids
- Order: Poales
- Family: Poaceae
- Subfamily: Pooideae
- Genus: Agrostis
- Species: A. media

Binomial name
- Agrostis media Carmich.

Species of grass

Agrostis media is a species of grass in the family Poaceae. It is found only in Tristan da Cunha. Its natural habitats are subantarctic shrubland, subantarctic grassland, rocky areas, and rocky shores.
