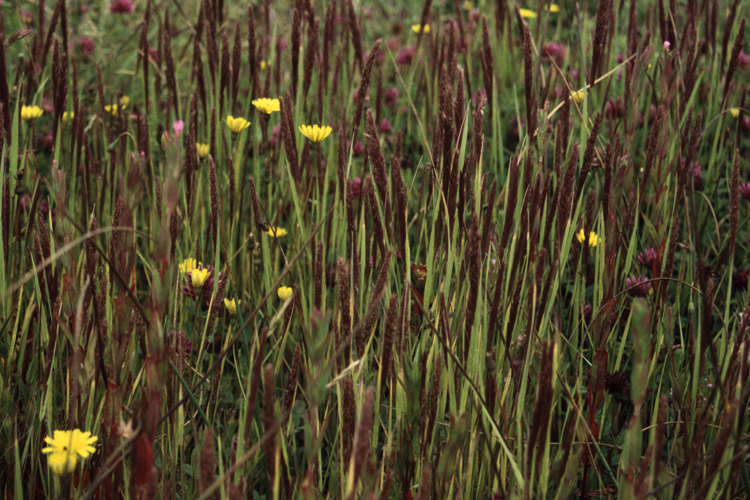

Scientific classification
- Kingdom: Plantae
- Clade: Tracheophytes
- Clade: Angiosperms
- Clade: Monocots
- Clade: Commelinids
- Order: Poales
- Family: Poaceae
- Subfamily: Pooideae
- Genus: Agrostis
- Species: A. microphylla

Binomial name
- Agrostis microphylla Steud.

Synonyms
- Agrostis aristiglumis

= Agrostis microphylla =

Species of flowering plant

Agrostis microphylla is a species of grass known by the common name small-leaf bentgrass. It is native to western North America from the Aleutian Islands to Baja California in Mexico, where it grows along coastal cliffs, on serpentine mountain slopes, and in vernal pools.

== Description ==
This is a winter-flowering annual bunchgrass approaching half a meter in maximum height. The inflorescence is a dense cylindrical panicle up to 12 centimeters long. The spikelets are yellowish, greenish, or purplish, and very narrow and pointed.

== Distribution ==
Agrostis microphylla is native to western North America: the Aleutian Islands, British Columbia, Oregon, Washington, California and Baja California in northwestern Mexico.
