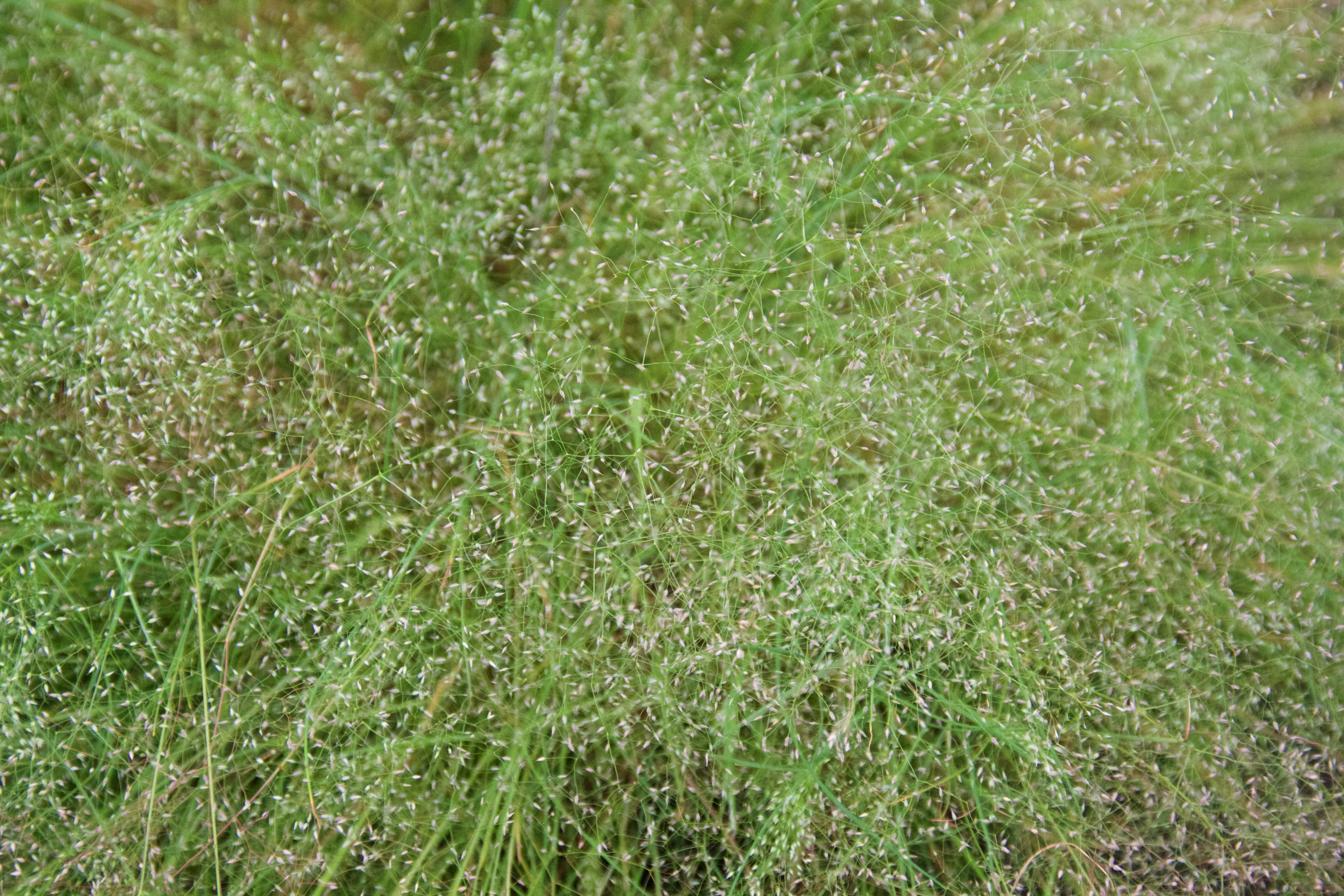

Scientific classification
- Kingdom: Plantae
- Clade: Embryophytes
- Clade: Tracheophytes
- Clade: Angiosperms
- Clade: Monocots
- Clade: Commelinids
- Order: Poales
- Family: Poaceae
- Subfamily: Pooideae
- Genus: Agrostis
- Species: A. nebulosa

Binomial name
- Agrostis nebulosa Boiss. & Reut.

Synonyms
- Neoschischkinia nebulosa (Boiss. & Reut.) Tzvelev

= Agrostis nebulosa =

Cloud grass

Species of flowering plant

Agrostis nebulosa is a species of flowering plant in the family Poaceae. It is referred to by the common name cloud grass, and is an ornamental plant native to Morocco, Portugal and Spain. This plant is often cultivated for its light delicate heads that are used dried in floristry.

A. nebulosa has been once collected as a naturalised plant in New Zealand, wild on the grounds of Massey University, Palmerston North, in 1961.
