= Agrostis pallescens =

Conservation status
- Naturally Uncommon (NZ TCS)

Scientific classification
- Kingdom: Plantae
- Clade: Tracheophytes
- Clade: Angiosperms
- Clade: Monocots
- Clade: Commelinids
- Order: Poales
- Family: Poaceae
- Subfamily: Pooideae
- Genus: Agrostis
- Species: A. pallescens

Binomial name
- Agrostis pallescens Cheeseman

Synonyms
- Agrostis muelleri var. paludosa Hack.

Species of plant

Agrostis pallescens is a grass endemic to New Zealand, which was described by Thomas Cheeseman in 1921.

== Description ==
Agrostis pallescens grows in small 3-5 cm with fine leaves and narrowly branched, delicate panicles that scarcely overtop the leaves. Branching is extravaginal at the base of the plant, and intravaginal above. The leaf-blade is 0.2-0.4 mm wide, folded. The panicle is 0.6-2-(3) cm long, open, and sparsely branched. Spikelets are 1.5-2 mm, with glumes ± equal to the awnless lemmas.

Like all Agrostis native to Aotearoa/New Zealand, the palea is around 1/3rd of the length of the lemma, compared to 1/2-2/3rds in introduced species. Its open panicle rules out many indigenous species, and from all other species with an open, spreading panicle, it is differentiated by its smaller stature, panicles, and spikelets, and lemmas that are more-or-less equal to the glumes.

== Distribution ==
Agrostis pallescens is endemic to New Zealand. In the North Island it is found only in the central mountains. In the South Island it is found from Nelson along Main Divide to Fiordland, and rare in the east. It is also found on Stewart Island/Rakiura.

The type location is the Tasman Valley, at Rakiura/Mount Cook, collected by Hackel in 1897.

== Habitat ==
Agrostis pallescens is a montane to alpine species that is occasionally present in lowlands in the southern part of its range. It is normally a wetland species, found in cushion or peat bogs.

== Threats ==
Agrostis pallescens was deemed At Risk-Naturally Uncommon in 2023 under the New Zealand Threat Classification System. However, data is poor for trends, population size, and range.

Agrostis pallescens is also designated At Risk-Naturally Uncommon in Otago.

== Taxonomy ==
Agrostis pallescens has been referred to by the same name since its description in 1921, and has no synonyms.

=== Etymology ===
Agrostis - from the Greek agrostis (a forage plant, a kind of grass), cf. agros (a field).

pallescens - pale.
