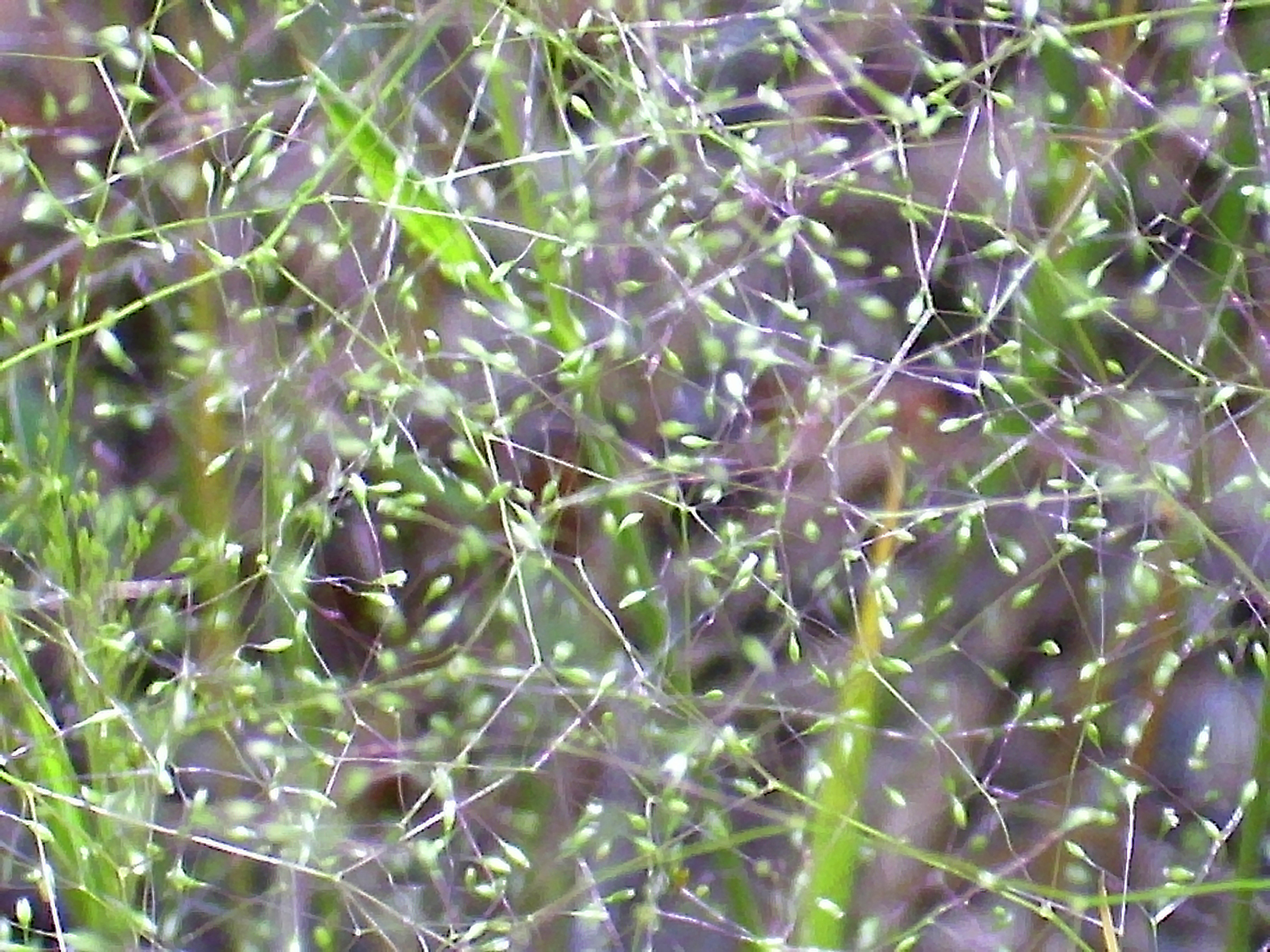
- Agrostula truncatula subsp. truncatula

Scientific classification
- Kingdom: Plantae
- Clade: Tracheophytes
- Clade: Angiosperms
- Clade: Monocots
- Clade: Commelinids
- Order: Poales
- Family: Poaceae
- Subfamily: Pooideae
- Tribe: Poeae
- Subtribe: Agrostidinae
- Genus: Agrostula; P.M.Peterson, Romasch., Soreng & Sylvester
- Species: A. truncatula

Binomial name
- Agrostula truncatula (Parl.) P.M.Peterson, Romasch., Soreng & Sylvester

Subspecies
- Agrostula truncatula subsp. durieui (Boiss. & Reut. ex Willk.) P.M.Peterson, Romasch., Soreng & Sylvester; Agrostula truncatula subsp. truncatula

Synonyms
- Agrostis truncatula Parl.; Agrostis truncatula var. leiolemma Maire; Neoschischkinia truncatula (Parl.) Valdés & H.Scholz

= Agrostula =

Genus of grasses

Agrostula is a genus of grasses. It includes a single species, Agrostula truncatula, which is native to the Pyrenees of France and Spain, Portugal, and Morocco.

It includes two subspecies:

- Agrostula truncatula subsp. durieui (Boiss. & Reut. ex Willk.) P.M.Peterson, Romasch., Soreng & Sylvester – western Pyrenees and northern Portugal
- Agrostula truncatula subsp. truncatula – Pyrenees to east-central Portugal and Morocco

The species was first described as Agrostis truncatula by Filippo Parlatore in 1850. In 2020 Paul M. Peterson et al. renamed it the sole species in the new genus Agrostula based on phylogenetic and morphological evidence. Agrostula is distinguished from Agrostis by leaf blades with continuous pillars of sclerenchyma between the adaxial and abaxial blade surfaces, dorsally-rounded glumes with blunt to truncate and erose to denticulate apices, florets half the length of the glumes, lemmas equal in width and length and widest at or near the apex, broadly truncate apices, awnless anthers irregularly 5 to 7 denticulate to erose and longer than the lemmas, and rugose-papillose caryopses.
