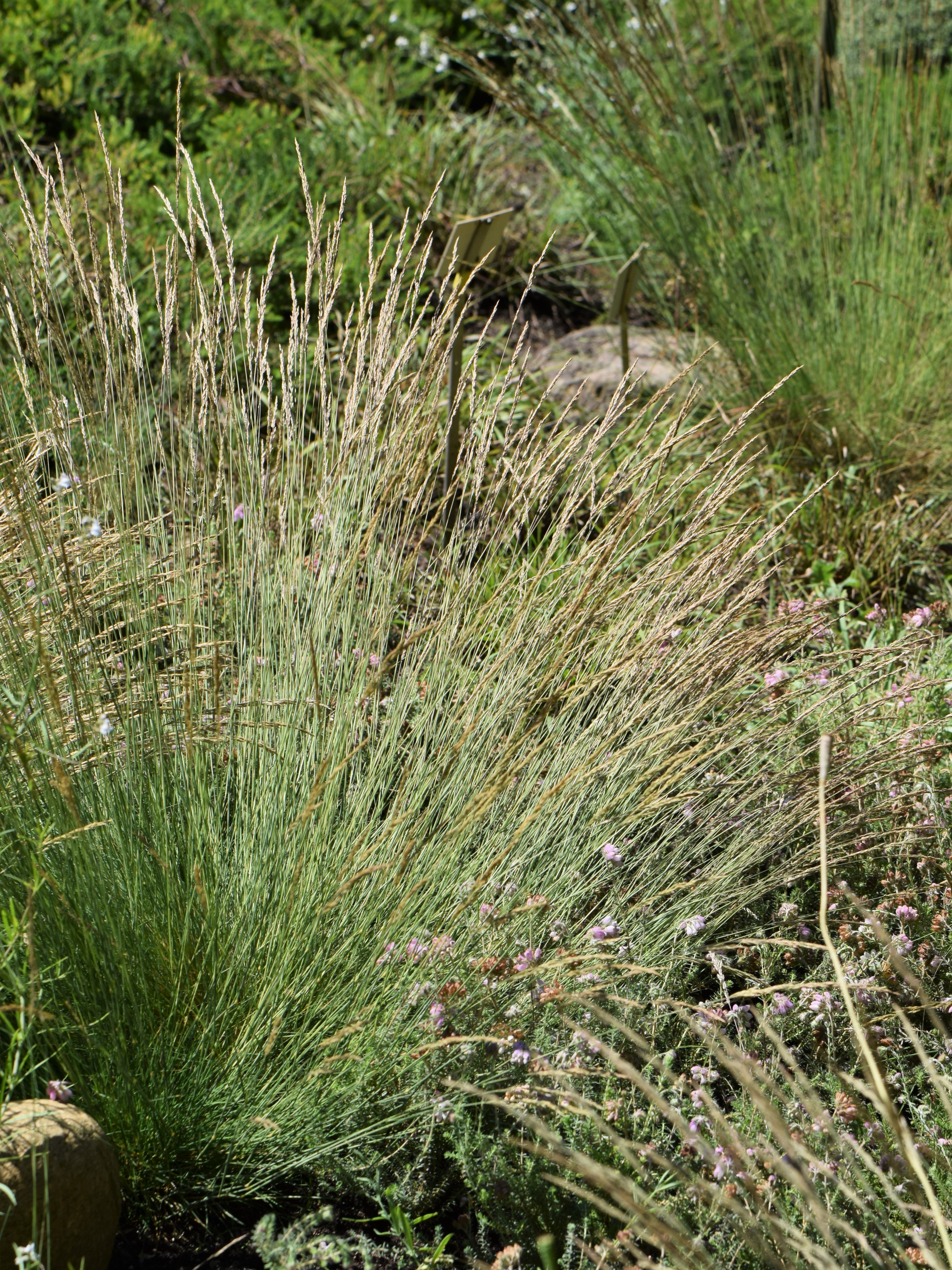
- Alpagrostis setacea

Scientific classification
- Kingdom: Plantae
- Clade: Tracheophytes
- Clade: Angiosperms
- Clade: Monocots
- Clade: Commelinids
- Order: Poales
- Family: Poaceae
- Subfamily: Pooideae
- Tribe: Poeae
- Subtribe: Agrostidinae
- Genus: Alpagrostis; P.M.Peterson, Romasch., Soreng & Sylvester

= Alpagrostis =

Genus of grasses

Alpagrostis is a genus of grasses. It includes four species native to Europe, ranging from Portugal and Great Britain to Ukraine, and to Morocco.

== Species ==
Four species are accepted.

- Alpagrostis alpina (Scop.) P.M.Peterson, Romasch., Soreng & Sylvester – Alps, Apennines, Carpathians, and Pyrenees
- Alpagrostis barceloi (L.Sáez & Rosselló) P.M.Peterson, Romasch., Soreng & Sylvester – Balearic Islands
- Alpagrostis schleicheri (Jord. & Verl.) P.M.Peterson, Romasch., Soreng & Sylvester – mountains of west-central and southwestern Europe and Morocco
- Alpagrostis setacea (Poir.) P.M.Peterson, Romasch., Soreng & Sylvester – southwestern Great Britain, France, Spain, Portugal, and Morocco
