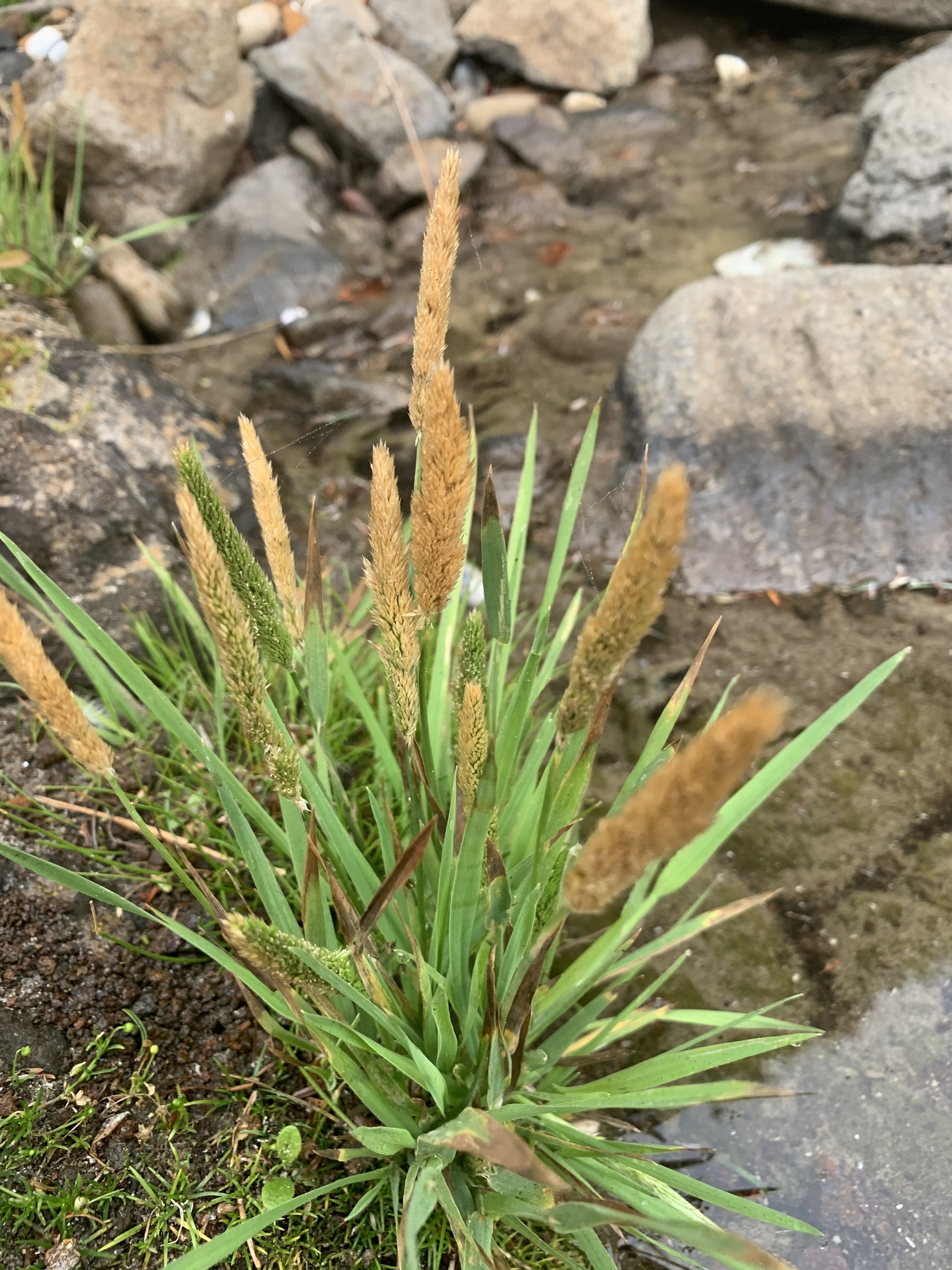

Conservation status
- Vulnerable (NatureServe)

Scientific classification
- Kingdom: Plantae
- Clade: Tracheophytes
- Clade: Angiosperms
- Clade: Monocots
- Clade: Commelinids
- Order: Poales
- Family: Poaceae
- Subfamily: Pooideae
- Genus: Agrostis
- Species: A. densiflora

Binomial name
- Agrostis densiflora Vasey

Synonyms
- Agrostis californica

= Agrostis densiflora =

Species of flowering plant

Agrostis densiflora is a species of grass known by the common name California bent grass. It is endemic to the coast of northern and central California, United States, where it grows in habitat along the immediate coastline, such as dunes and bluffs.

== Description ==
It is a perennial grass growing in tufts between 10 and 85 cm (3.9 and 33.5 in) tall. The small inflorescence is a few centimeters long and is a dense, cylindrical array of tiny spikelets, each up to about 3 mm (0.12 in) in length.
