= Wirestem muhly =

Wirestem muhly is a common name for two closely related plants and may refer to:

- Muhlenbergia frondosa
- Muhlenbergia mexicana, native to the United States and Canada
