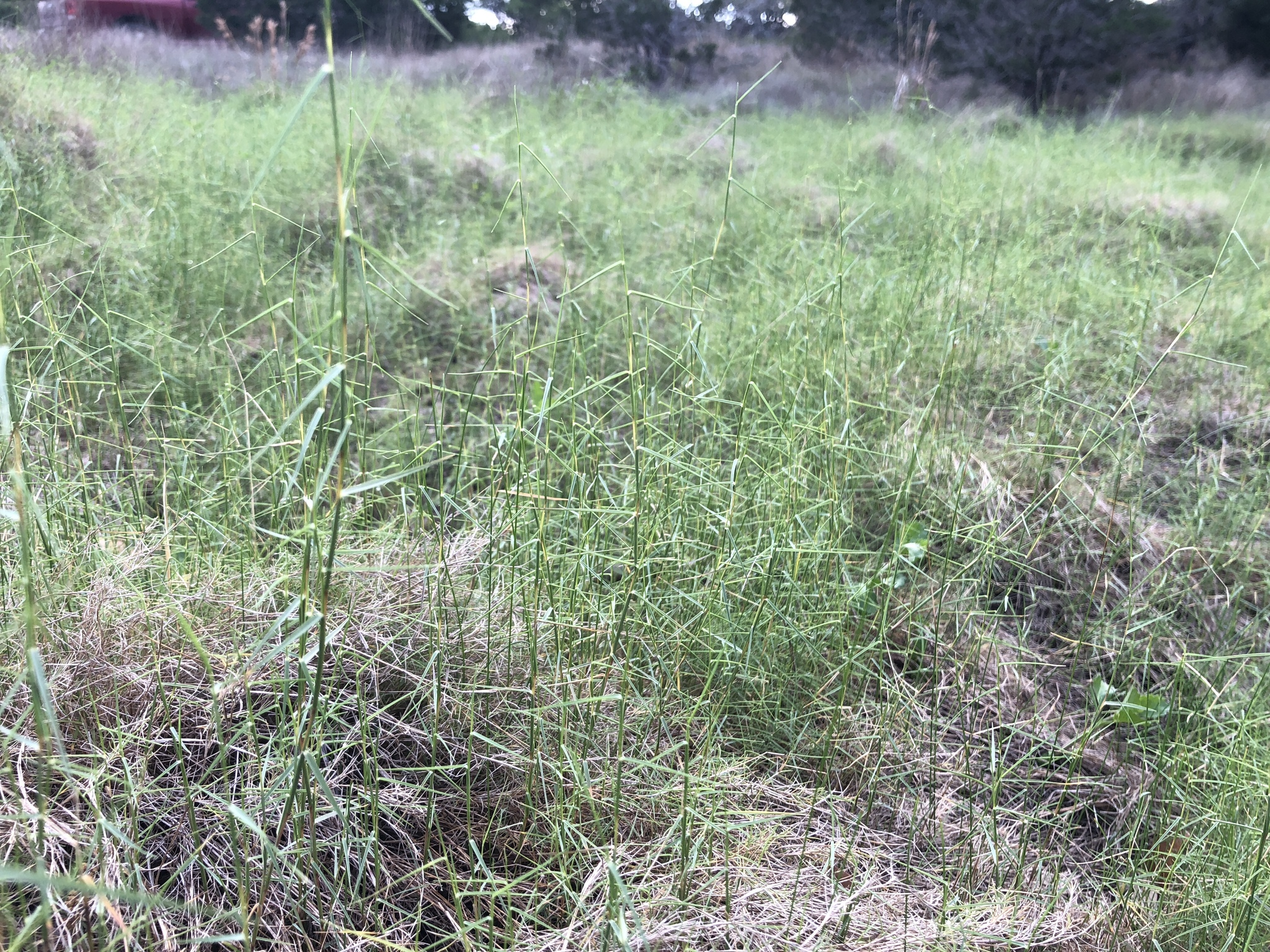

Conservation status
- Apparently Secure (NatureServe)

Scientific classification
- Kingdom: Plantae
- Clade: Tracheophytes
- Clade: Angiosperms
- Clade: Monocots
- Clade: Commelinids
- Order: Poales
- Family: Poaceae
- Subfamily: Chloridoideae
- Genus: Muhlenbergia
- Species: M. utilis

Binomial name
- Muhlenbergia utilis (Torr.) Hitchc.

= Muhlenbergia utilis =

Species of flowering plant

Muhlenbergia utilis is a North American species of grass known by the common name aparejo grass.

== Distribution ==
It is native to North and Central America, where it can be found throughout the south-western United States and California, through Mexico, as far south as Costa Rica. It grows in wet habitats, including riverbanks and meadows, sometimes in alkaline soils.

== Description ==
Muhlenbergia utilis is a rhizomatous perennial grass producing decumbent stems up to about 30 centimeters long. The leaves are no more than 3 to 5 centimeters long and just a few millimeters wide. The inflorescence is a small, narrow, partially sheathed series of short branches bearing small spikelets.
