= Muhlenbergia capillaris =

- Muhlenbergia capillaris in full bloom

Conservation status
- Secure (NatureServe)

Scientific classification
- Kingdom: Plantae
- Clade: Tracheophytes
- Clade: Angiosperms
- Clade: Monocots
- Clade: Commelinids
- Order: Poales
- Family: Poaceae
- Subfamily: Chloridoideae
- Genus: Muhlenbergia
- Species: M. capillaris

Binomial name
- Muhlenbergia capillaris (Lam.) Trin.

Synonyms
- Agrostis setosa Willd. ex Trin., pro syn.; Muhlenbergia polypogon (DC.) Trin.; Muhlenbergia trichodes Steud.; Podosemum agrostideum (P.Beauv.) P.Beauv.; Podosemum capillare (Lam.) Desv.; Stipa capillaris Lam.; Stipa diffusa Walter; Tosagris agrostidea P.Beauv.; Trichochloa capillaris (Lam.) DC.; Trichochloa polypogon DC.

Species of plant

Muhlenbergia capillaris, commonly known as the hairawn muhly, is a perennial North American sedge-like plant that grows to be about 30–90 cm (0.98–2.95 ft) tall and 60–90 cm (2.0–3.0 ft) wide. The plant includes a double layer; green, leaf-like structures surround the understory, and purple-pink flowers outgrow them from the bottom up. The plant is a warm-season grass, meaning that leaves begin growth in the summer. During the summer, the leaves stay green, but they morph during the fall to produce a more copper color. The seasonal changes also include the flowers, as they grow out during the fall and stay healthy till the end of autumn. The muhly grows along the border of roads and on plain prairies. The grass clumps into herds, causing bush-like establishments in the area the hairawn muhly inhabits. The flowers are very feathery and add a cloudlike appearance to the top of the grass. It is native to eastern North America and can be used for a multitude of purposes, including ornamental gardening and farming. It was voted 2012 plant of the year by the Garden Club of America.

== Description ==
Individuals of this species are grouped into shrubs of "capillary"-like branching pattern with green leaves covering the understory and pink flowers outgrowing them. The muhly grass is a cespitose perennial that grows to be 30–90 cm (0.98–2.95 ft) tall and 60–90 cm (2.0–3.0 ft) wide. The blades are rolled, flat to involute during maturity and are about 15–35 cm long and 1.3–3.5 mm wide at the base with tapering or filiform tips. The stems are erect or decumbent at the base of the shrub. The leaves are inflorescence and narrow with a contracted or open panicle of small spikelets, each spikelet being 1-flowered and rarely 2-flowered. The wiry, thin leaves are simple and alternating from the stem; they grow to be about 18–36 inches long. The flowers of the grass are grouped together, forming long, airy clusters along a stem that rises above the leaves to a length of about 18 inches (460 mm) and width of 10 inches (250 mm).

Flowers of M. capillaris are perfect with each having about two or three stamens and anthers that are about 1–1.8 mm long. Spikelets are found on the long, hair-like pedicels that are clavate-thickened at the apex and are slightly scabrous. The glumes are found to be unequal, and are either longer or shorter than the lemma. The lemma is obtuse to acuminate or awned, while the membranous lemma is narrow, acute, mucronate, or awned, and usually pilose at the base. The flowers grow during the fall season, especially from September to October, and are usually colored pink or purplish-red. They mature from the bottom up. The plant is a "warm-season" plant, so it starts growing during the summer and is in full bloom during the autumn. The seed stalks are 60–150 cm (2.0–4.9 ft) tall. The flowers produce oblong tan or brown seeds that are less than half an inch long. The plants grow in clumps, but do not spread through above-ground or underground stems.

== Taxonomy ==
Jean-Baptiste Lamarck described this species in 1791 as Stipa capillaris before it gained its current name from Carl Bernhard von Trinius in 1824.

== Distribution and habitat ==
Muhlenbergia capillaris can be found in sandy or rocky woods and clearings originating from a range of host states, which include Florida to east Texas, north to Massachusetts, New Jersey, eastern Pennsylvania, Kentucky, southern Indiana, Missouri, and Kansas. However, it is endangered in Connecticut, Indiana, Maryland, and New Jersey, and is said to have vanished from Pennsylvania and almost certainly Ohio. The muhly grows along the border of roads and in plain prairies. The grass clumps into herds, causing bush-like establishments in the area the hairawn muhly inhabits.

== Conservation status in the United States ==
It is listed as endangered in Connecticut, Indiana, Maryland, and New Jersey, as presumed extirpated in Ohio, and as extirpated in Pennsylvania.

== Usage ==
Muhlenbergia capillaris is a perennial plant that can live for an indeterminate time (based on maintenance). Muhly grass prefers a mildly acidic (pH range of 5.5 to 6.8), organic soil. Its advantages for cultivation include being disease resistant, tolerant of shade, and easy to maintain with annual pruning. Although tolerant of dry spells, it appreciates extra water in cultivation.

Its hardiness and drought-tolerant properties make it a useful native ornamental grass in land reclamation, and it also has potential as fine fuel for burn management programs to reduce understory.

It is a known attractant for beneficial insects such as ladybug beetles, and is an adequate garden plant because of its low maintenance and general beauty. The clumping habit makes it a standard for use as wildlife cover, such as nests and shelter for native birds.
