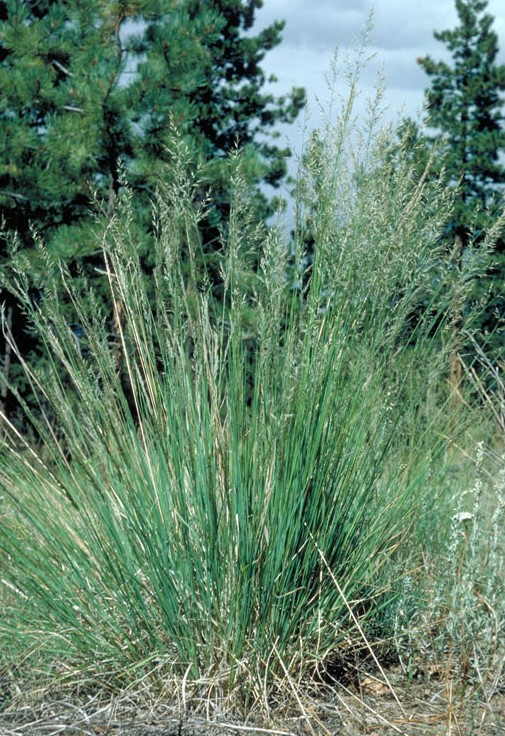

Conservation status
- Secure (NatureServe)

Scientific classification
- Kingdom: Plantae
- Clade: Tracheophytes
- Clade: Angiosperms
- Clade: Monocots
- Clade: Commelinids
- Order: Poales
- Family: Poaceae
- Subfamily: Chloridoideae
- Genus: Muhlenbergia
- Species: M. montana

Binomial name
- Muhlenbergia montana (Nutt.) Hitchc.

= Muhlenbergia montana =

Species of flowering plant

Muhlenbergia montana, the mountain muhly, is a species of grass. It is native to North and Central America, where it is found throughout the Western United States, the Sierra Nevada, Mexico, and Guatemala.

It can be found in several types of habitat, including grassland, rocky outcrops, mountains, and open areas.

== Description ==
Muhlenbergia montana is a perennial bunchgrass forming tufts of stems 10 to 40 centimeters tall. The inflorescence is an open array of spreading or upright branches bearing small, awned spikelets.

== Etymology ==
The Latin specific epithet montana refers to mountains or coming from mountains.
