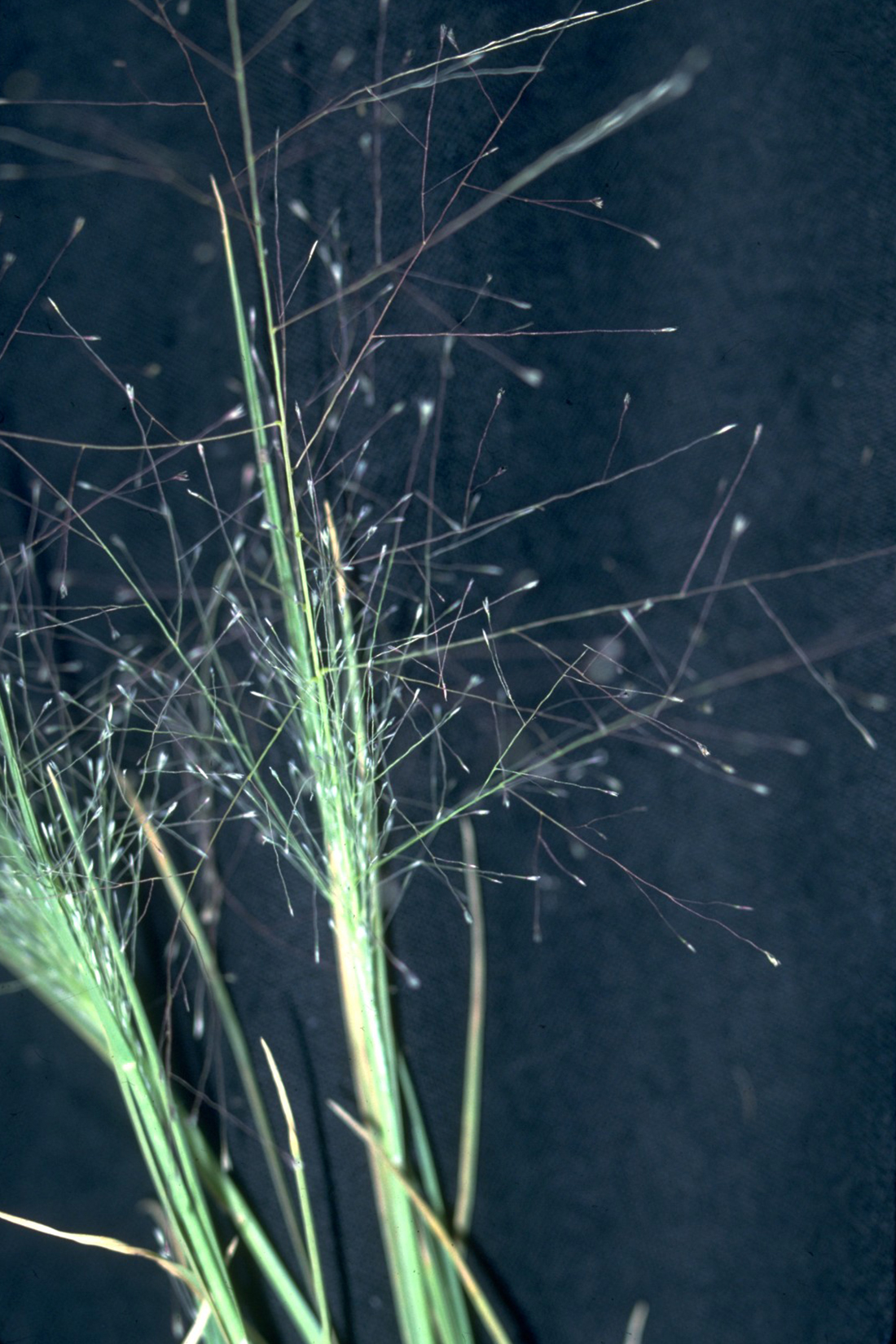

Conservation status
- Secure (NatureServe)

Scientific classification
- Kingdom: Plantae
- Clade: Tracheophytes
- Clade: Angiosperms
- Clade: Monocots
- Clade: Commelinids
- Order: Poales
- Family: Poaceae
- Subfamily: Chloridoideae
- Genus: Muhlenbergia
- Species: M. asperifolia

Binomial name
- Muhlenbergia asperifolia (Nees & Meyen ex Trin.) Parodi

= Muhlenbergia asperifolia =

Species of grass

Muhlenbergia asperifolia is a species of grass known as alkali muhly and scratchgrass. It is native to much of North America, including most of southern Canada, most of the continental United States except for the southeastern region, and parts of northern Mexico. It also grows in South America.

== Description ==
Muhlenbergia asperifolia is a rhizomatous perennial grass growing decumbent or spreading or erect up to about 60 cm (2 ft) tall. The inflorescence is a very open, wispy array of many hair-thin, outstretched branches each up to 14 cm (5.5 in) long. The spikelets at the tips of the branches are only 1–2 mm (0.039–0.079 in) long.

== Cultivation ==
Muhlenbergia asperifolia is a valuable grass for habitat restoration and revegetation projects in disturbed habitat in the southwest United States, especially in riparian zones in California and the Intermountain West. It is planted with alkali sacaton (Sporobolus airoides) for Mojave River and other riparian zone restoration in the Mojave Desert. It produces a dense groundcover once established.
