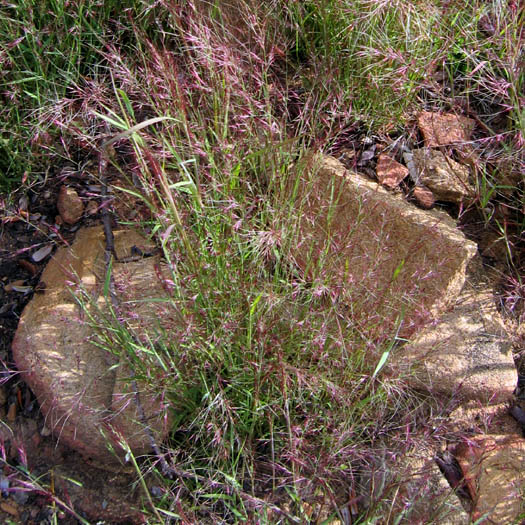

Conservation status
- Secure (NatureServe)

Scientific classification
- Kingdom: Plantae
- Clade: Tracheophytes
- Clade: Angiosperms
- Clade: Monocots
- Clade: Commelinids
- Order: Poales
- Family: Poaceae
- Subfamily: Chloridoideae
- Genus: Muhlenbergia
- Species: M. microsperma

Binomial name
- Muhlenbergia microsperma (DC.) Kunth

Synonyms
- Basionym: Trichochloa microsperma DC. 1813; Heterotypic synonyms: Agrostis debilis (Kunth) Spreng.; Agrostis microcarpa Steud.; Agrostis microsperma Lag.; Agrostis setosa (Kunth) Spreng.; Muhlenbergia debilis (Kunth) Kunth; Muhlenbergia fasciculata Trin.; Muhlenbergia purpurea Nutt.; Muhlenbergia ramosissima Vasey; Muhlenbergia setosa (Kunth) Kunth; Podosemum debile Kunth; Podosemum setosum Kunth; Trichochloa debilis (Kunth) Roem. & Schult.; Trichochloa setosa (Kunth) Roem. & Schult.

= Muhlenbergia microsperma =

Species of plant

Muhlenbergia microsperma is a species of grass known by the common name littleseed muhly. An annual or short-lived perennial tufted grass with a purplish inflorescence, it is native to the Americas from the Southwestern United States through Central America to northern South America. It is usually found in many habitats, particularly open areas, cliffs and slopes, and disturbed sites. It is characterized by the presence of closed, self-pollinating flowers on its lower stems and small spikelets.

== Description ==
Muhlenbergia microsperma is an annual or perennial tufted grass with culms growing up to 10–80 cm (3.9–31.5 in) tall. The leaf blades are 2–6 cm (0.79–2.36 in) long by 1–2.5 mm (0.039–0.098 in) wide. The leaf sheathes are often shorter than the internodes and are glabrous, with a smooth or minutely scabrous texture. The ligules are 1–2 mm (0.039–0.079 in) long, decurrent to the sheath, with a truncate to obtuse toothed tip. The inflorescence is a purplish panicle 6.5–13.5 mm (0.26–0.53 in) long by 1–6.5 mm (0.039–0.256 in) wide, with spreading or ascending branches. Characteristic of this species are panicles of 1 to 3 cleistogamous florets present in the axils of the lower leaves on the stems. The spikelet consists of lemmas usually 2.5–3.8 mm (0.098–0.150 in) long, and glumes 0.4–1.3 mm (0.016–0.051 in) long.

This species has a marked morphological diversity among and within its populations. It has a varying chromosome count of 2n= 20, 40, 60.

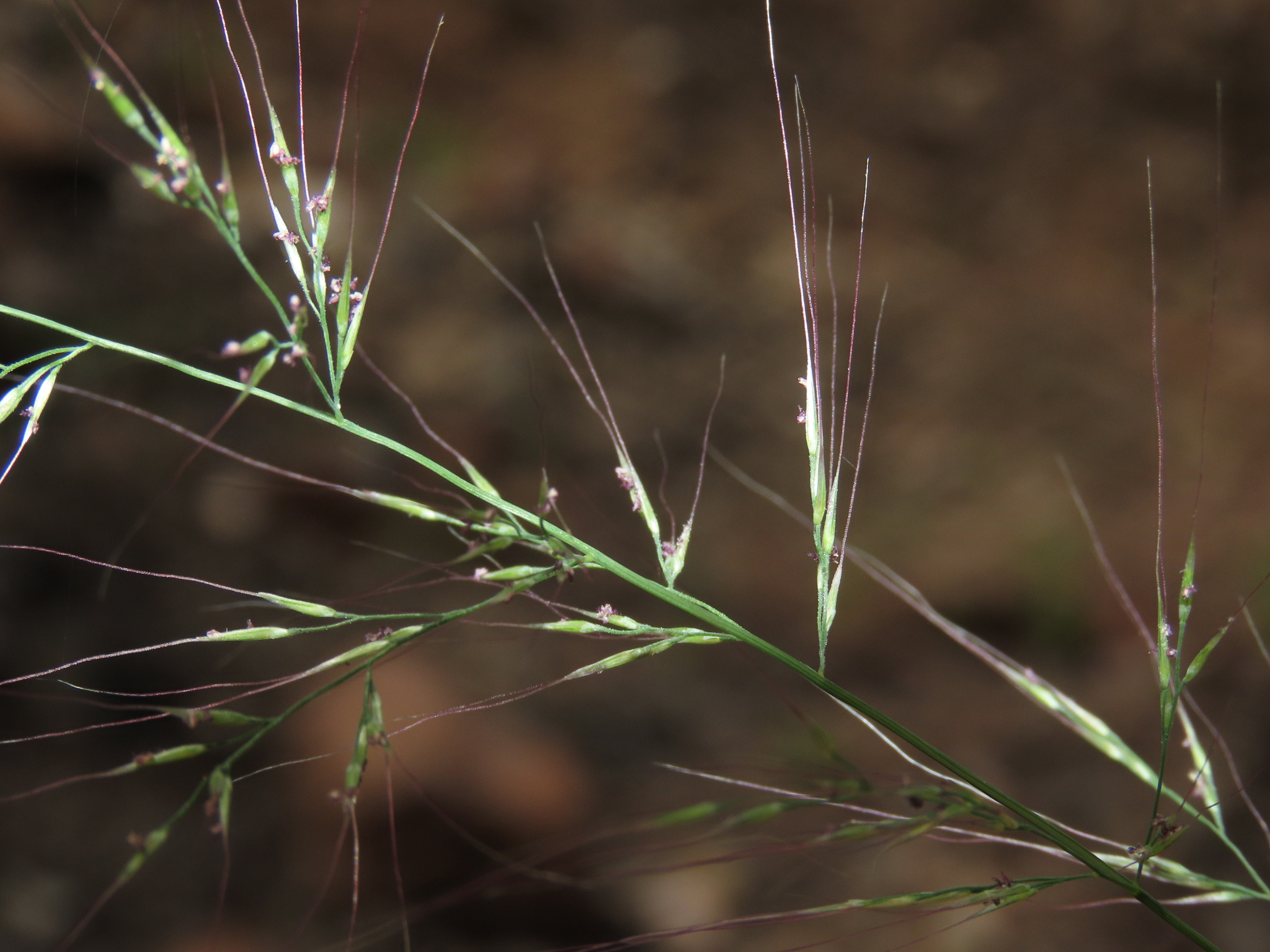
Detail of the inflorescence

== Distribution and habitat ==
Muhlenbergia microsperma is native to the Americas. It is found in the United States in the states of Arizona, California, Nevada, and Utah. The species is widespread in Mexico, native to the states of Aguascalientes, Baja California, Baja California Sur, Chiapas, Coahuila, Mexico City, Durango, Guanajuato, Hidalgo, Jalisco, Mexico, Michoacán, Morelos, Nayarit, Nuevo León, Oaxaca, Puebla, Queretaro, San Luis Potosí, Sinaloa, Sonora, Tamaulipas, Tlaxcala, Veracruz, and Zacatecas. It is also native to Guatemala. In South America, this species can be found in Bolivia, Colombia, Ecuador, Peru, and Venezuela.

This species occupies a wide variety of habitats. It generally prefers open areas and more or less disturbed sites like roadsides, but can also be found in drainages, sandy slopes, cliffs, and rock outcrops. In North America, it usually grows in creosote scrub, thorn-scrub forest, sarcocaulescent desert, and oak-pinyon woodland associations, at elevations of 0–2,400 m (0–7,874 ft). It is also found in chaparral and coastal sage scrub habitats.
