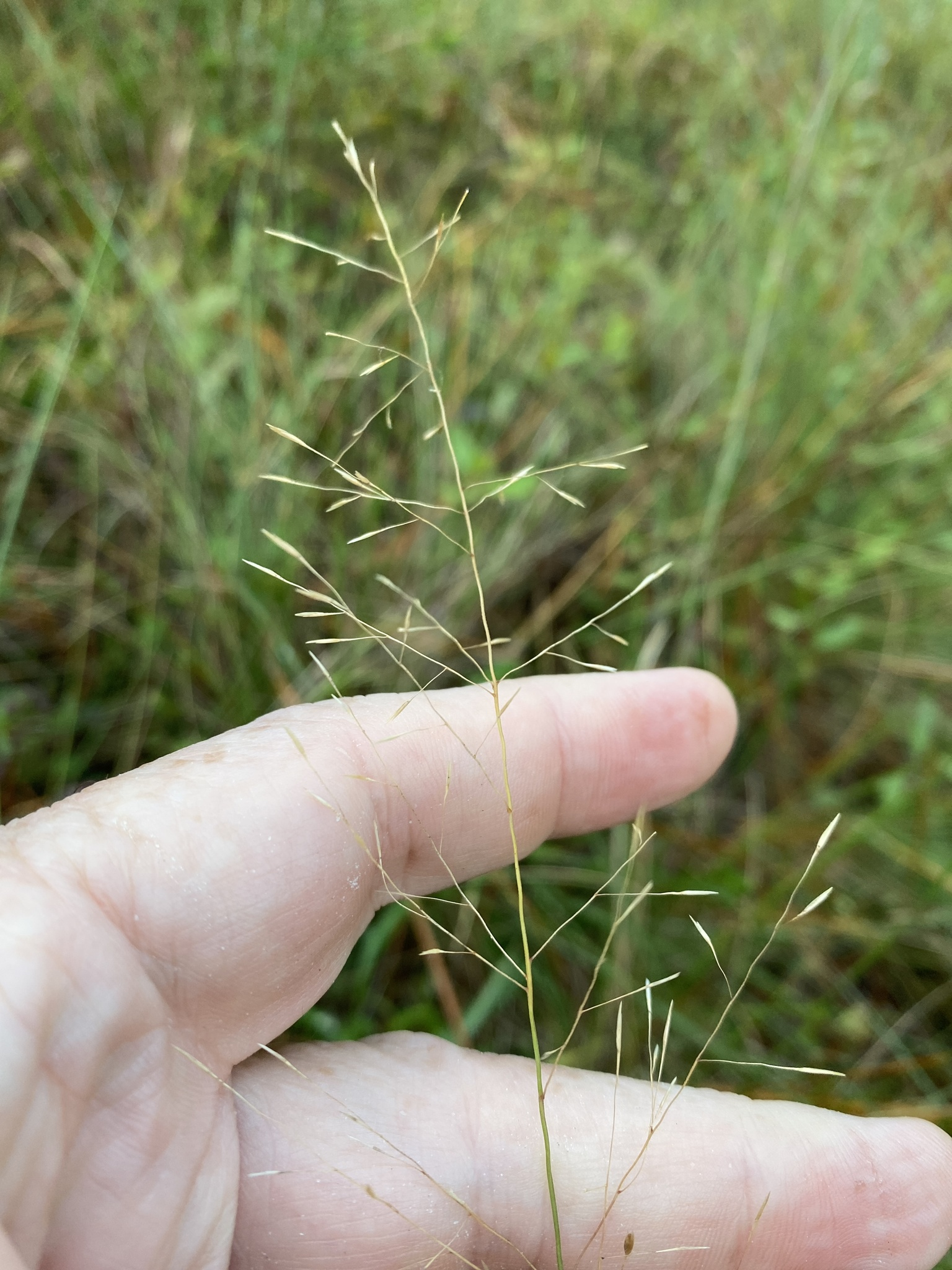

Conservation status
- Secure (NatureServe)

Scientific classification
- Kingdom: Plantae
- Clade: Tracheophytes
- Clade: Angiosperms
- Clade: Monocots
- Clade: Commelinids
- Order: Poales
- Family: Poaceae
- Subfamily: Chloridoideae
- Genus: Muhlenbergia
- Species: M. expansa

Binomial name
- Muhlenbergia expansa (Poir.) Trin.

= Muhlenbergia expansa =

Species of grass

Muhlenbergia expansa, also known as cutover muhly, is a North American species of plant in the grass family native to the Southeastern coast of the United States.

== Ecology ==
It is found in bogs, flatwoods, and other wet sites with acidic sandy soil, including the canebrake habitat. It can be grazed by herbivores such as cattle and sheep, and can be growth-controlled by fire.
