= Elachista brachyelythrifoliella =

Scientific classification
- Kingdom: Animalia
- Phylum: Arthropoda
- Clade: Pancrustacea
- Class: Insecta
- Order: Lepidoptera
- Family: Elachistidae
- Genus: Elachista
- Species: E. brachyelythrifoliella

Binomial name
- Elachista brachyelythrifoliella Clemens, 1864

Synonyms
- Dicranoctetes brachyelytrifoliella; Elachista brachyelythrifoliella

Species of moth

Elachista brachyelythrifoliella is a moth of the family Elachistidae. It is found in the United States, where it has been recorded from Alabama, California, Florida, Indiana, Kentucky, Mississippi, Ohio, Pennsylvania, Virginia and Washington.

The wingspan is 5.5–7.5 mm. The hindwings are dark brownish gray. Adults have been recorded on wing nearly year round.

The larvae feed on Brachyelytrum aristatum and Muhlenbergia species. They mine the leaves of their host plant. Mining larvae can be found from early July to October. Pupation takes place in a crevice beneath two layers of silk.
