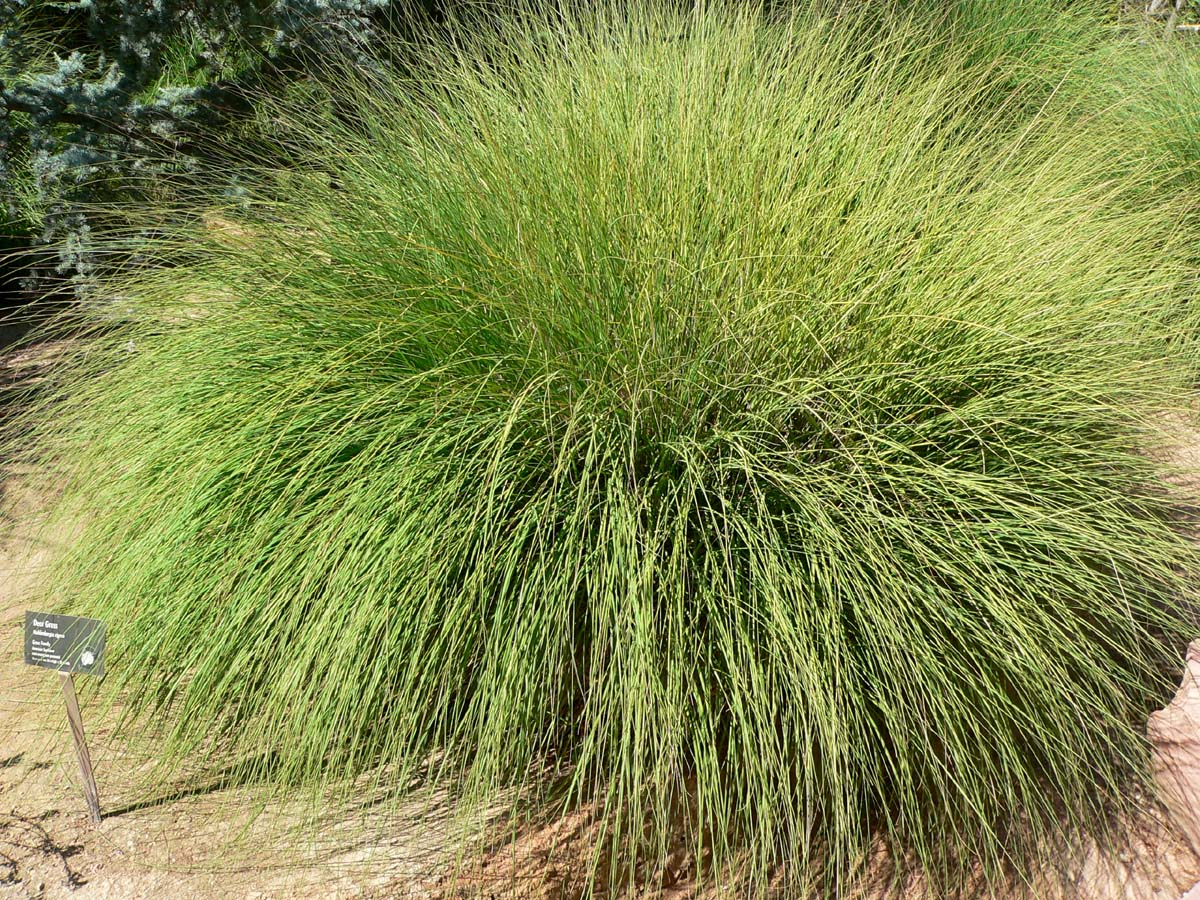

Conservation status
- Secure (NatureServe)

Scientific classification
- Kingdom: Plantae
- Clade: Tracheophytes
- Clade: Angiosperms
- Clade: Monocots
- Clade: Commelinids
- Order: Poales
- Family: Poaceae
- Subfamily: Chloridoideae
- Genus: Muhlenbergia
- Species: M. rigens

Binomial name
- Muhlenbergia rigens (Benth.) Hitchc.

= Muhlenbergia rigens =

Species of plant

Muhlenbergia rigens, commonly known as deergrass, is a North American warm season perennial bunchgrass. It is found in sandy or well-drained soils below 7,000 feet (2,100 m) in elevation in the Southwestern United States and parts of Mexico.

== Description ==
Deergrass is characterized by dense, tufted basal foliage consisting of narrow pointed leaves that reach lengths of about 3 feet (0.91 m). The foliage ranges in color from light silver-green to purple. The spikelike stems are less than half an inch wide and 3–4 feet (0.91–1.22 m) in length. During bloom, the numerous flowered panicles often reach heights of five feet. The spikelets consist of a single awnless floret with a 3-nerved lemma.

== Distribution ==
The native range of the grass extends north into Shasta County, California, and south into New Mexico, Texas, and Mexico. There it inhabits a wide range of ecotypes including grassland, riparian, chaparral, mixed conifer, and oak woodland communities. Deergrass can grow in areas with periodic flooding, but cannot tolerate standing water and poorly drained soils. It prefers full sun but is shade-tolerant.

== Ecology ==
Muhlenbergia rigens is a cover for mule deer during fawning periods. Studies have equated reduced deer populations with overgrazed deergrass stands in and near cattle pasture. Young shoots and leaves are grazed by deer, horses, and cattle. It is an overwintering host for many species of Lepidoptera and ladybug. Deergrass seed provides food for many different bird species.

== Uses ==
The young shoots are browsed by a variety of animals, but with age the plant becomes unpalatable. As such, is useful in an exposed garden setting for its deer resistance. It has also been used for erosion prevention and streambank stabilization because of extensive root systems. Restoration efforts currently use deergrass to displace exotic invasive annuals that dominate some grassland ecosystems. Deergrass can also be used to remediate overtilled, eroded agricultural land where it anchors and returns lost organic matter to the soil. Phytoremediative studies have been conducted to test the ability of deergrass to remove chemicals from agricultural runoff. Its dense stands and extensive roots act as a biofilter effective for herbicide, pesticide, and particulate breakdown.

Among the Zuni people, the grass is attached to the sticks of plume offerings to anthropic gods.

== Cultivation and habitat restoration ==
Muhlenbergia rigens can be established in late spring and early summer by broadcast seeding with irrigation. For best results, 50 seeds per square foot are planted then lightly incorporated just below the soil surface with a culti-packer. Establishment is most successful when steps are taken to mitigate weed growth. Burning, discing, and reduced fertilization schemes to reduce the weed seed bank are recommended.

Container planting is a highly effective way of establishing deergrass. The seed can be sown in flats in May and transplanted in the fall of the same year. In California, except in areas of heavy frost, Muhlenbegia rigens can be successfully planted in winter and spring to take advantage of seasonal rainfall. Stand preparation should be the same as when broadcast-seeded. During transplant, plants should be spaced with a minimum of two feet between them. After establishment little management is required. Irrigation is unnecessary in normal rainfall years and fertilization is not recommended as it may increase weed competition. Burning or mowing can be used every few years to reduce accumulated dead matter.

Because Muhlenbergia rigens uses C_{4} carbon fixation, it gains an advantage in conditions of drought and high temperature. This characteristic, along with its attractiveness, has gained the plant recent attention as an ornamental in xeriscape gardens. Studies have also demonstrated a high tolerance to salt suggesting possible irrigation using low quality reclaimed waste-water sources at very low cost.

== History ==
Deergrass was important to many Native American tribes who used its long seedstalks as the principal material in coiled baskets. Deergrass underwent an early form of cultivation by many California tribes who regularly burned areas to maintain stands of deergrass, and induce the production of long straight stalks for use in basketry. Each basket required over 3000 stalks, driving the need for cultivation. Without periodic traditional burning, deergrass needs annual or biannual haircuts, otherwise it collects an excess of dead thatch and becomes a fire hazard. It is believed that much of its current distribution is due to propagation by Native Americans.
