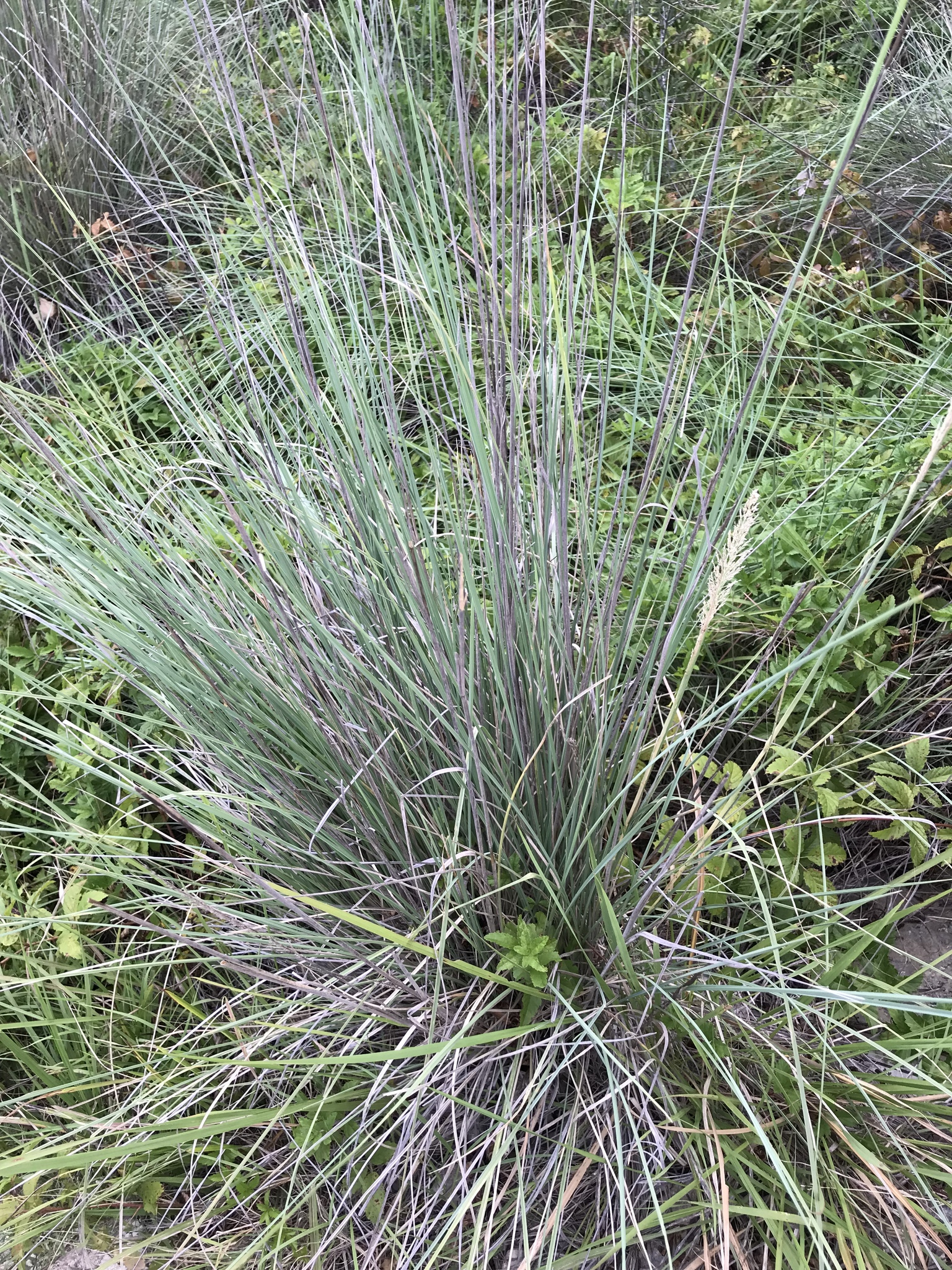

Conservation status
- Apparently Secure (NatureServe)

Scientific classification
- Kingdom: Plantae
- Clade: Tracheophytes
- Clade: Angiosperms
- Clade: Monocots
- Clade: Commelinids
- Order: Poales
- Family: Poaceae
- Subfamily: Chloridoideae
- Genus: Muhlenbergia
- Species: M. lindheimeri

Binomial name
- Muhlenbergia lindheimeri Hitchc.

= Muhlenbergia lindheimeri =

Species of flowering plant

Muhlenbergia lindheimeri is a species of bunch grass, 3-6' H, known by the common names big muhly, blue muhly, and Lindheimer's muhly. It is native to North America, where it can be found in northern Mexico and up to the Edwards Plateau region of Texas.

This species is a perennial grass, forming clumps of erect stems up to 1.5 meters tall. The ligule may be up to 3.5 centimeters in length. The leaves are up to 55 centimeters long and are flat or folded. The inflorescence is a panicle up to 50 centimeters long, which is often purplish in color, with grayish spikelets.

This grass provides graze for cattle and horses, but it is not very palatable because of its wiry texture. In the wild, the grass grows in calcareous soils. It is also grown as an ornamental grass, as it is useful as a green screen (instead of Pampass grass), erosion control, water retention and nest material for many species of birds

Ornamental cultivars of this species include 'Autumn Glow'.
