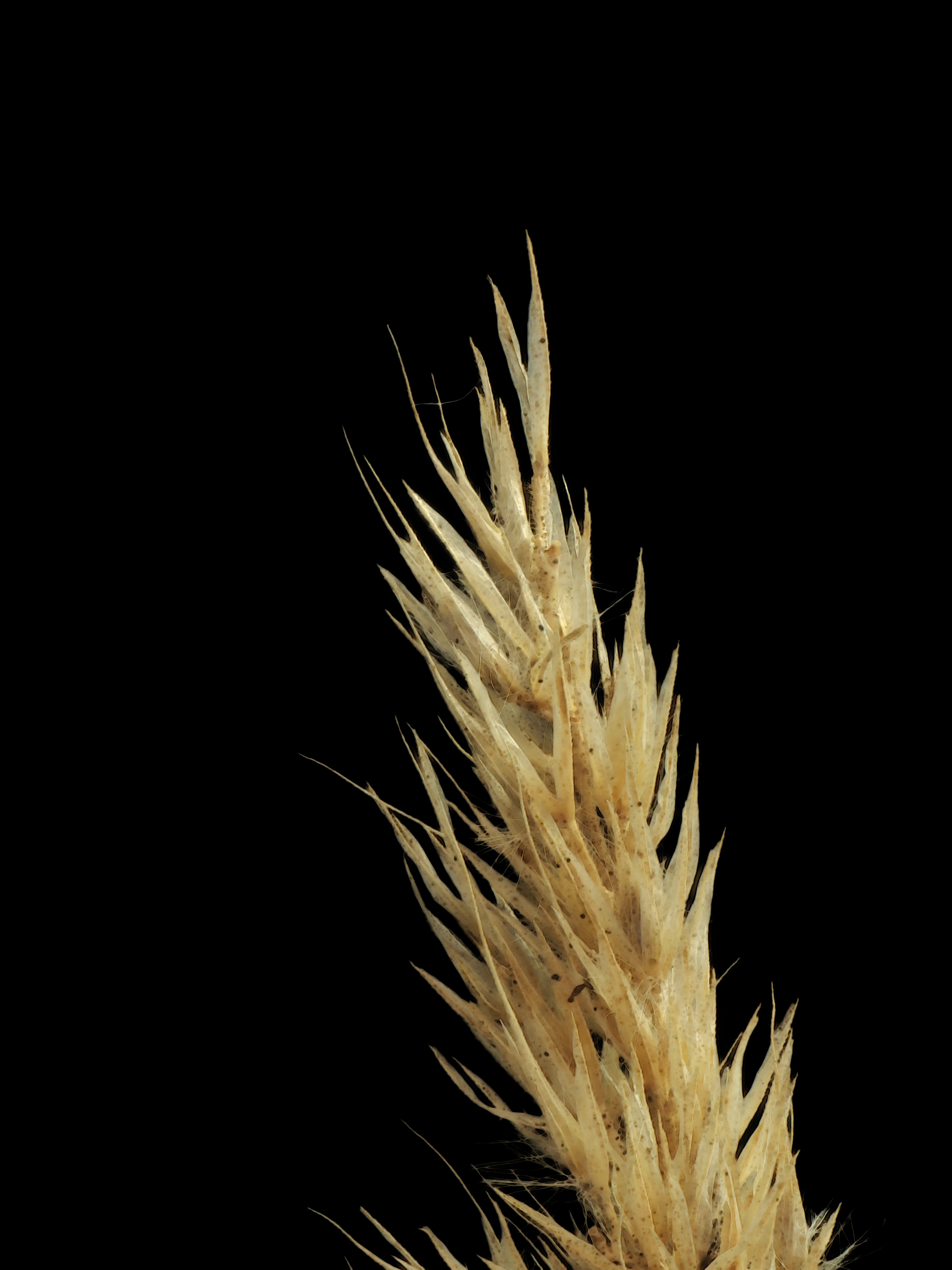

Conservation status
- Apparently Secure (NatureServe)

Scientific classification
- Kingdom: Plantae
- Clade: Tracheophytes
- Clade: Angiosperms
- Clade: Monocots
- Clade: Commelinids
- Order: Poales
- Family: Poaceae
- Subfamily: Chloridoideae
- Genus: Muhlenbergia
- Species: M. andina

Binomial name
- Muhlenbergia andina (Nutt.) Hitchc.

Synonyms
- Muhlenbergia comata

= Muhlenbergia andina =

Species of flowering plant

Muhlenbergia andina, known by the common name foxtail muhly, is a species of grass.

== Distribution ==
It is native to western North America from British Columbia to California to Texas. It grows in moist habitat such as meadows, marshes, and riparian riverbanks.

== Description ==
Muhlenbergia andina is a rhizomatous perennial grass growing 25 to 85 centimeters tall. The inflorescence is a narrow, dense cluster of appressed, upright branches bearing small, silky-haired spikelets.
