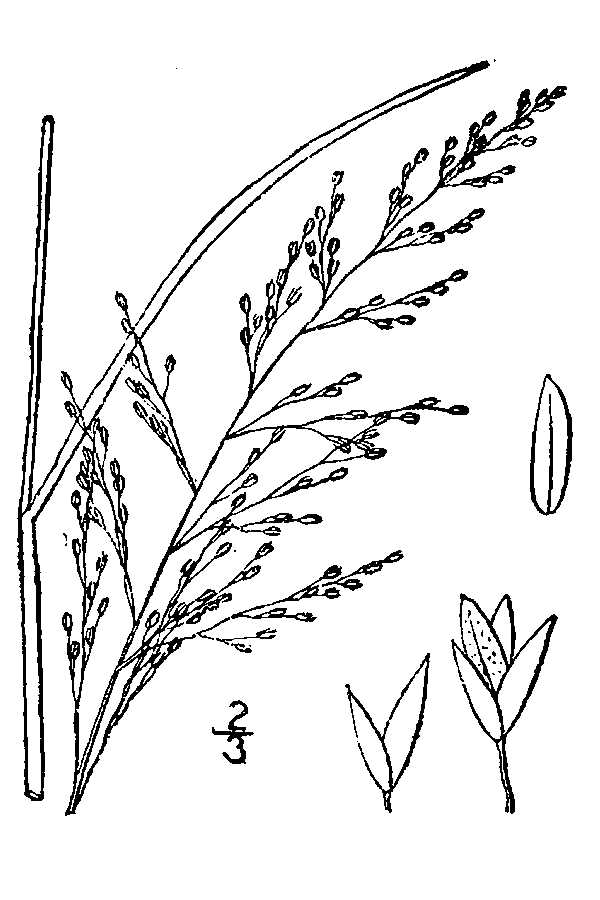
- 1913 illustration

Conservation status
- Vulnerable (NatureServe)

Scientific classification
- Kingdom: Plantae
- Clade: Tracheophytes
- Clade: Angiosperms
- Clade: Monocots
- Clade: Commelinids
- Order: Poales
- Family: Poaceae
- Subfamily: Chloridoideae
- Genus: Muhlenbergia
- Species: M. torreyana

Binomial name
- Muhlenbergia torreyana (Schult.) Hitchc.

= Muhlenbergia torreyana =

Species of grass

Muhlenbergia torreyana is a North American species of grass known by the common names New Jersey muhly, Torrey's muhly, pinebarren smokegrass, and Torrey's dropseed. It is native to the eastern United States, where today it occurs in Maryland, New Jersey, North Carolina, and Tennessee. It has been extirpated from Delaware, Georgia, and New York.

This rhizomatous perennial grass produces compressed, blue-green stems up to 75 centimeters tall. The stiff, sharp-pointed leaves are up to 20 centimeters in length. The inflorescence is a cylindrical panicle of tiny purple flowers. Flowering occurs in August through October.

This plant is considered rare in the states where it persists. There are about 67 occurrences, mostly in New Jersey, where it is locally abundant in the Pine Barrens. It also occurs on the coastal plain of Maryland and North Carolina. It is disjunct in central Tennessee.

This species requires regimes of natural disturbance to keep the habitat open, such as flooding and wildfire. One threat to its survival is fire suppression, which allows taller plants and trees to grow into the habitat. Another threat common across its range is recreational vehicles. It is threatened by direct habitat loss to development and agriculture.
