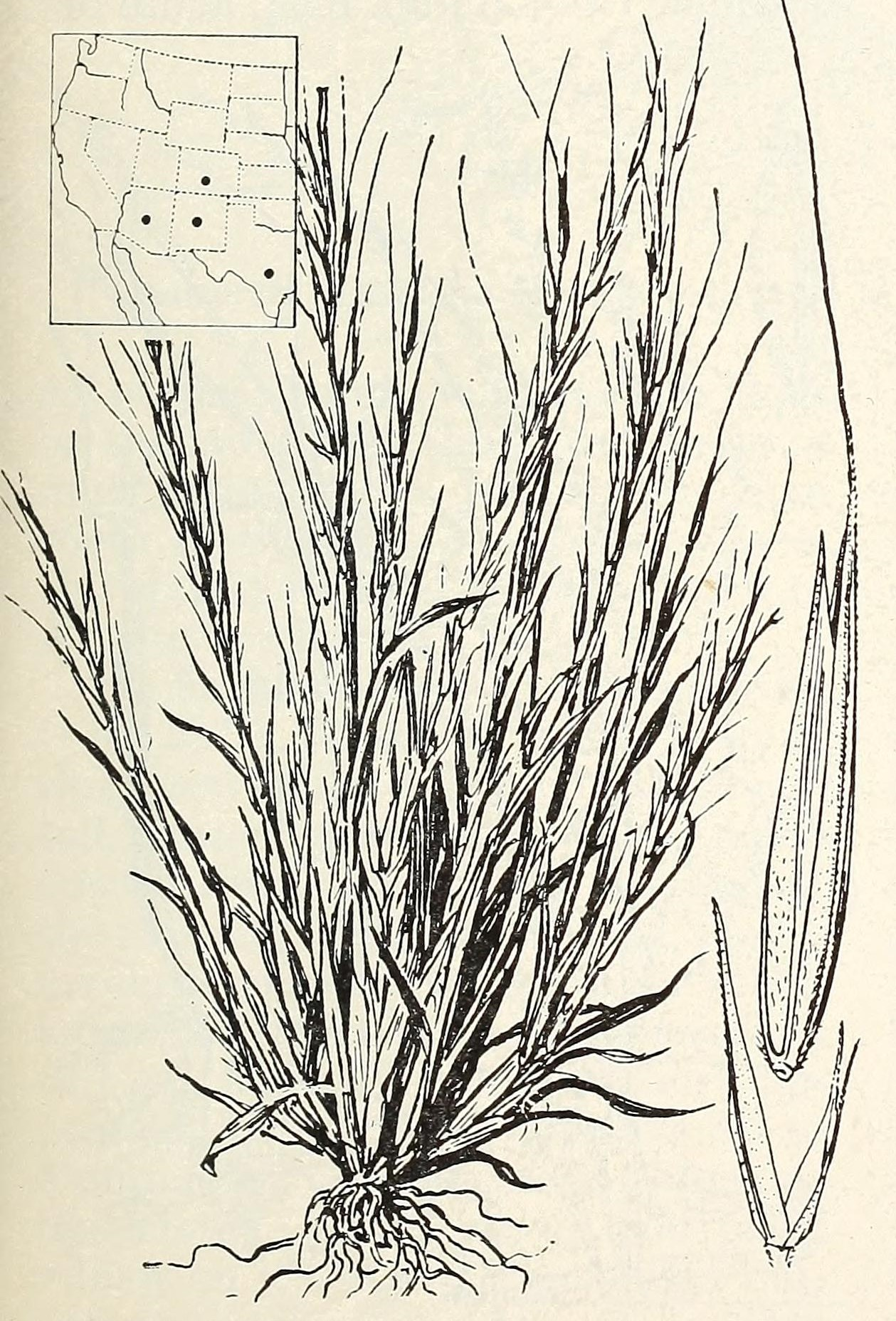

Conservation status
- Secure (NatureServe)

Scientific classification
- Kingdom: Plantae
- Clade: Tracheophytes
- Clade: Angiosperms
- Clade: Monocots
- Clade: Commelinids
- Order: Poales
- Family: Poaceae
- Subfamily: Chloridoideae
- Genus: Muhlenbergia
- Species: M. filiformis

Binomial name
- Muhlenbergia filiformis (Thurb. ex S.Watson) Rydb.

= Muhlenbergia filiformis =

Species of grass

Muhlenbergia filiformis, known by the common name Pullup muhly, is a species of grass. It is native to western North America from western Canada to northern Mexico.

Pullup muhly grows in many types of moist to wet habitats.

== Description ==
Muhlenbergia filiformis is an annual herb producing clumps of decumbent stems up to 30 centimeters long which root where their nodes touch the substrate. The inflorescence is a narrow, cylindrical array of appressed branches bearing many spikelets each about a millimeter long.
