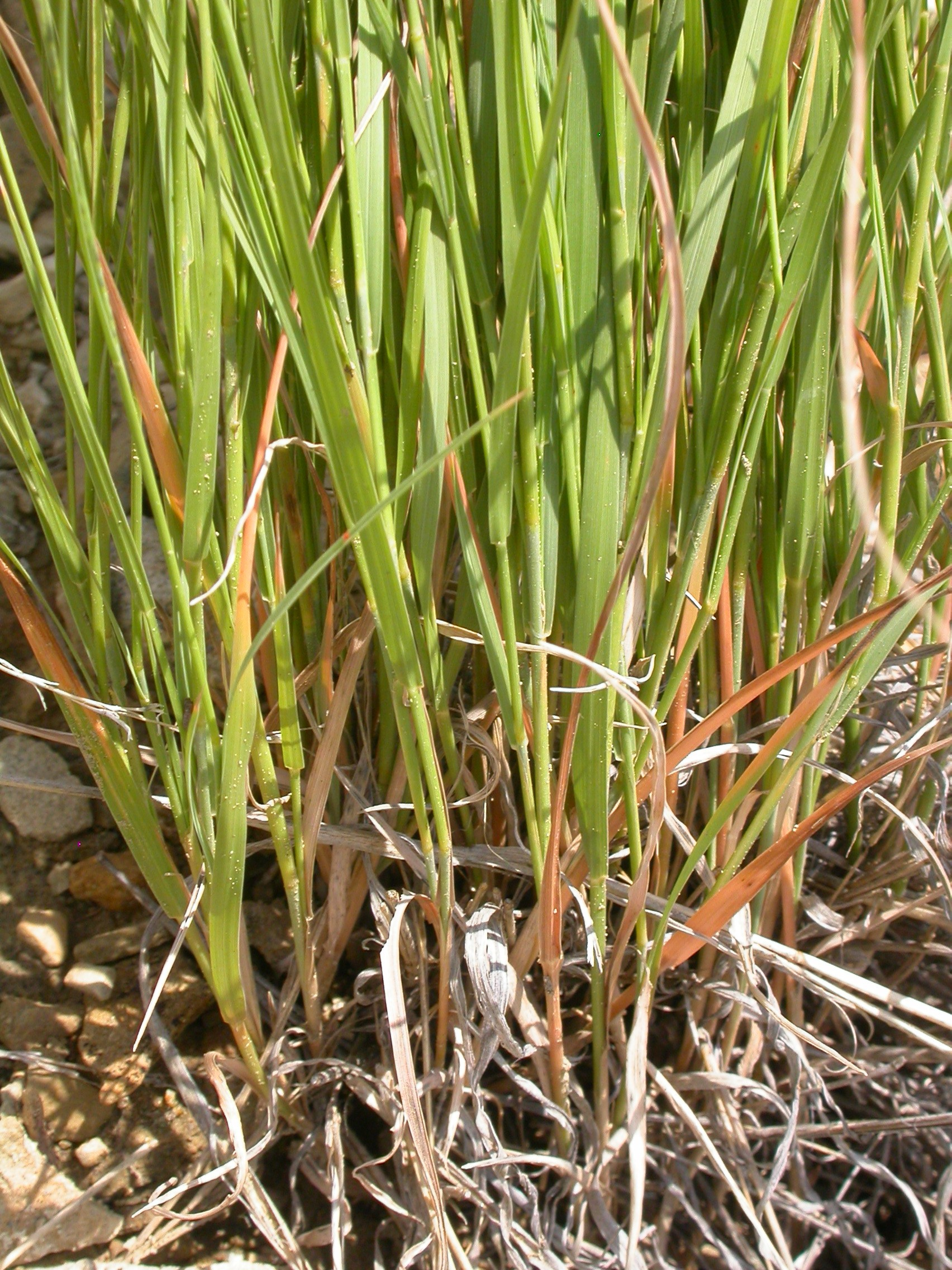

Conservation status
- Secure (NatureServe)

Scientific classification
- Kingdom: Plantae
- Clade: Tracheophytes
- Clade: Angiosperms
- Clade: Monocots
- Clade: Commelinids
- Order: Poales
- Family: Poaceae
- Subfamily: Chloridoideae
- Genus: Muhlenbergia
- Species: M. cuspidata

Binomial name
- Muhlenbergia cuspidata (Torr. ex Hook.) Rydb.

= Muhlenbergia cuspidata =

Species of flowering plant

Muhlenbergia cuspidata is a species of grass known by the common name plains muhly. It is native to North America where it is distributed across central Canada and the central United States.

This perennial grass grows in clumps. It has shallow fibrous roots. The stems have thick, knotty, scaly bases and grow up to about 60 centimeters tall. The leaves are narrow and may be flat or folded. The inflorescence is a panicle that is very narrow and spikelike, with an uneven row of short branches. The dark green or grayish spikelets contain usually one but sometimes two flowers. Blooming occurs in June through October.

This grass is most common in the northern Great Plains where it grows in shortgrass prairie habitat. It is a dominant species on sloping land and it may be codominant with blue grama (Bouteloua gracilis) and western wheatgrass (Pascopyrum smithii). It also grows on mixed-grass prairies, sometimes codominating with little bluestem (Schizachyrium scoparium). It is a less common species on tallgrass prairies. It is most common on dry soils and it is drought-tolerant. It may also grow on eroded land.

Many animals utilize the grass. Wild turkeys eat the seeds. A number of true bugs live only on this grass species. Many wild and domesticated ungulates feed on it.

The Navajo people used this plant to make hairbrushes and brooms.
