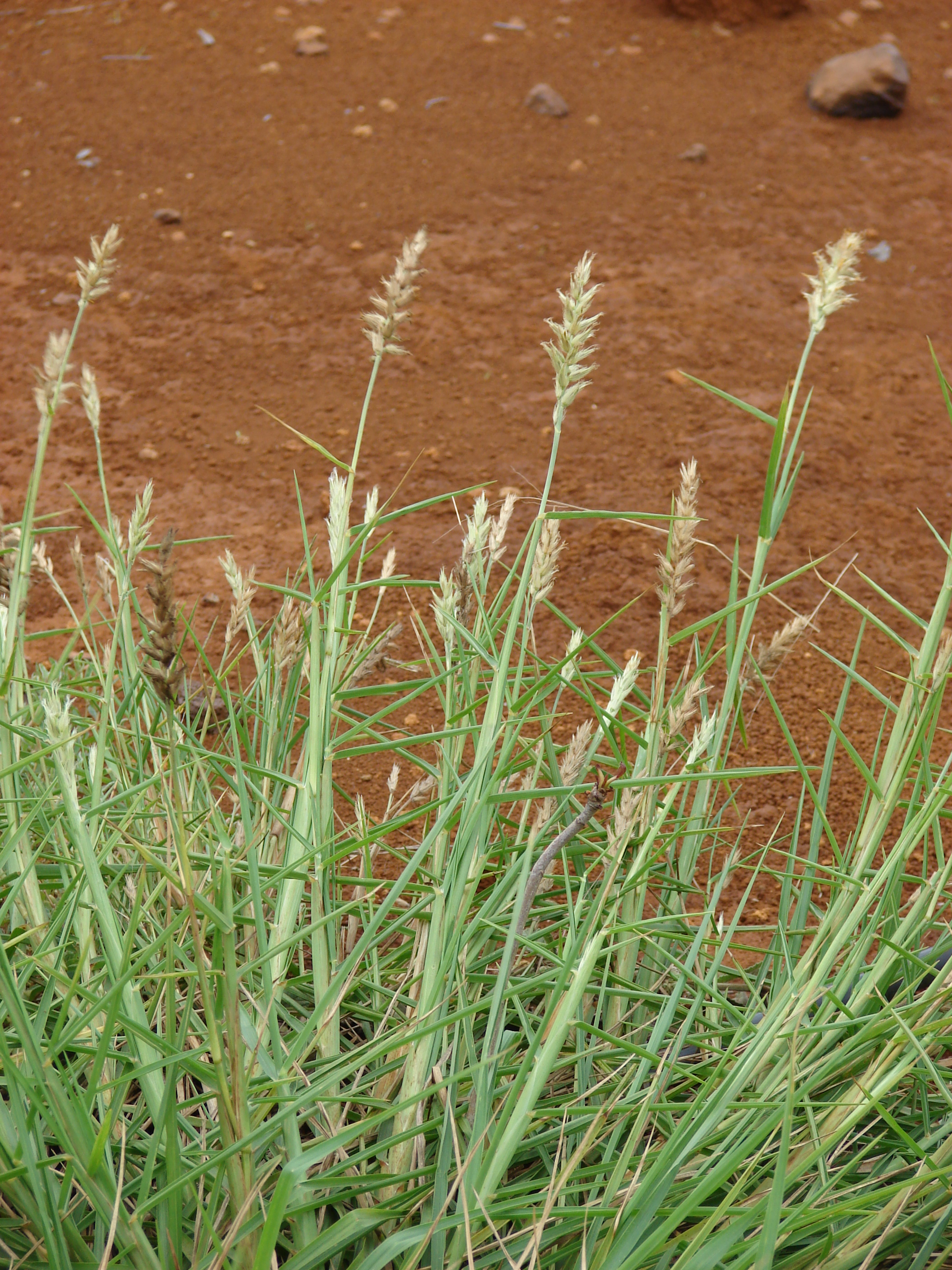

Conservation status
- Endangered (IUCN 3.1)

Scientific classification
- Kingdom: Plantae
- Clade: Tracheophytes
- Clade: Angiosperms
- Clade: Monocots
- Clade: Commelinids
- Order: Poales
- Family: Poaceae
- Subfamily: Panicoideae
- Genus: Cenchrus
- Species: C. agrimonioides

Binomial name
- Cenchrus agrimonioides Trin.

= Cenchrus agrimonioides =

Species of grass

Cenchrus agrimonioides is a rare species of grass in the family Poaceae that is endemic to the Hawaiian Islands. Its common names include Kāmanomano and agrimony sandbur. It was formerly distributed throughout the major islands but today is largely limited to Oʻahu. Kāmanomano can take root in both dry and moist forests as well as lava plains. It is threatened by competition with non-native plants, predation by ungulates, and wildfire. When it became a federally listed endangered species of the United States in 1996, there were fewer than 100 specimens remaining in the wild. More recent counts revealed 181 wild individuals on Oʻahu and over 300 more which have been planted to augment the populations. This plant is mainly restricted to the island of Oʻahu, but there are a select few individuals documented on Maui. A few patches of the grass have been planted on Kahoʻolawe as well.

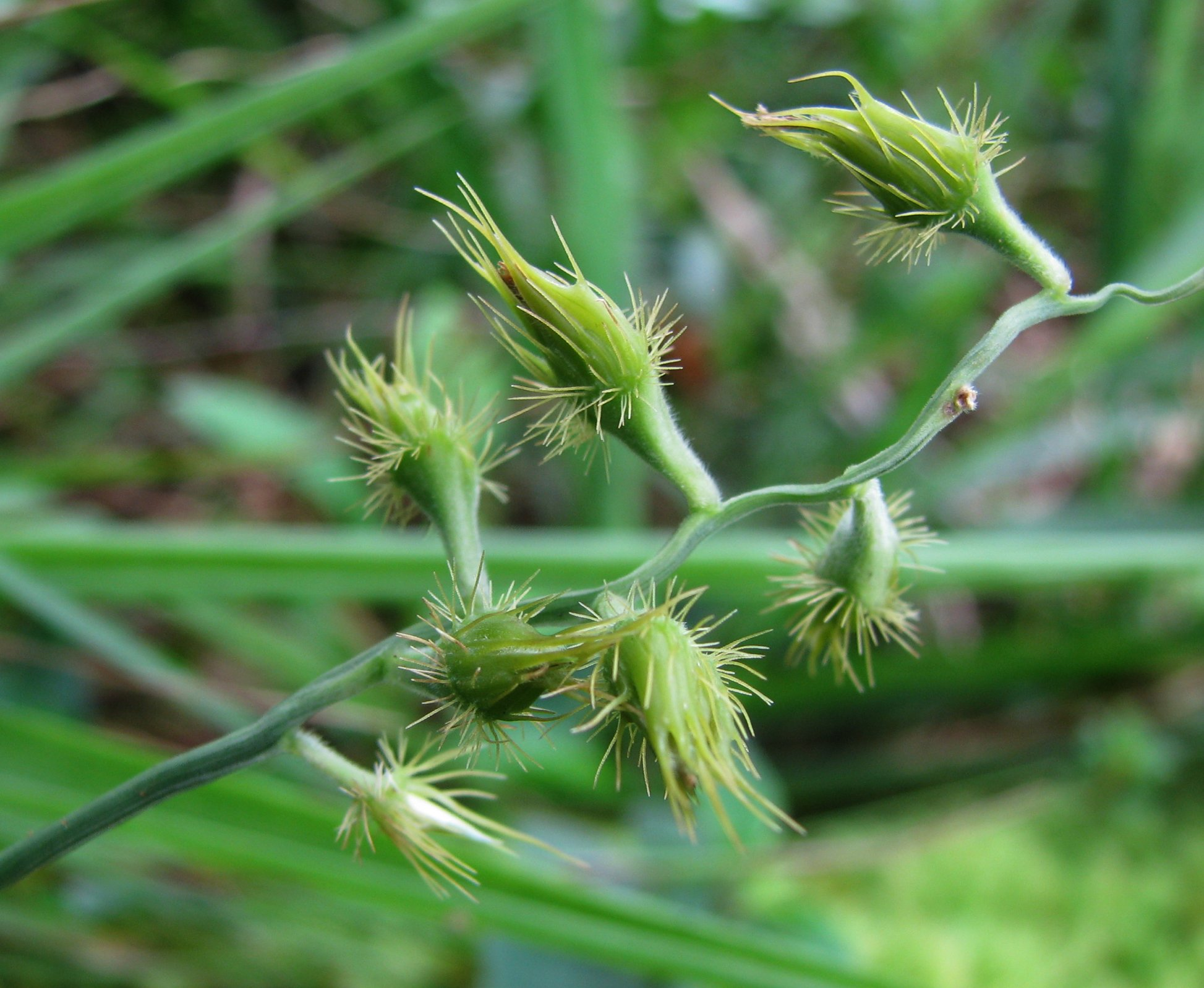
C. agrimonioides var. agrimonioides

Cenchrus agrimonioides var. laysanensis, a variety of this species endemic to the Northwestern Hawaiian Islands, became extinct in the 1980s. Remaining plants of this species are the variety agrimonioides.

This is a perennial grass which produces is flowers and fruits within spiny burs. These burs attach to animals, which might then disperse the seeds.
