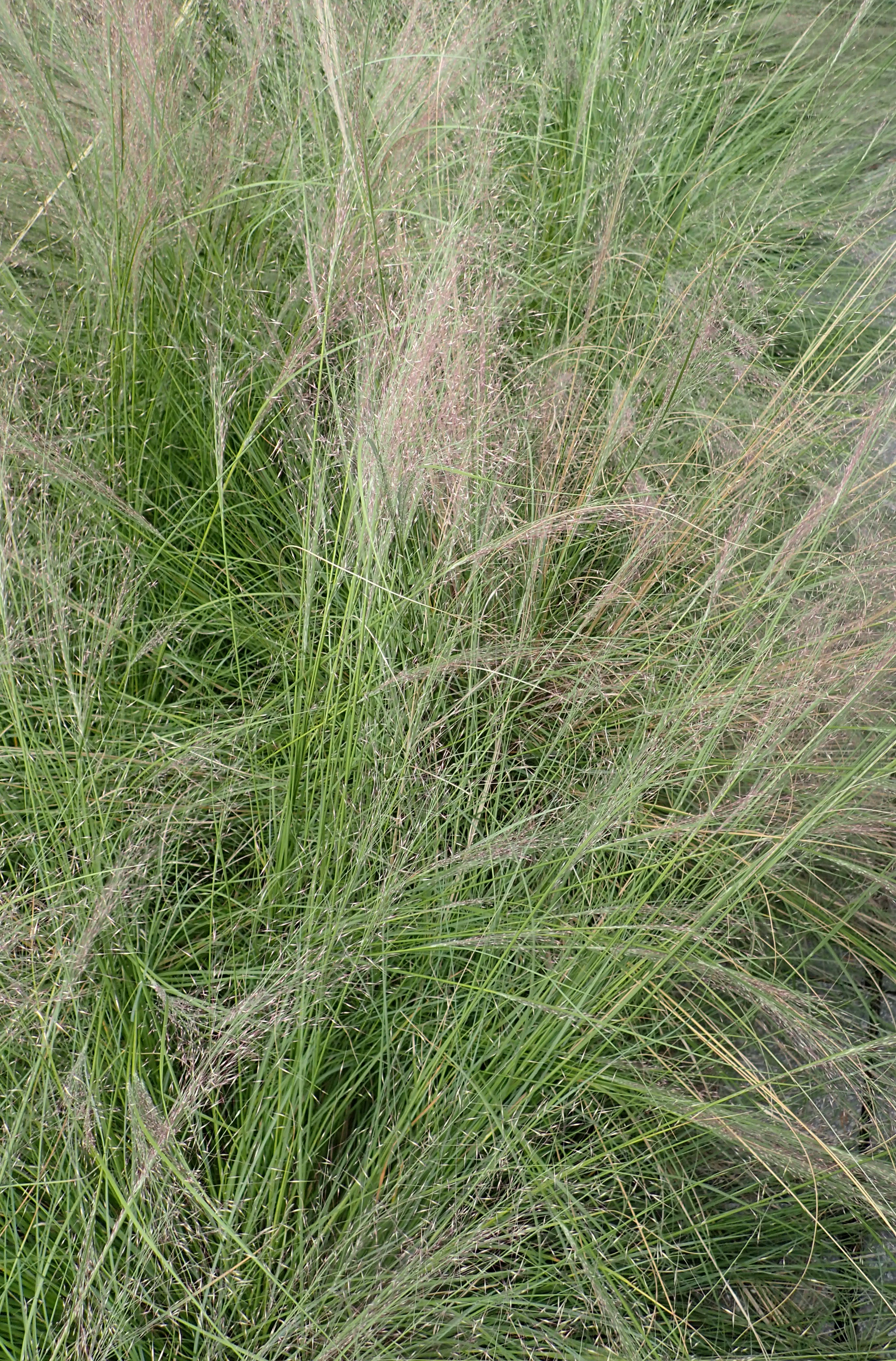

Conservation status
- Apparently Secure (NatureServe)

Scientific classification
- Kingdom: Plantae
- Clade: Tracheophytes
- Clade: Angiosperms
- Clade: Monocots
- Clade: Commelinids
- Order: Poales
- Family: Poaceae
- Subfamily: Chloridoideae
- Genus: Muhlenbergia
- Species: M. reverchonii

Binomial name
- Muhlenbergia reverchonii Vasey & Scribn.

= Muhlenbergia reverchonii =

Species of flowering plant

Muhlenbergia reverchonii is a North American species of grass known by the common name seep muhly. It is native to Oklahoma and Texas in the United States.

This perennial bunchgrass produces erect stems up to 80 centimeters (31.5 inches) tall. The hairlike leaves are up to 35 centimeters long. The inflorescence is a panicle of brown to purplish spikelets. Aged stands of the grass "form a curly, fibrous mass".

In the wild this grass grows on rocky calcareous substrates, such as limestone outcrops.

This grass is used for ornamental purposes. The cultivar 'Autumn Embers' has a panicle with a more pink coloration.
