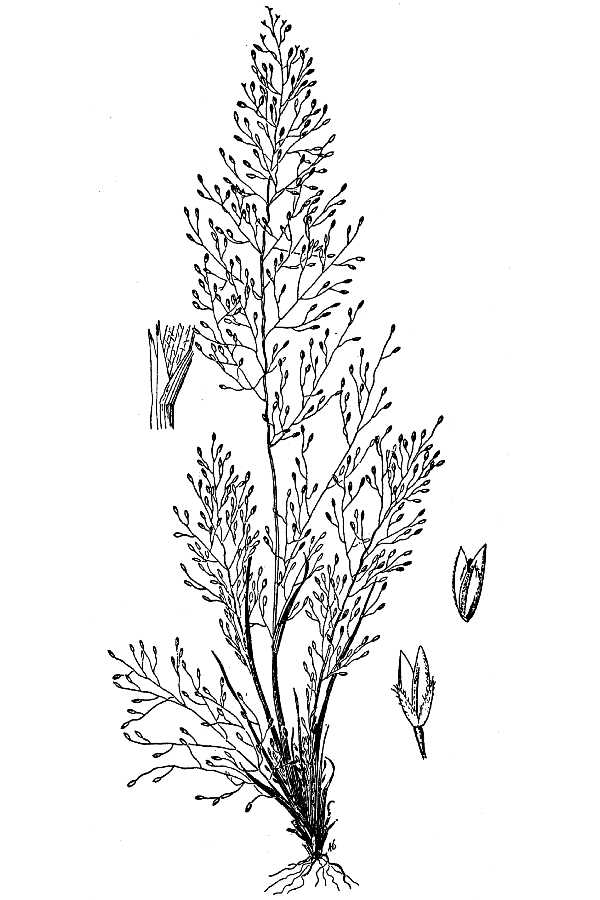

Conservation status
- Secure (NatureServe)

Scientific classification
- Kingdom: Plantae
- Clade: Tracheophytes
- Clade: Angiosperms
- Clade: Monocots
- Clade: Commelinids
- Order: Poales
- Family: Poaceae
- Subfamily: Chloridoideae
- Genus: Muhlenbergia
- Species: M. minutissima

Binomial name
- Muhlenbergia minutissima (Steud.) Swallen

= Muhlenbergia minutissima =

Species of flowering plant

Muhlenbergia minutissima is a species of grass known by the common name annual muhly. It is native to North America.

== Description ==
It is an annual bunchgrass growing 30 centimeters tall. The inflorescence is an open, spreading array of hair-thin branches bearing millimeter-long spikelets.

== Distribution ==
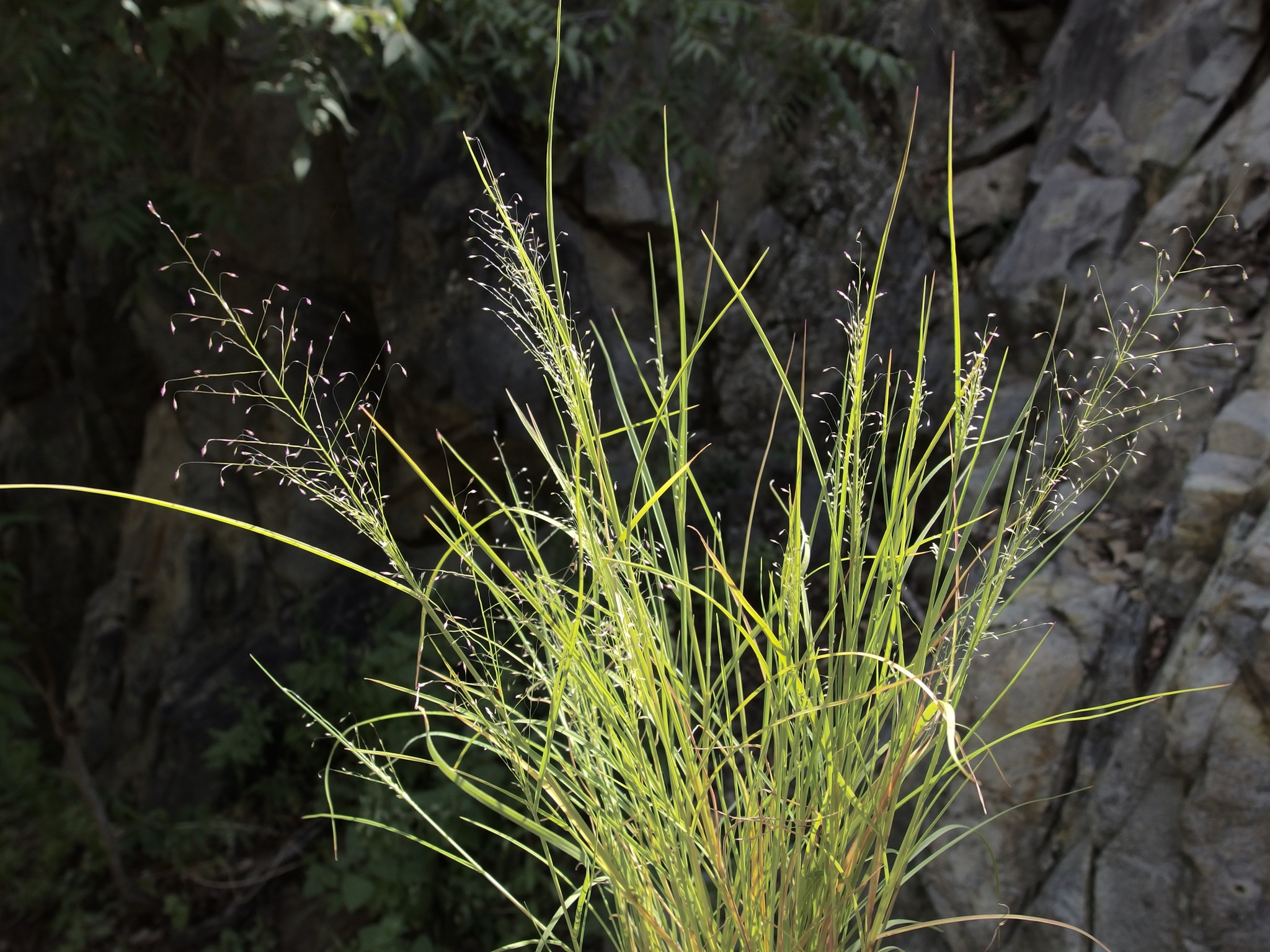
Muhlenbergia minutissima

It is found throughout the western United States and much of Mexico. It can be found in many habitat types, including disturbed areas.
