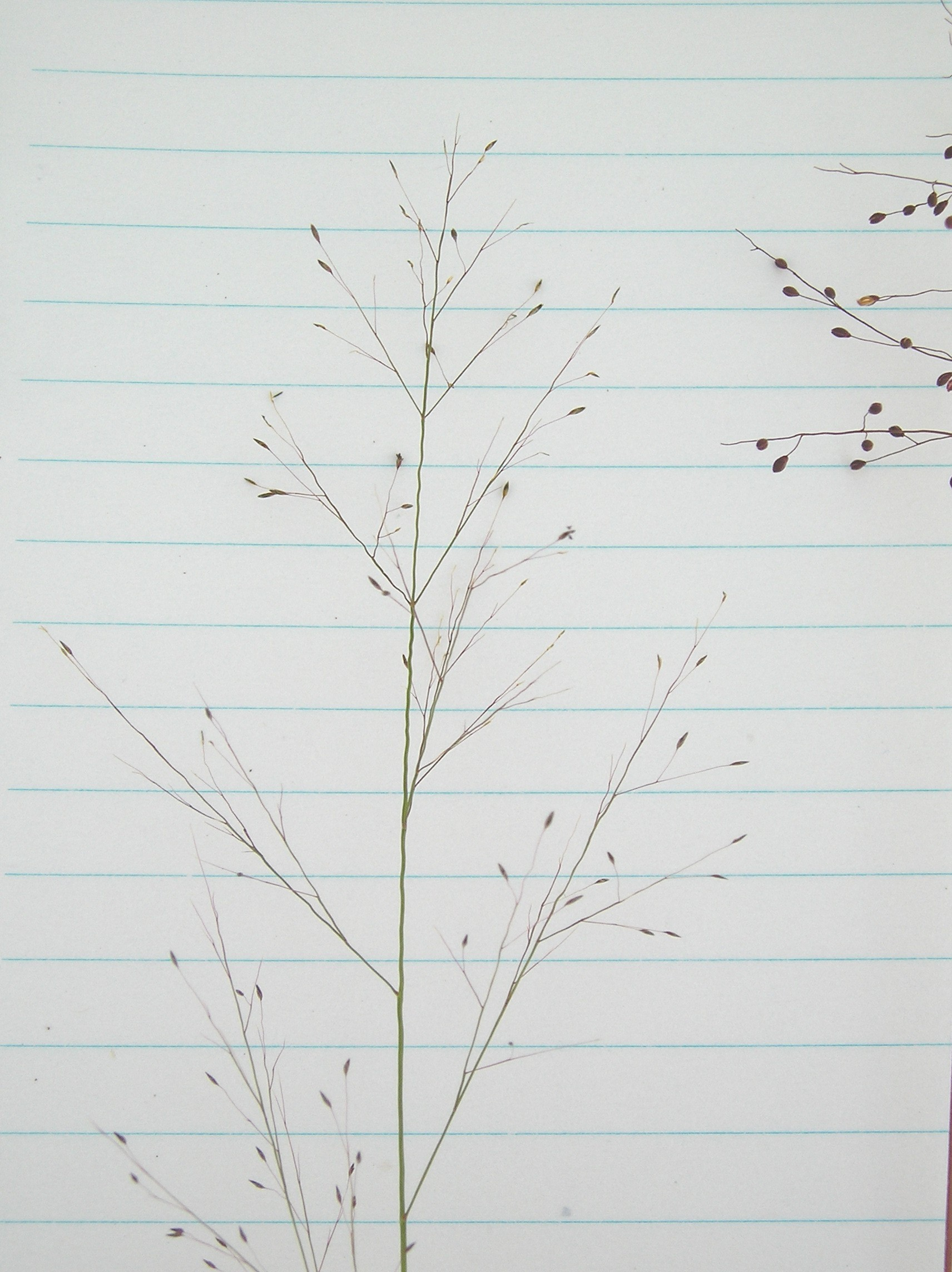
- Showing panicle.

Conservation status
- Least Concern (IUCN 3.1)

Scientific classification
- Kingdom: Plantae
- Clade: Tracheophytes
- Clade: Angiosperms
- Clade: Monocots
- Clade: Commelinids
- Order: Poales
- Family: Poaceae
- Subfamily: Chloridoideae
- Genus: Muhlenbergia
- Species: M. uniflora

Binomial name
- Muhlenbergia uniflora (Muhl.) Fernald

Synonyms
- Agrostis serotina Torr.; Muhlenbergia uniflora var. terrae-novae Fernald; Muhlenbergia uniflora var. uniflora; Poa modesta Tuck.; Poa uniflora Muhl.; Sporobolus serotinus A.Gray; Sporobolus uniflorus (Muhl.) Scribn. & Merr.; Vilfa serotina A.Gray; Vilfa serotina Torr. ex Trin.; Vilfa tenera Trin.

= Muhlenbergia uniflora =

Species of grass

Muhlenbergia uniflora is a small North American species of grass, commonly called one-flowered muhly. It is native to the northeastern United States and adjoining area of Canada.

== Description ==
Muhlenbergia uniflora is a small perennial grass that is non-rhizomatous. Culms (stems) are tufted, and are 2–4 dm tall. The one-flowered spikelets are purple, arranged in open, diffuse panicles. The glumes are much shorter than the lemmas, and both are awnless.
