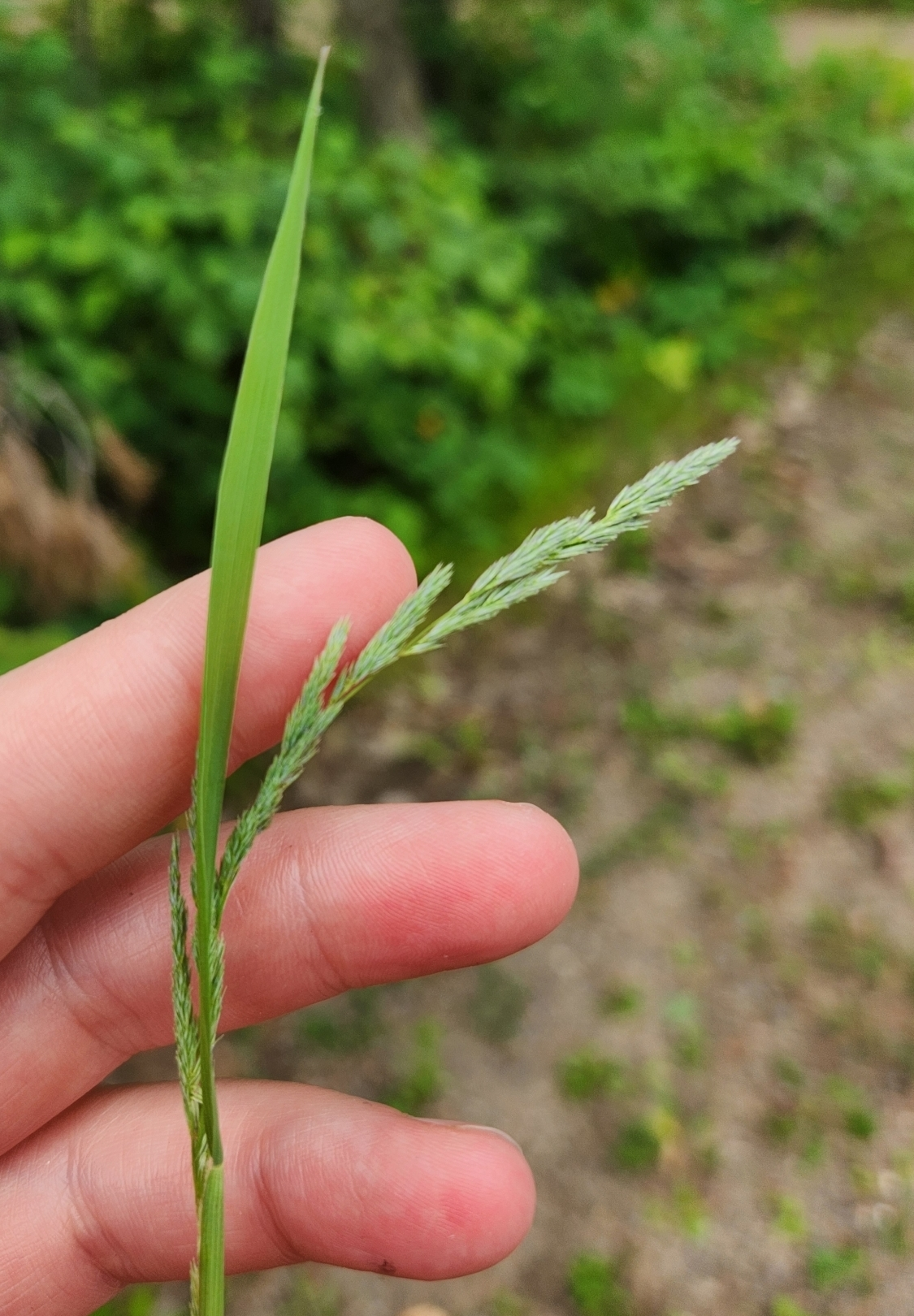

Conservation status
- Secure (NatureServe)

Scientific classification
- Kingdom: Plantae
- Clade: Tracheophytes
- Clade: Angiosperms
- Clade: Monocots
- Clade: Commelinids
- Order: Poales
- Family: Poaceae
- Subfamily: Chloridoideae
- Genus: Muhlenbergia
- Species: M. mexicana

Binomial name
- Muhlenbergia mexicana (L.) Trin.

= Muhlenbergia mexicana =

Species of grass

Muhlenbergia mexicana or Mexican muhly is a species of grass. It is native to North America, including most of the United States and southern Canada.

== Description ==
Muhlenbergia mexicana is a rhizomatous perennial herb growing 30 to 70 centimeters tall. The inflorescence is a narrow series of short, appressed to upright branches lined densely in small, pointed spikelets each a few millimeters long.

== Taxonomy ==
Muhlenbergia mexicana was first described by Carl Linnaeus in 1767 as Agrostis mexicana. The species name mexicana is a misnomer as the species is not found in Mexico; Linnaeus knew the species only from specimens grown in gardens and later authors have suggested that he was mistaken about the origin of the seeds these specimens were grown from. In 1824 the species was transferred to the genus Muhlenbergia by botanist Carl Bernhard von Trinius.

== Habitat ==
Muhlenbergia mexicana is known mainly from moist and wet habitat, such as meadows, wetlands, seeps, and drainage ditches.
