= Muhlenbergia alopecuroides =

Conservation status
- Secure (NatureServe)

Scientific classification
- Kingdom: Plantae
- Clade: Tracheophytes
- Clade: Angiosperms
- Clade: Monocots
- Clade: Commelinids
- Order: Poales
- Family: Poaceae
- Subfamily: Chloridoideae
- Genus: Muhlenbergia
- Species: M. alopecuroides

Binomial name
- Muhlenbergia alopecuroides (Griseb.) P.M.Peterson & Columbus

Synonyms
- Lycurus alopecuroides Griseb.; Lycurus phleoides var. glaucifolius Beal; Lycurus setosus (Nutt.) C.Reeder; Pleopogon setosum Nutt.

Species of grass

Muhlenbergia alopecuroides, synonyms including Lycurus setosus, is a species of grass in the family Poaceae. It is native to the south western United States and northern Mexico, as well as to northern Argentina. It was first described by August Grisebach in 1874 as Lycurus alopecuroides. It is commonly known as the bristly wolfstail.

== Description ==
Muhlenbergia alopecuroides is a perennial mountain grass with a tufted habit. The erect stems have several nodes and grow from 30 cm (12 in) to 50 cm (20 in) in height and may have a few branches. The leaf blades are glabrous and grow up to 10 cm (3.9 in) long but only 2 mm (0.1 in) wide. They are rough or bristly and have a white midrib below. The flower panicles are 4 cm (1.6 in) to 8 cm (3.1 in) long and about 8 mm (0.3 in) wide. They are also bristly. It can be distinguished from the rather similar common wolfstail (Muhlenbergia phleoides) by the erect culms, longer ligules and differently shaped tips to the upper leaves.

== Habitat and range ==
Muhlenbergia alopecuroides grows at altitudes between 570 m (1,870 ft) and 3,400 m (11,200 ft). It is found on arid, free draining land, on mesas and rocky slopes. It occurs in the Southwestern United States and in northern Mexico. A separate population occurs in northern Argentina.
