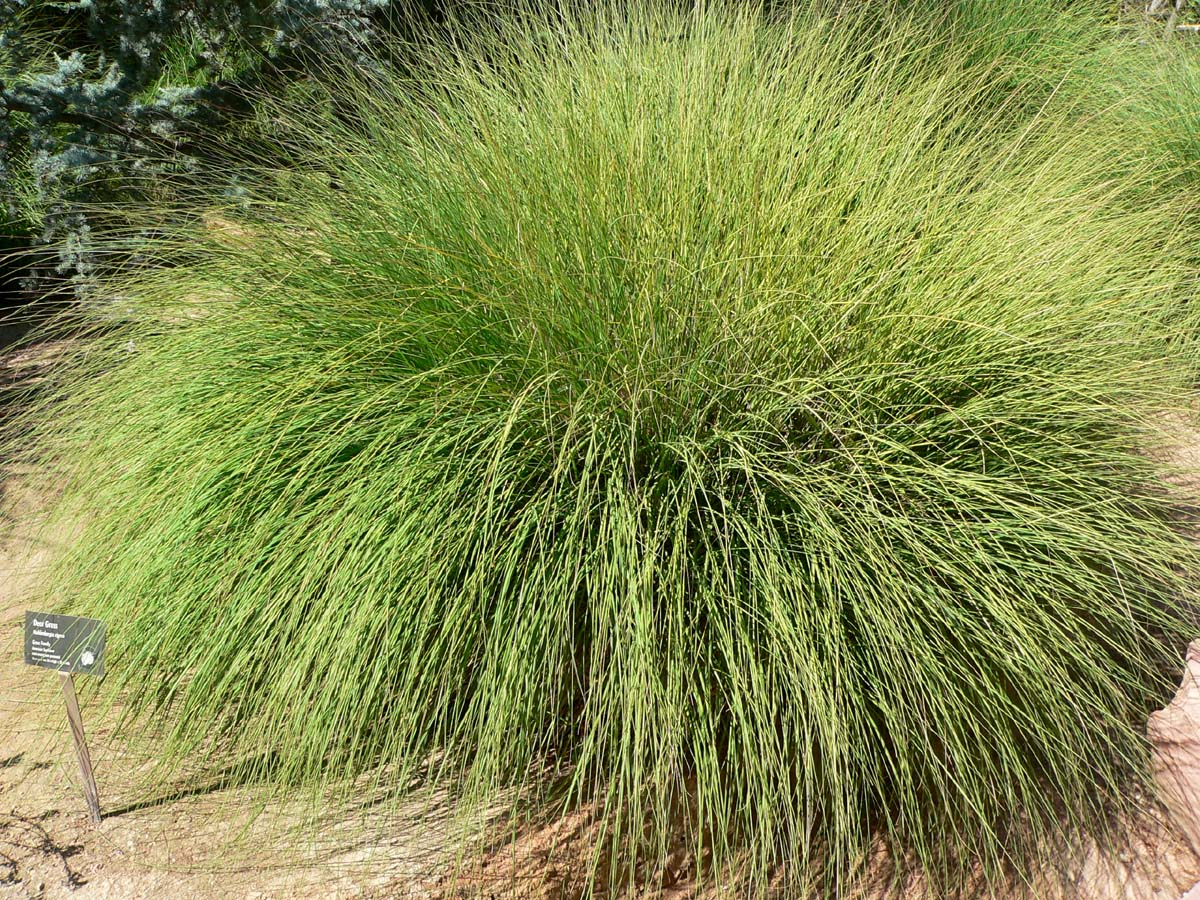
- Muhlenbergia rigens

Scientific classification
- Kingdom: Plantae
- Clade: Tracheophytes
- Clade: Angiosperms
- Clade: Monocots
- Clade: Commelinids
- Order: Poales
- Family: Poaceae
- Subfamily: Chloridoideae
- Tribe: Cynodonteae
- Subtribe: Muhlenbergiinae
- Genus: Muhlenbergia; Schreb.

Type species
- Muhlenbergia schreberi J.F.Gmel.

Synonyms
- Aegopogon Humb. & Bonpl. ex Willd. (1806); Anthipsimus Raf. (1819); Atherophora Willd. ex Steud. (1840), not validly publ.; Bealia Scribn. (1890); Blepharoneuron Nash (1898); Calycodon Nutt. (1848); Chaboissaea E.Fourn. ex Benth. & Hook.f. (1883); Cleomena Roem. & Schult. (1817); Clomena P.Beauv. (1812); Crypsinna E.Fourn. (1886); Dactylogramma Link (1833); Dilepyrum Michx. (1803); Epicampes J.Presl (1830); Flexularia Raf. (1819); Hymenothecium Lag. (1816); Lycurus Kunth (1816); Pereilema J.Presl (1830); Pleopogon Nutt. (1848); Podosemum Desv. (1810); Redfieldia Vasey (1887); Schaffnera Benth. (1882), nom. illeg.; Schaffnerella Nash (1912); Schedonnardus Steud. (1854); Schellingia Steud. (1850); Sericrostis Raf. (1825); Spirochloe Lunell (1915), nom. superfl.; Tosagris P.Beauv. (1812); Trichochloa P.Beauv. (1812); Trichochloa DC. (1813), illegitimate homonym not P.Beauv. (1812); Vaseya Thurb. (1863 publ. 1864)

= Muhlenbergia =

Genus of plants

Muhlenbergia is a genus of plants in the grass family.

The genus is named in honor of the German-American amateur botanist Gotthilf Heinrich Ernst Muhlenberg (1753-1815). Many of the species are known by the common name muhly. The greatest number are native to the southwestern United States and Mexico, but there are also native species in Canada, Central and South America and in Asia.

== Species ==
Species in the genus include:

- Muhlenbergia aguascalientensis Y.Herrera & De la Cerda - Aguascalientes
- Muhlenbergia alamosae Vasey - Aguascalientes, Chihuahua, Sonora, Sinaloa, Durango, Baja California, Baja California Sur, Guanajuato, Jalisco, Mexico State, Morelos, Zacatecas
- Muhlenbergia alopecuroides (Griseb.) P.M.Peterson & Columbus – southwestern US, northern Mexico, northern Argentina
- Muhlenbergia andina (Nutt.) Hitchc. – Foxtail muhly - western Canada, western United States
- Muhlenbergia angustata (J.Presl) Kunth - South America
- Muhlenbergia annua (Vasey) Swallen - Chihuahua, Sonora, Chiapas, Durango
- Muhlenbergia appressa C.O.Goodd. – Devil's Canyon muhly - United States (California Arizona), Baja California, Baja California Sur
- Muhlenbergia arenacea (Buckley) Hitchc. - United States (Colorado New Mexico Texas Arizona), Chihuahua, Sonora, Coahuila, San Luis Potosí, Zacatecas
- Muhlenbergia arenicola Buckley - United States (Arizona New Mexico Texas Oklahoma Kansas Colorado), Mexico, Argentina
- Muhlenbergia argentea Vasey - Mexico
- Muhlenbergia arizonica Scribn. United States (New Mexico Arizona), Mexico
- Muhlenbergia arsenei Hitchc. - United States (California Nevada Utah Arizona New Mexico), Mexico
- Muhlenbergia articulata Scribn. - Mexico
- Muhlenbergia asperifolia (Nees & Meyen ex Trin.) Parodi – Scratchgrass - from Canada to Chile
- Muhlenbergia atacamensis Parodi - Argentina, Bolivia
- Muhlenbergia aurea Swallen - Guatemala
- Muhlenbergia biloba Hitchc. - Mexico
- Muhlenbergia brandegeei C.Reeder - Baja California
- Muhlenbergia breviaristata (Hack.) Parodi - Argentina
- Muhlenbergia breviculmis Swallen - Guatemala
- Muhlenbergia brevifolia Scribn. ex Beal - Mexico
- Muhlenbergia breviligula Hitchc. - southern Mexico, Guatemala, Honduras, Nicaragua
- Muhlenbergia brevis Goodd. - United States (Arizona New Mexico Texas Colorado), Mexico
- Muhlenbergia breviseta E.Fourn. - Mexico
- Muhlenbergia brevivaginata Swallen - Mexico
- Muhlenbergia bushii R.W.Pohl - central + eastern United States
- Muhlenbergia californica Vasey – California muhly - California (San Bernardino, Riverside, + Los Angeles Counties)
- Muhlenbergia capillaris – Hairawn muhly - United States (from Texas to Massachusetts; Mexico, Guatemala, Bahamas, Cuba, Puerto Rico
- Muhlenbergia capillipes (M.E.Jones) P.M.Peterson & Annable - northeastern Mexico
- Muhlenbergia caxamarcensis Laegaard & Sánchez Vega - Peru
- Muhlenbergia ciliata (Kunth) Kunth - from central Mexico to northwestern Argentina
- Muhlenbergia crispiseta Hitchc. - western Texas, northern Mexico
- Muhlenbergia cualensis Y.Herrera & P.M.Peterson - southern Mexico
- Muhlenbergia curtifolia Scribn. - Arizona Nevada Utah Wyoming
- Muhlenbergia curtisetosa (Scribn.) Bush - from Ontario to Texas
- Muhlenbergia curviaristata (Ohwi) Ohwi - Japan, Manchuria, Kuril Islands
- Muhlenbergia cuspidata (Torr. ex Hook.) Rydb. – Plains muhly - from Alberta to Virginia
- Muhlenbergia decumbens Swallen - central Mexico
- Muhlenbergia depauperata Scribn. - United States (Arizona New Mexico Colorado Utah Texas), northeastern Mexico
- Muhlenbergia distichophylla (J.Presl) Kunth - Mexico, Guatemala
- Muhlenbergia diversiglumis Trin. - from northern Mexico to Peru
- Muhlenbergia dubia E.Fourn. - Arizona New Mexico Texas, Mexico
- Muhlenbergia dumosa – Bamboo muhly - Mexico, Arizona
- Muhlenbergia durangensis Y.Herrera - Durango
- Muhlenbergia duthieana Hack. - Pakistan, Nepal, Kashmir, Himanchal Pradesh, Uttaranchal
- Muhlenbergia elongata Scribn. ex Beal - Arizona (Pima + Santa Cruz Counties), northern Mexico
- Muhlenbergia eludens C.Reeder - United States (Arizona New Mexico Texas), northern Mexico
- Muhlenbergia emersleyi Vasey – Bullgrass - United States (Arizona Nevada New Mexico Texas North Carolina), Mexico, Guatemala, Honduras
- Muhlenbergia eriophylla Swallen - Mexico
- Muhlenbergia expansa – Cutover muhly - United States (Texas Oklahoma Louisiana Mississippi Alabama Georgia Florida South Carolina North Carolina Virginia Massachusetts)
- Muhlenbergia fastigiata (J.Presl) Henrard - Bolivia, Peru, Colombia, Chile, Argentina
- Muhlenbergia filiculmis Vasey - United States (Arizona New Mexico Utah Colorado Wyoming North Dakota)
- Muhlenbergia filiformis (Thurb. ex S.Watson) Rydb. – Pullup muhly - western United States, British Columbia, Sonora, Baja California
- Muhlenbergia flabellata Mez - Costa Rica, Panamá
- Muhlenbergia flavida Vasey - Mexico
- Muhlenbergia flaviseta Scribn. - Mexico
- Muhlenbergia flexuosa Hitchc. - Peru
- Muhlenbergia fragilis Swallen - Mexico, United States (California Nevada Utah Arizona New Mexico Texas)
- Muhlenbergia frondosa (Poir.) Fernald - eastern + central United States + Canada
- Muhlenbergia gigantea (E.Fourn.) Hitchc. - Mexico
- Muhlenbergia glabriflora Scribn. - south-central United States
- Muhlenbergia glauca (Nees) Mez - Mexico, United States (California Arizona New Mexico Texas)
- Muhlenbergia glomerata (Willd.) Trin. – Marsh muhly, spiked muhly - northern United States, Canada including Yukon + NWT
- Muhlenbergia grandis Vasey - Mexico
- Muhlenbergia gypsophila C.Reeder & Reeder - Mexico
- Muhlenbergia hakonensis (Hack.) Makino - China (Sichuan, Anhui), Korea, Japan
- Muhlenbergia himalayensis Hack. ex Hook.f. - Afghanistan, northern Pakistan, Tajikistan, northern + eastern India, Tibet, Nepal, Bhutan, Sichuan, Yunnan
- Muhlenbergia hintonii Swallen - Mexico
- Muhlenbergia huegelii Trin. - widespread from Afghanistan to Primorye to New Guinea, including India + China
- Muhlenbergia implicata (Kunth) Trin. - Mesoamerica, Colombia, Venezuela
- Muhlenbergia inaequalis Soderstr. - Colombia, Venezuela
- Muhlenbergia involuta Swallen - Texas
- Muhlenbergia iridifolia Soderstr. - Mexico
- Muhlenbergia jaime-hintonii P.M.Peterson & Valdés-Reyna - Mexico
- Muhlenbergia jaliscana Swallen - Mexico
- Muhlenbergia japonica Steud. - China, Japan, Korea, Primorye, Khabarovsk
- Muhlenbergia jonesii (Vasey) Hitchc. - northeastern California
- Muhlenbergia laxa Hitchc. - Veracruz
- Muhlenbergia lehmanniana Henrard - Costa Rica, Panama, Colombia, Venezuela. Ecuador
- Muhlenbergia ligularis (Hack.) Hitchc. - from Costa Rica to Argentina
- Muhlenbergia ligulata (E.Fourn.) Scribn. & Merr. - Mexico
- Muhlenbergia lindheimeri Hitchc. – Lindheimer muhly, big muhly - Texas, Coahuila
- Muhlenbergia longiglumis Vasey - Mexico
- Muhlenbergia longiligula Hitchc. - Mexico, United States (Arizona New Mexico Texas Nevada)
- Muhlenbergia lucida Swallen - Mexico
- Muhlenbergia macroura (Humb., Bonpl. & Kunth) Hitchc. - Mexico, Guatemala
- Muhlenbergia majalcensis P.M.Peterson - Mexico
- Muhlenbergia maxima Laegaard & Sánchez Vega - Peru
- Muhlenbergia mexicana (L.) Trin. – Mexican muhly - United States, Canada incl. Yukon
- Muhlenbergia michisensis Y.Herrera & P.M.Peterson - Mexico
- Muhlenbergia microsperma (District of Columbia.) Kunth – Littleseed muhly - United States (California Arizona Nevada Utah), Mexico, Guatemala, Colombia, Venezuela, Ecuador, Peru, Galápagos, Bolivia
- Muhlenbergia minutissima (Steud.) Swallen – Annual muhly - United States (Washington Oregon California Idaho Montana Wyoming Nebraska South Dakota Utah Nevada Arizona New Mexico Texas), Mexico, Guatemala
- Muhlenbergia monandra Alegría & Rúgolo - Peru
- Muhlenbergia montana (Nutt.) Hitchc. – Mountain muhly - United States (Montana Wyoming Colorado Utah Nevada Arizona California New Mexico Texas), Mexico
- Muhlenbergia mucronata (Kunth) Trin. - Mexico
- Muhlenbergia multiflora Columbus - western United States
- Muhlenbergia mutica (E.Fourn.) Hitchc. - Mexico
- Muhlenbergia nigra Hitchc. - Mexico, Costa Rica, Guatemala
- Muhlenbergia orophila Swallen - Mexico, Guatemala
- Muhlenbergia palmeri Vasey - Mexico, southern Arizona
- Muhlenbergia palmirensis Grignon & Lægaard - Ecuador
- Muhlenbergia paniculata (Nutt.) P.M.Peterson - central Canada, central + western United States, northeastern Mexico, northern Argentina
- Muhlenbergia pauciflora Buckley - United States (Colorado Utah Texas New Mexico Arizona California), Mexico
- Muhlenbergia pectinata Goodd. - Mexico, southern Arizona
- Muhlenbergia peruviana – Peruvian muhly - United States (Arizona New Mexico), Mesoamerica, western South America, Galápagos
- Muhlenbergia pilosa P.M.Peterson, Wipff & S.D.Jones - México State, Guerrero
- Muhlenbergia plumbea (Trin.) Hitchc. - Mexico, Guatemala
- Muhlenbergia polycaulis Scribn. - United States (Utah Texas New Mexico Arizona), Mexico
- Muhlenbergia porteri Scribn. ex Beal – Bush muhly - United States (Colorado Oklahoma Utah Nevada Texas New Mexico Arizona California), Mexico
- Muhlenbergia pubescens (Humb., Bonpl. & Kunth) Hitchc. - Mexico
- Muhlenbergia pubigluma Swallen - Mexico
- Muhlenbergia pungens Thurb. – Sandhill muhly - United States (Nebraska South Dakota Colorado Wyoming Arizona Utah New Mexico Texas)
- Muhlenbergia purpusii Mez - Mexico
- Muhlenbergia quadridentata (Kunth) Trin. - Mexico, Guatemala
- Muhlenbergia racemosa (Michx.) Britton, Sterns & Poggenb. – Green muhly, marsh muhly
- Muhlenbergia ramosa (Hack.) Makino - Canada, United States, northern Mexico
- Muhlenbergia ramulosa (Humb., Bonpl. & Kunth) Swallen - United States (Arizona New Mexico Colorado), Mesoamerica, Argentina
- Muhlenbergia reederorum Soderstr. - Mexico
- Muhlenbergia repens (J.Presl) Hitchc. - Mexico, United States (Arizona New Mexico Texas Colorado Oklahoma Utah)
- Muhlenbergia reverchonii – Seep muhly - United States (Texas Oklahoma)
- Muhlenbergia richardsonis – Mat muhly - Canada (incl Yukon + NWT), United States (Alaska plus northern + western states), northern + central Mexico
- Muhlenbergia rigens – Deergrass - Mexico, United States (California Nevada Arizona New Mexico Texas)
- Muhlenbergia rigida (Kunth) Kunth - United States (Arizona New Mexico Texas), Mexico, South America (Colombia to Argentina)
- Muhlenbergia robusta (E.Fourn.) Hitchc. - Mexico, Central America
- Muhlenbergia schmitzii Hack. - Mexico
- Muhlenbergia schreberi – Nimblewill - eastern + central United States, Ontario, Mexico, Uruguay, southern Brazil, northern Argentina
- Muhlenbergia scoparia Vasey - Mexico
- Muhlenbergia seatonii Scribn. ex Seaton - Mexico
- Muhlenbergia sericea (Michx.) P.M.Peterson United States (Texas Alabama Florida Georgia Louisiana Mississippi North Carolina South Carolina)
- Muhlenbergia setarioides E.Fourn. - Mexico, Central America
- Muhlenbergia setifolia Vasey - United States (Arizona New Mexico Texas), Mexico
- Muhlenbergia sinuosa Swallen - United States (Arizona New Mexico), Mexico
- Muhlenbergia sobolifera (Muhl.) Trin. - eastern + central United States, Ontario
- Muhlenbergia spatha Columbus - Mexico
- Muhlenbergia speciosa Vasey - Mexico
- Muhlenbergia spiciformis Trin. - Mexico, Cuba, United States (New Mexico Texas)
- Muhlenbergia straminea Hitchc. - Mexico, United States (New Mexico Arizona Texas)
- Muhlenbergia stricta (J.Presl) Kunth - Mexico
- Muhlenbergia strictior Beal - Mexico
- Muhlenbergia subaristata Swallen - Mexico
- Muhlenbergia subbiflora Hitchc. - Mexico
- Muhlenbergia sylvatica (Torr.) Torr. ex A. Gray – Woodland muhly - eastern + central United States, Quebec, Ontario
- Muhlenbergia tarahumara P.M.Peterson & Columbus - Mexico
- Muhlenbergia tenella (Kunth) Trin. - Mexico, Central America, Colombia, Argentina
- Muhlenbergia tenuiflora (Willd.) Britton, Stern & Poggenb. - eastern + central United States, Quebec, Ontario
- Muhlenbergia tenuifolia (Kunth) Kunth - United States (Texas New Mexico Arizona Colorado), Mexico, Peru, Argentina
- Muhlenbergia tenuissima (J.Presl) Kunth - Mexico, Central America
- Muhlenbergia texana Buckley - Mexico, United States (Arizona New Mexico Texas)
- Muhlenbergia thurberi (Scribn.) Rydb. - Mexico, United States (Texas New Mexico Arizona Colorado Utah Nevada)
- Muhlenbergia torreyana (Schult.) Hitchc. – New Jersey muhly, Torrey's muhly, Torrey's dropseed - New Jersey New York Delaware Maryland North Carolina Tennessee Georgia
- Muhlenbergia torreyi (Kunth) Hitchc. ex Bush - southwestern United States, Mexico, Argentina
- Muhlenbergia trifida Hack. - Mexico, Guatemala
- Muhlenbergia uniflora (Muhl.) Fernald - Canada, northeastern United States
- Muhlenbergia utilis (Torr.) Hitchc. – Aparejo grass - Mexico, United States (California Nevada Arizona New Mexico Texas)
- Muhlenbergia vaginata Swallen - Mexico, Guatemala
- Muhlenbergia venezuelae Luces - Mérida State in Venezuela
- Muhlenbergia versicolor Swallen - Mexico, Guatemala, Honduras
- Muhlenbergia villiflora Hitchc. - Mexico, United States (New Mexico Texas)
- Muhlenbergia virescens (Kunth) Kunth - Mexico
- Muhlenbergia virletii (E.Fourn.) Soderstr. - Mexico
- Muhlenbergia watsoniana Hitchc. - Mexico
- Muhlenbergia wrightii Vasey ex J.M.Coult. - Mexico, United States (Nevada Utah Colorado Arizona New Mexico Texas Texas Kansas)
- Muhlenbergia xanthodas Soderstr. - Chiapas

Numerous species are now considered better suited to other genera, such as Aegopogon, Agrostis, Apera, Arundinella, Brachyelytrum, Calamagrostis, Cinna, Dichelachne, Garnotia, Limnodea, Lycurus, Melinis, Ortachne, Sporobolus, Triniochloa.
