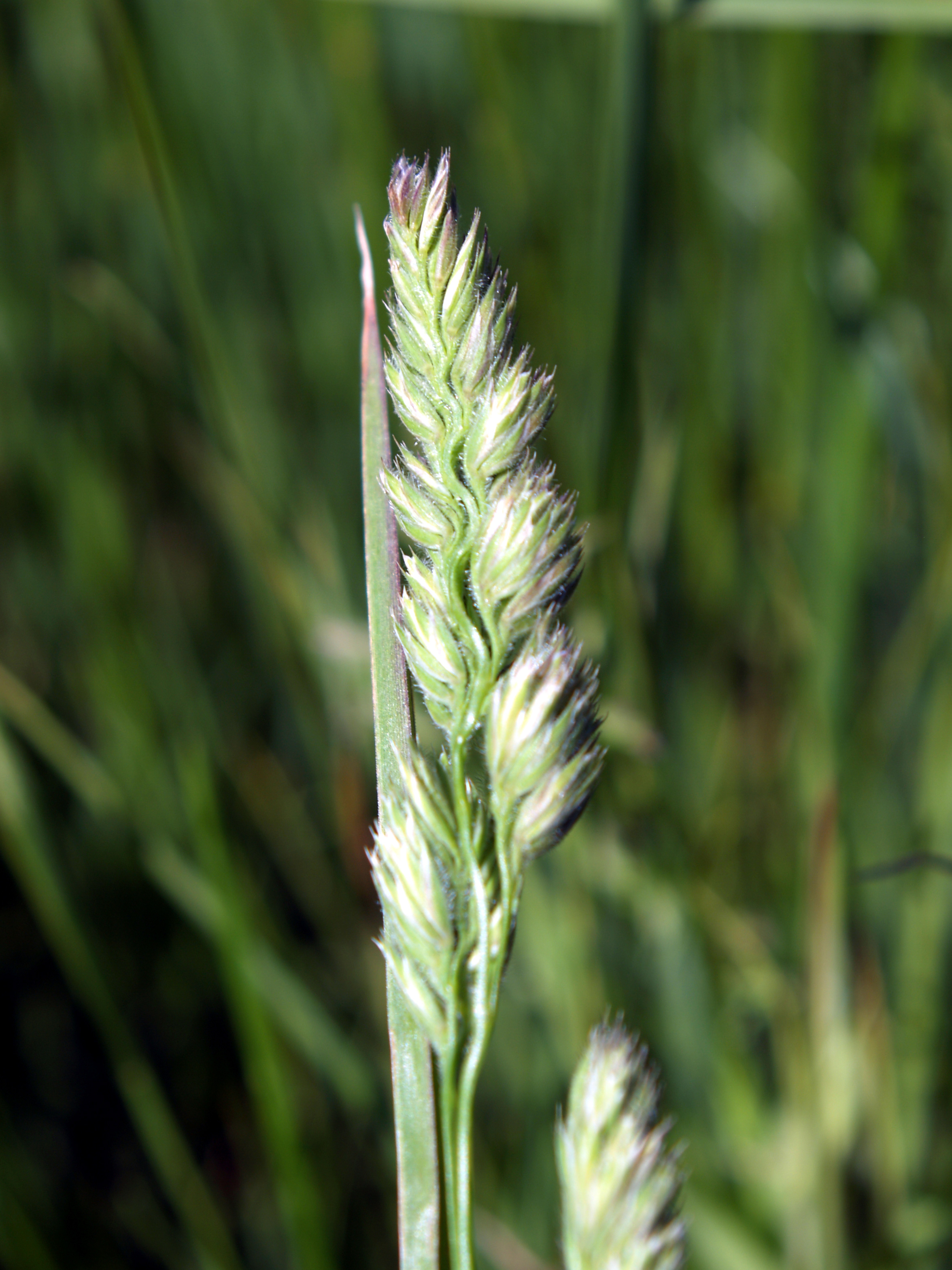

Conservation status
- Secure (NatureServe)

Scientific classification
- Kingdom: Plantae
- Clade: Tracheophytes
- Clade: Angiosperms
- Clade: Monocots
- Clade: Commelinids
- Order: Poales
- Family: Poaceae
- Subfamily: Chloridoideae
- Genus: Muhlenbergia
- Species: M. racemosa

Binomial name
- Muhlenbergia racemosa (Michx.) Britton, Sterns & Poggenb.

= Muhlenbergia racemosa =

Species of grass

Muhlenbergia racemosa is a species of grass known by the common names green muhly and marsh muhly. It is native to North America, where it is most common in the north-central United States. It also occurs in the western United States and northern Mexico.

This plant is a rhizomatous perennial grass with usually erect, branching stems up to 1.3 meters tall. The flat leaves are up to 18 centimeters long. The inflorescence is a narrow panicle up to 16 centimeters long.

This grass grows in many types of habitat, including disturbed areas. It is often found in wetlands and other moist and wet habitat types, but it can grow in dry areas. It can also be found at elevation; it is known from sites at 11,000 feet (3,400 m). It is a common grass, but rarely a dominant or abundant plant at any given site.
