= Muhlenbergia palmirensis =

Conservation status
- Endangered (IUCN 3.1)

Scientific classification
- Kingdom: Plantae
- Clade: Tracheophytes
- Clade: Angiosperms
- Clade: Monocots
- Clade: Commelinids
- Order: Poales
- Family: Poaceae
- Subfamily: Chloridoideae
- Genus: Muhlenbergia
- Species: M. palmirensis

Binomial name
- Muhlenbergia palmirensis Grignon & Lægaard

Species of grass

Muhlenbergia palmirensis is a species of grass in the family Poaceae. It is found only in Ecuador.
