= Muhlenbergia orophila =

Scientific classification
- Kingdom: Plantae
- Clade: Tracheophytes
- Clade: Angiosperms
- Clade: Monocots
- Clade: Commelinids
- Order: Poales
- Family: Poaceae
- Subfamily: Chloridoideae
- Genus: Muhlenbergia
- Species: M. orophila

Binomial name
- Muhlenbergia orophila Swallen

Synonyms
- Muhlenbergia matudae Sohns

Species of grass

Muhlenbergia orophila is a North American grass species native to Guatemala and to Mexico as far north as Mexico City. The type specimen was collected from an alpine meadow at an elevation of approximately 3750 m (12,500 feet) near the summit of Sierra de los Cuchumatanes, a remote mountainous area in the Huehuetenango Department in the western part of Guatemala.

Muhlenbergia orophila is a perennial herb growing in clumps. Stems can reach up to 25 cm (10 inches) tall. Sheaths are longer than the internodes. Leaves are long and narrow, up to 8 cm (3.2 inches) long and 1.5 mm (0.06 inches) wide. Spikelets are born in paniculate arrays up to 8 cm (3.2 inches) long partly enclosed in the subtending sheath, each spike dark purple and up to 3.5 mm (0.14 inches) long not including the awn that can be up to 1 mm (0.04 inches) long.
