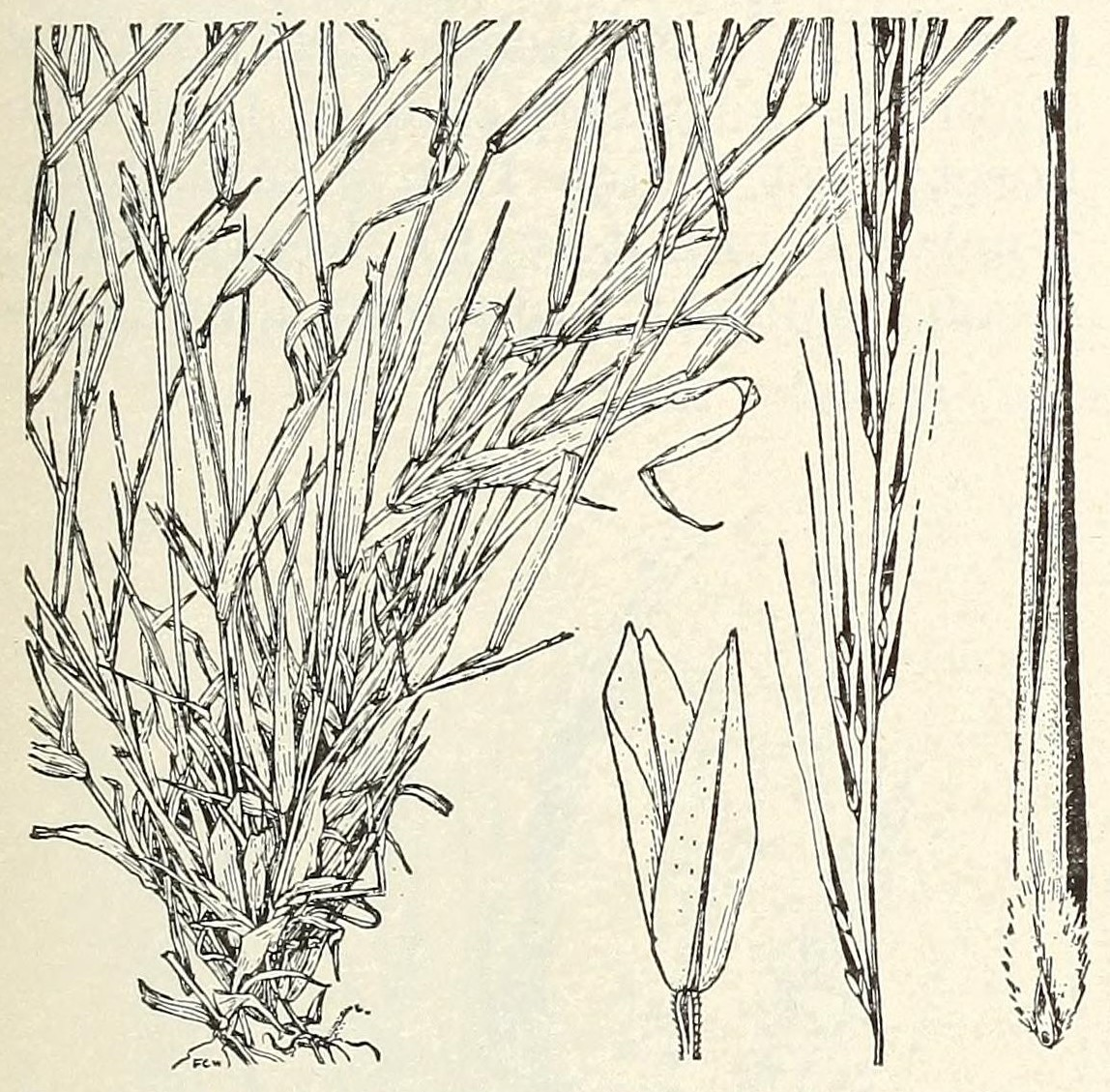

Conservation status
- Apparently Secure (NatureServe)

Scientific classification
- Kingdom: Plantae
- Clade: Tracheophytes
- Clade: Angiosperms
- Clade: Monocots
- Clade: Commelinids
- Order: Poales
- Family: Poaceae
- Subfamily: Chloridoideae
- Genus: Muhlenbergia
- Species: M. appressa

Binomial name
- Muhlenbergia appressa C.O.Goodd.

= Muhlenbergia appressa =

Species of flowering plant

Muhlenbergia appressa, the Devil's Canyon muhly, is a North American species of grass. It is native to the desert region where California and Arizona border Baja California. Muhlenbergia appressa has also been collected on San Clemente Island, one of the Channel Islands of California, in the chaparral and woodlands habitat..

Muhlenbergia appressa is an annual grass growing up to about 40 centimeters tall. The inflorescence is very narrow, with short, appressed branches. The spikelets have awns up to 3 centimeters long. Spikelets low on the inflorescence often stay wrapped in sheaths and do not bloom.
