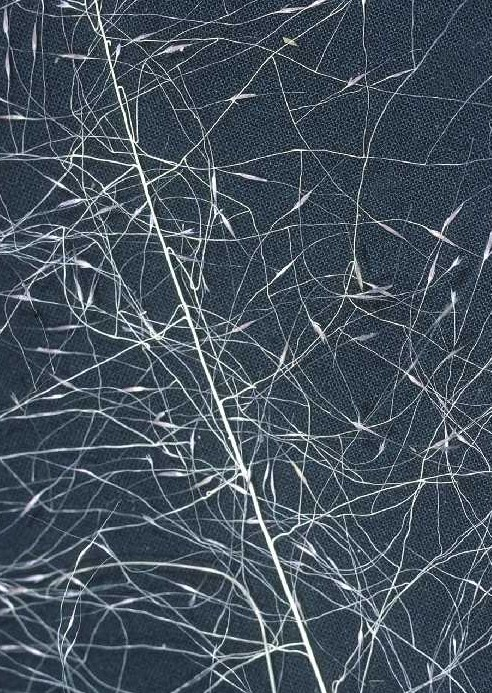

Conservation status
- Apparently Secure (NatureServe)

Scientific classification
- Kingdom: Plantae
- Clade: Tracheophytes
- Clade: Angiosperms
- Clade: Monocots
- Clade: Commelinids
- Order: Poales
- Family: Poaceae
- Subfamily: Chloridoideae
- Genus: Muhlenbergia
- Species: M. californica

Binomial name
- Muhlenbergia californica Vasey

= Muhlenbergia californica =

Species of flowering plant

Muhlenbergia californica is an uncommon North Americann species of grass known by the common name California muhly.

== Description ==
Muhlenbergia californica is a rhizomatous perennial grass growing 30 to 70 centimeters tall. The inflorescence is a narrow array of thin branches bearing many tiny pointed or awned hairy spikelets, each a few millimeters long.

== Distribution ==
It is endemic to California Transverse Ranges, where it is known only from the San Bernardino Mountains in Southern California.

It grows in moist habitat, such as streambanks and ditches, in the chaparral and woodlands.
