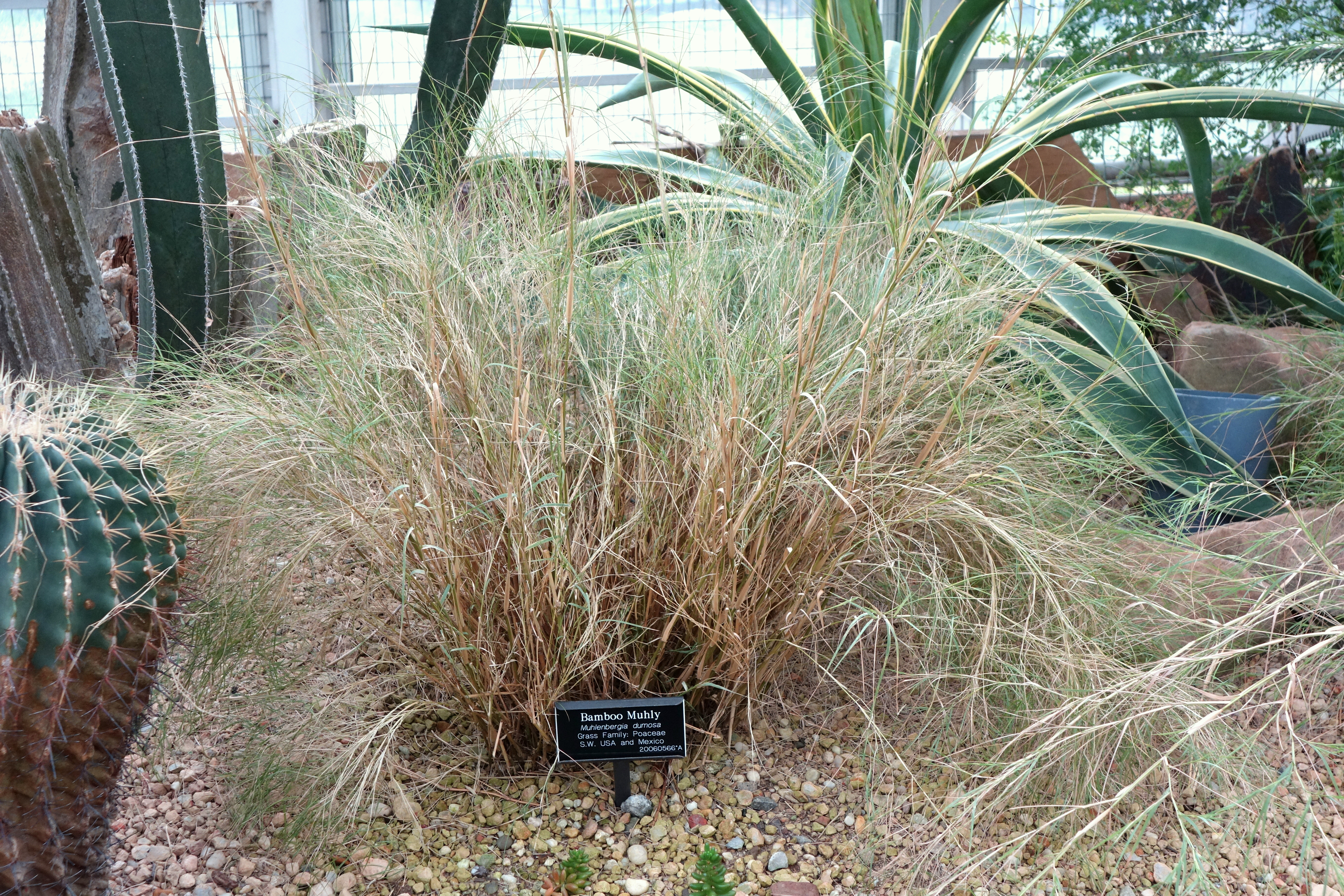

Conservation status
- Vulnerable (NatureServe)

Scientific classification
- Kingdom: Plantae
- Clade: Tracheophytes
- Clade: Angiosperms
- Clade: Monocots
- Clade: Commelinids
- Order: Poales
- Family: Poaceae
- Subfamily: Chloridoideae
- Genus: Muhlenbergia
- Species: M. dumosa

Binomial name
- Muhlenbergia dumosa Scribn. ex Vasey

= Muhlenbergia dumosa =

Species of plant

Muhlenbergia dumosa, commonly known as the bamboo muhly, is a North American species of grass native to Arizona and California.
