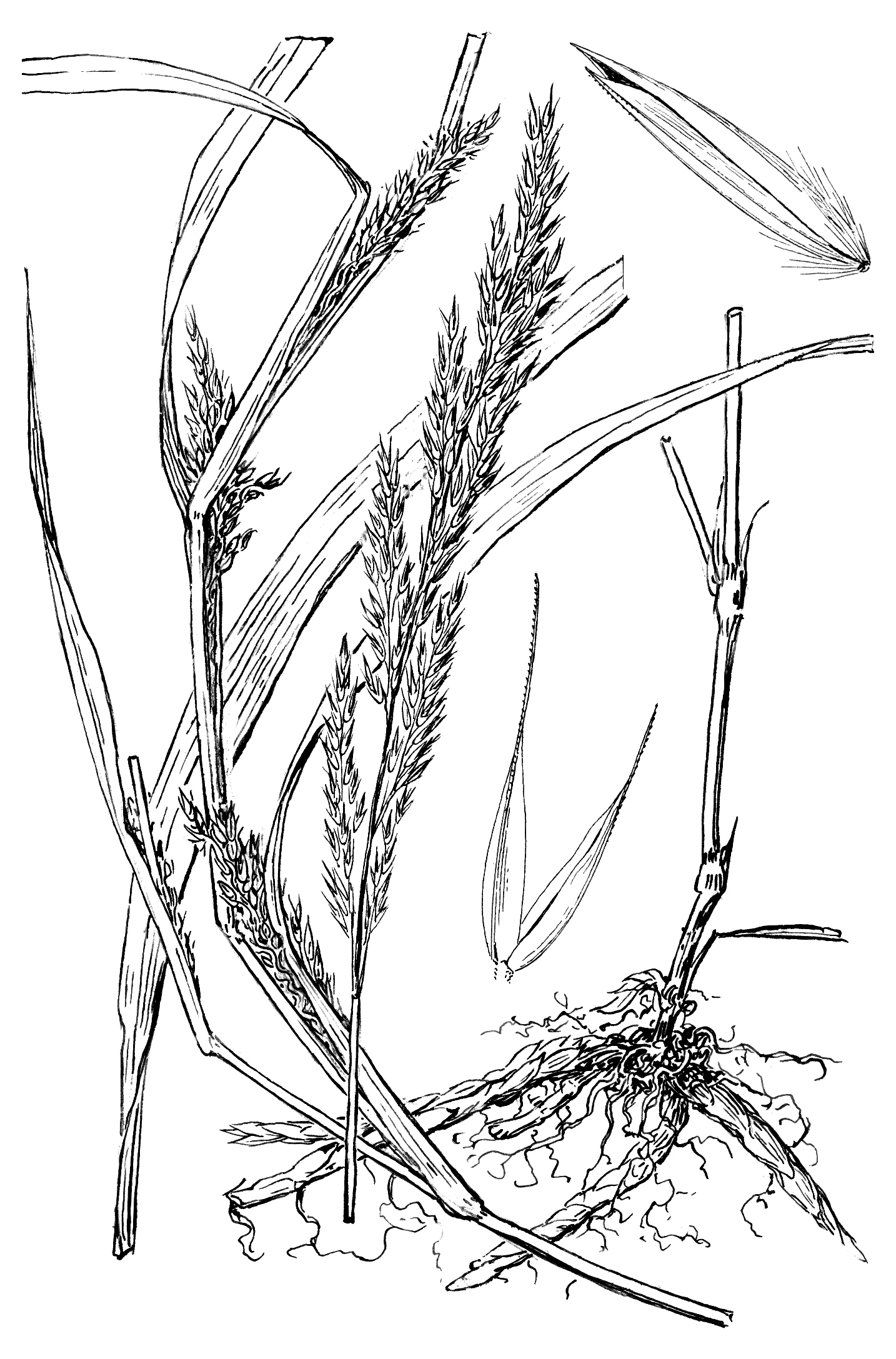
- Illustration of Muhlenbergia frondosa

Conservation status
- Secure (NatureServe)

Scientific classification
- Kingdom: Plantae
- Clade: Tracheophytes
- Clade: Angiosperms
- Clade: Monocots
- Clade: Commelinids
- Order: Poales
- Family: Poaceae
- Subfamily: Chloridoideae
- Genus: Muhlenbergia
- Species: M. frondosa

Binomial name
- Muhlenbergia frondosa (Poir.) Fernald

= Muhlenbergia frondosa =

Grass species known as common satin grass, wirestem muhly

Muhlenbergia frondosa is a species of North American plant in the genus Muhlenbergia and a member of the grass family. Its common name is common satin grass or wirestem muhly. It is informally grouped with other satin grasses, which are other species in Muhlenbergia. It is a warm-season C4-photosynthetic grass.

== Taxonomy ==
Muhlenbergia frondosa is a member of the genus Muhlenbergia. It is a flowering plant, monocot, and a member of the grass family Poaceae.

The genus Muhlenbergia was named after the German-educated Lutheran minister and botanist Gotthilf Heinrich Ernst Muhlenberg, who classified and named 150 species of plants in his 1785 work Index Flora Lancastriensis.

Synonyms of M. frondosa include Agrostis frondosa Poir. and Muhlenbergia commutata (Scribn.) Bush.

== Description ==
This is a perennial grass growing about 1.5–3.5 feet (0.5–1.1 m), forming short, lateral branches along the central culm. It usually sprawls across the ground or onto neighboring vegetation.

It has a yellow bloom, which in Texas, occurs from March to May. In Illinois, however, the blooming period occurs during late summer to autumn, lasting around 1-3 weeks for one colony of plants. The florets are cross-pollinated by the wind.

Florets drop individually leaving behind the glumes. The fruit (grains) are 1.6-1.9 mm long, from amber to brown.

=== Distribution ===
Muhlenbergia frondosa occurs in most of the central and eastern United States. It naturally inhabits moist to wet forest margins and openings, freshwater littoral habitats, and grasslands. It is invasive in some parts of Canada.

== Ecology ==
According to Illinois Wildflowers, M. frondosa is associated with a variety of animals that feed on or use it as refuge. It is preyed on by insects from dipterans to true bugs. Larvae of a gall fly, Astictoneura agrostis, form scaly galls on this plant. Other larvae that feed on this grass include that of gall wasp (Eurytomocharis muhlenbergiae), grass fly (Homaluroides ingratus), and stink bug (Hymenarcys nervosa). Adult insects feeding on the grass include leafhoppers (Plesiommata tripunctata and Flexamia imputans), and aphids (Schizaphis muhlenbergia and Anoecia cornicola). Additionally, the seeds are probably eaten by birds, and the grass is grazed by cattle and other ungulates. M. frondosa grows in dense clusters, which provide cover for small fauna such as rodents, reptiles, and arthropods.

== Management ==
This grass can be weedy and invasive. It can infest crops of corn and soybean reducing yields in southern Canada and the Midwest to Northeastern United States. It is comparatively shade tolerant, can regrow from rhizomes, and produces abundant seeds. However it is controllable with herbicides, best timed for active growth stages 10–30 centimetres (3.9–11.8 in)

Though it can spread to places where it is unwanted, it is not very aggressive and is slow to develop.
