= Carl Bernhard von Trinius =

German botanist and physician (1778–1844)

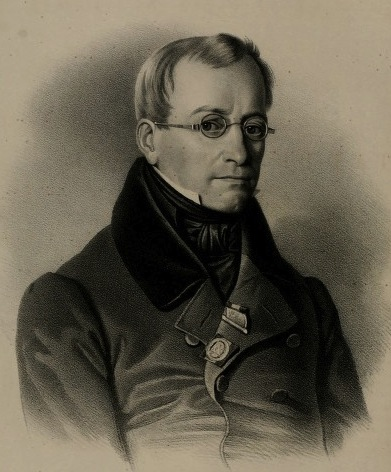
- Born: April 6, 1778
- Died: March 12, 1844 (aged 65); St. Petersburg, Russia
- Scientific career
- Fields: Botany

Carl Bernhard von Trinius (6 March 1778, Eisleben – 12 March 1844, St. Petersburg) was a German-born botanist and medical doctor.

== Career ==
He studied medicine at several universities, earning his medical doctorate at the University of Göttingen in 1802. In 1808, after time spent as a physician in Hasenpoth, he served as a personal physician to Antoinette, Duchess of Württemberg (née Princess of Saxe-Coburg-Saalfeld) for the next 16 years. During this time period, he traveled extensively throughout Germany and Russia. In St. Petersburg, he became good friends to author Ernst Moritz Arndt. With Joseph Liboschitz, he edited the exsiccata Description des Mousses qui croissent aux environs de St. Pétersbourg et de Moscou (1811). After the death of the duchess in 1824, he remained in St. Petersburg as an imperial physician, and along with a medical practice, he dealt with botanical concerns at the Academy of Sciences.

From 1829 to 1833, he taught classes in natural sciences to the future Russian emperor, Alexander II. In 1836–1838, he took an extended scientific journey to Berlin, Leipzig, Halle, Vienna, Munich, and Dresden, a trip in which he studied various botanical collections.

As a physician, he is known for his homeopathic approach to medicine (especially after 1830). As a botanist, Trinius was a specialist in grasses and described many species in his career, including Agrostis pallens, Cenchrus agrimonioides and Festuca subulata. The genus Trinia and species Trinia glauca are named after him. The so-called "Herbarium Trinii" (a collection of roughly 4000-5000 plants) was bequeathed to the botanical museum in St. Petersburg.

He was the author of numerous papers in the field of botany. Among his better known publications was "Species graminum, iconibus et descriptionibus illustr." (Vol. I, 1828; Vol. II, 1829; Vol. III, 1836). After his death, a collection of Trinius' poetry was published as Gedichte ("Poems", Berlin 1848).

== Sources ==
- "Триниус, Карл-Бернгард Антонович" . Brockhaus and Efron Encyclopedic Dictionary (in Russian). 1906.
- Karl Antonovich (Carl Bernhard) von Trinius on the Russian Academy of Sciences site.
