= A. S. Hitchcock =

American botanist and agrostologist

A.S. Hitchcock
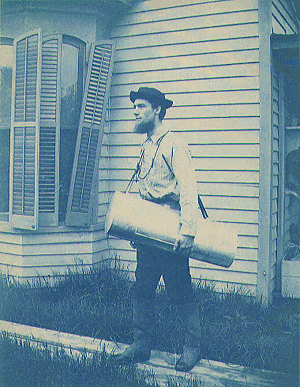
- A. S. Hitchcock in 1888.
- Born: September 4, 1865
- Died: December 16, 1935 (aged 70)
- Education: Iowa Agricultural College
- Occupations: Botanist, agrostologist
- Employer: USDA
- Notable work: Hitchcock-Chase Collection

Albert Spear Hitchcock (September 4, 1865 – December 16, 1935) was an American botanist and agrostologist.

== Biography ==
Hitchcock graduated from the Iowa Agricultural College (now Iowa State University) with bachelor's degree in 1884 and M.S. in 1886. From 1892 to 1901 he was a professor of botany at the Kansas State Agricultural College.

Hitchcock joined the USDA in 1901 as Assistant Agrostologist under Frank Lamson-Scribner. In 1905 he was put in charge of the grass herbarium and became Systematic Agrostologist. After 1928, he held the title of Principal Biologist in charge of Systematic Agrostology of the Department of Agriculture and kept that title until his death in 1935. In 1912 he became Custodian of Grasses, Division of Plants, United States National Museum. Hitchcock remained Custodian without remuneration until his death. His field notebooks are archived in the Smithsonian Institution.

He was a professor of botany in the Kansas State Agricultural College and authored over 250 works during his lifetime.

== Works ==
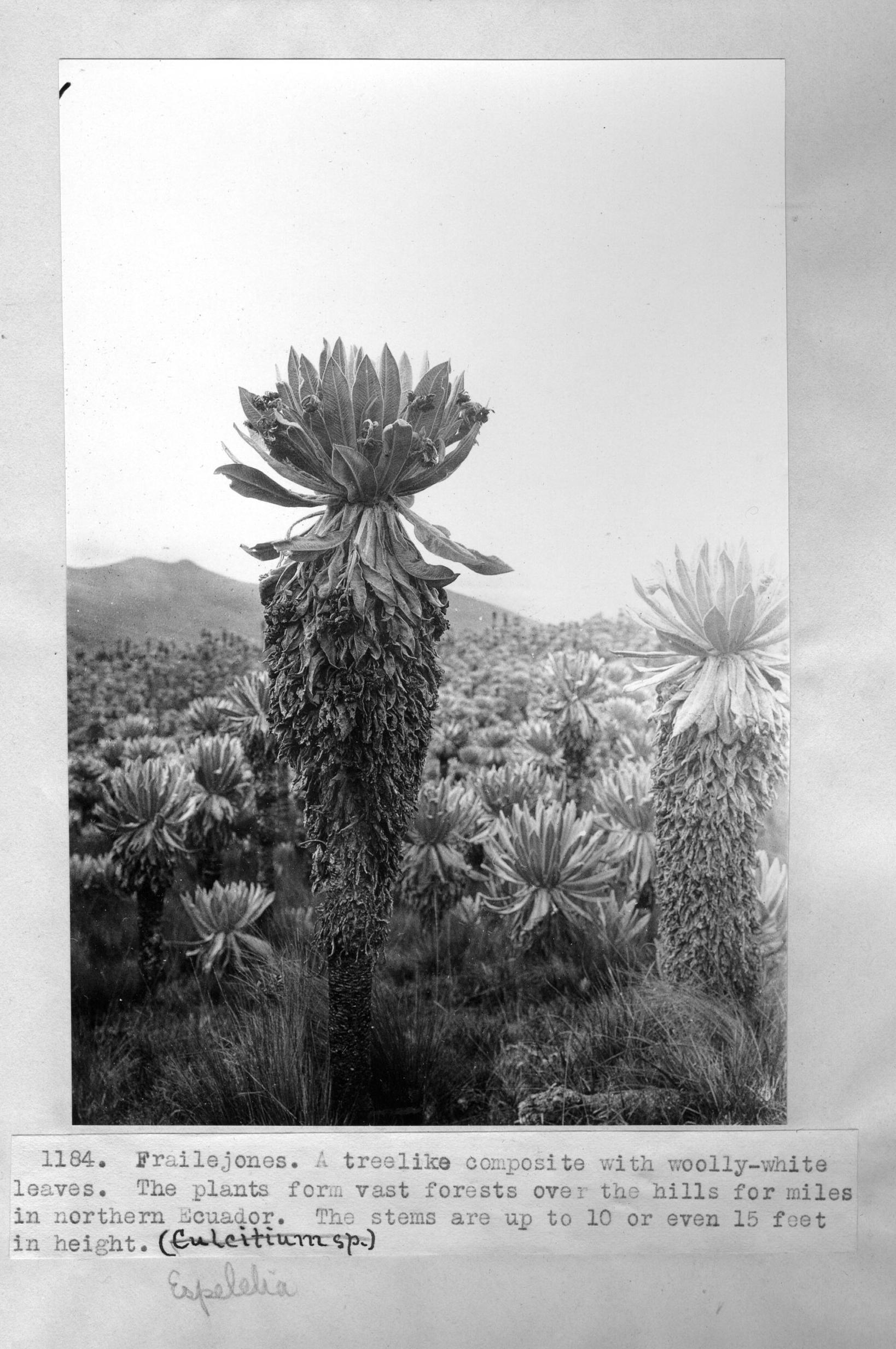
A frailejones in Ecuador as photographed by Hitchcock, c. 1923–1924.

The Hitchcock-Chase Collection consists of 2,707 drawings (mostly ink, but some pencil) of grasses, representing hundreds of genera, that were assembled by the Smithsonian Institution agrostologists Albert Spear Hitchcock (1865–1935) and Mary Agnes Chase (1869–1963). The collection is on indefinite loan to Hunt Institute from the Smithsonian.

Hitchcock edited and distributed two exsiccatae, namely Plants of Kansas and American grasses.

== Publications ==
- Manual of the Grasses of the West Indies – Miscellaneous Publication #243, United States Department of Agriculture, Washington DC (1936)
- Manual of the grasses of the United States – Miscellaneous Publication #200, United States Department of Agriculture, Washington DC (1935)
- A Manual of Farm Grasses (1921)
- A.S. Hitchcock Field Books, a set on Flickr
