= Zenkeria =

Zenkeria may refer to:

- Zenkeria (plant), a genus of plants in the tribe Molinieae,
- Zenkeria (bug), a genus of bugs in the tribe Petascelini.
