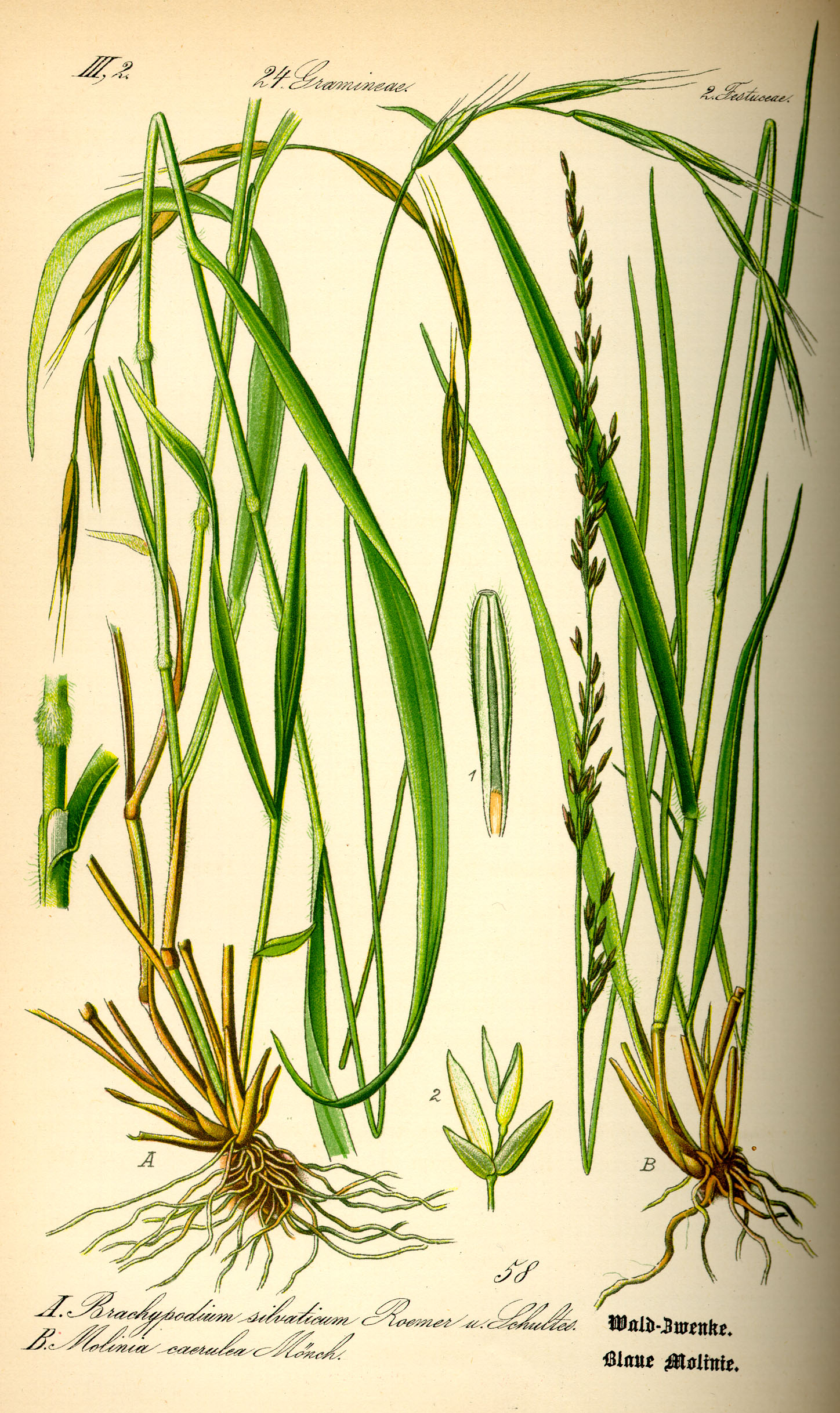
- Molinia caerulea (right)

Scientific classification
- Kingdom: Plantae
- Clade: Tracheophytes
- Clade: Angiosperms
- Clade: Monocots
- Clade: Commelinids
- Order: Poales
- Family: Poaceae
- Subfamily: Arundinoideae
- Tribe: Molinieae
- Subtribe: Moliniinae
- Genus: Molinia; Schrank

Type species
- Molinia varia Schrank

Synonyms
- Monilia A.Gray; Enodium Pers. ex Gaudin; Graphephorum Honda 1934, illegitimate homonym not Desv. 1810

= Molinia =

Genus of grasses

Molinia, or moor grass, is a genus of two species of flowering plants in the grass family, native to damp moorland in Eurasia and northern Africa. They are both herbaceous perennial grasses.

The genus is named after Juan Ignacio Molina, a 19th-century Chilean naturalist.

Species

- Molinia caerulea (L.) Moench - (purple moor grass) - Eurasia + northern Africa from Ireland + Morocco to Ethiopia + Kazakhstan; naturalized in parts of United States + Canada
- Molinia arundinacea (Schrank) - Native from Georgia to Scotland, primary grows in and around the Alps

formerly included

see Arctophila Catabrosa Cleistogenes Diarrhena Disakisperma Festuca Glyceria Poa Puccinellia Moliniopsis

- Molinia aquatica - Catabrosa aquatica
- Molinia distans - Puccinellia distans
- Molinia distans var. reptans - Puccinellia maritima
- Molinia fauriei - Diarrhena fauriei
- Molinia fluitans - Glyceria fluitans
- Molinia japonica - Moliniopsis japonica
- Molinia maritima - Puccinellia maritima
- Molinia maxima - Glyceria maxima
- Molinia olgae - Festuca olgae
- Molinia pendulina - Arctophila fulva
- Molinia plicata - Glyceria fluitans
- Molinia remota - Poa remota
- Molinia retusa - Disakisperma dubium
- Molinia serotina - Cleistogenes serotina
- Molinia spiculosa - Glyceria spiculosa
- Molinia squarrosa - Cleistogenes squarrosa
