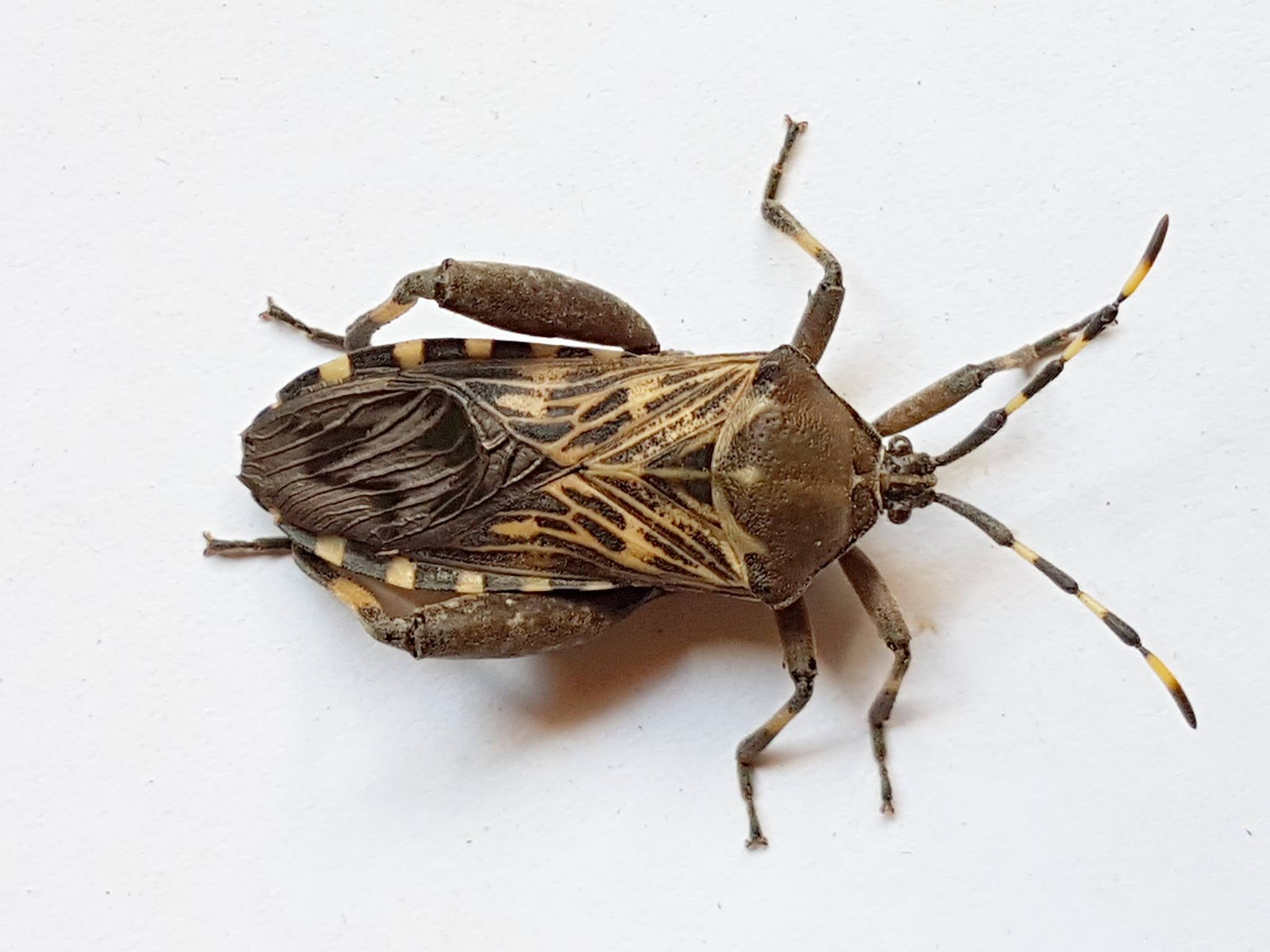

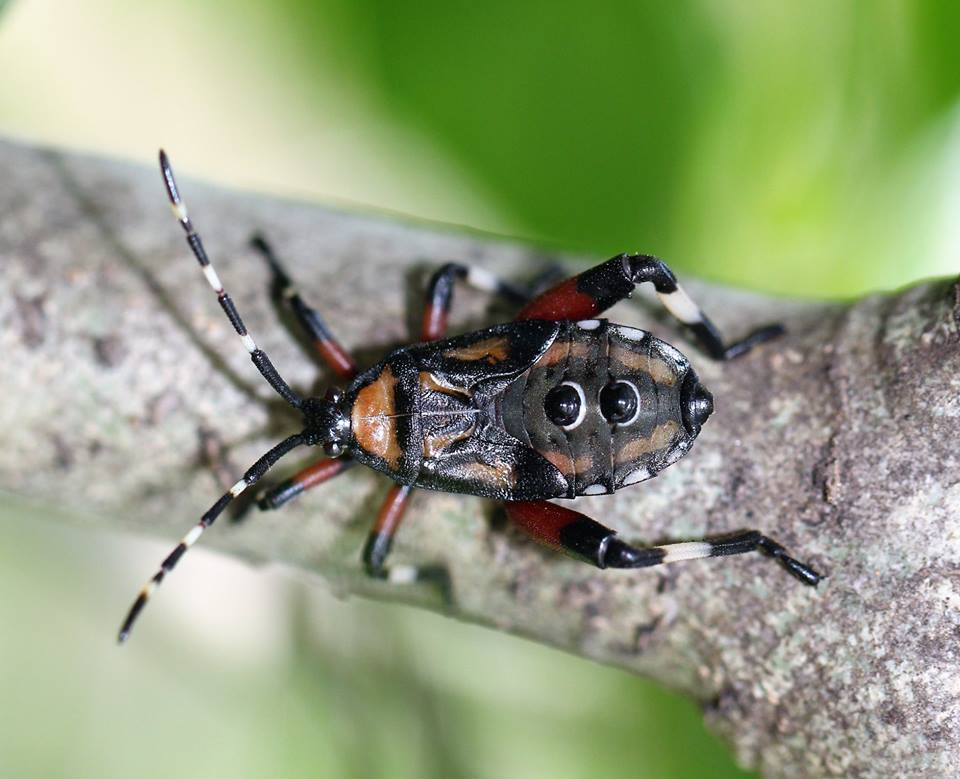
- adult and nymph

Scientific classification
- Kingdom: Animalia
- Phylum: Arthropoda
- Class: Insecta
- Order: Hemiptera
- Suborder: Heteroptera
- Family: Coreidae
- Subfamily: Coreinae
- Tribe: Petascelini
- Genus: Carlisis
- Species: C. wahlbergi

Binomial name
- Carlisis wahlbergi Carl Stål, 1858

= Carlisis wahlbergi =

Species of true bug

Carlisis wahlbergi (Stål, 1858) aka the Gardenia twig wilter is a Central and Southern African species of Coreidae in the order Hemiptera. The species was first described by Carl Stål, the Swedish authority on Hemiptera, and based on a specimen collected by the Swedish naturalist Johan August Wahlberg at Lake Ngami in Bechuanaland.

The species shows a marked preference for the sap of Gardenia thunbergia and Gardenia volkensii, and its nymphs possess powerfully offensive scent glands to discourage predation or interference. This defensive secretion has been analysed and found to consist largely of acetic acid (66%), trans-2-hexenal (17%) and 3-hydroxybutanal (14%). Even so the adults are eaten in Zimbabwe. Nymphs of various Coreids secrete alarm pheromones from the dorsal abdominal glands.

== Species ==
The genus Carlisis comprises 4 species:

- Carlisis myrmecophilus Linnavuori, 1978 — Northeast Tropical Africa
- Carlisis serrabilis Distant, 1904 — Transvaal, South Africa
- Carlisis stuhlmanni Karsch, 1895 — Democratic Republic of the Congo
- Carlisis wahlbergi Stål, 1858 — Southern Africa
