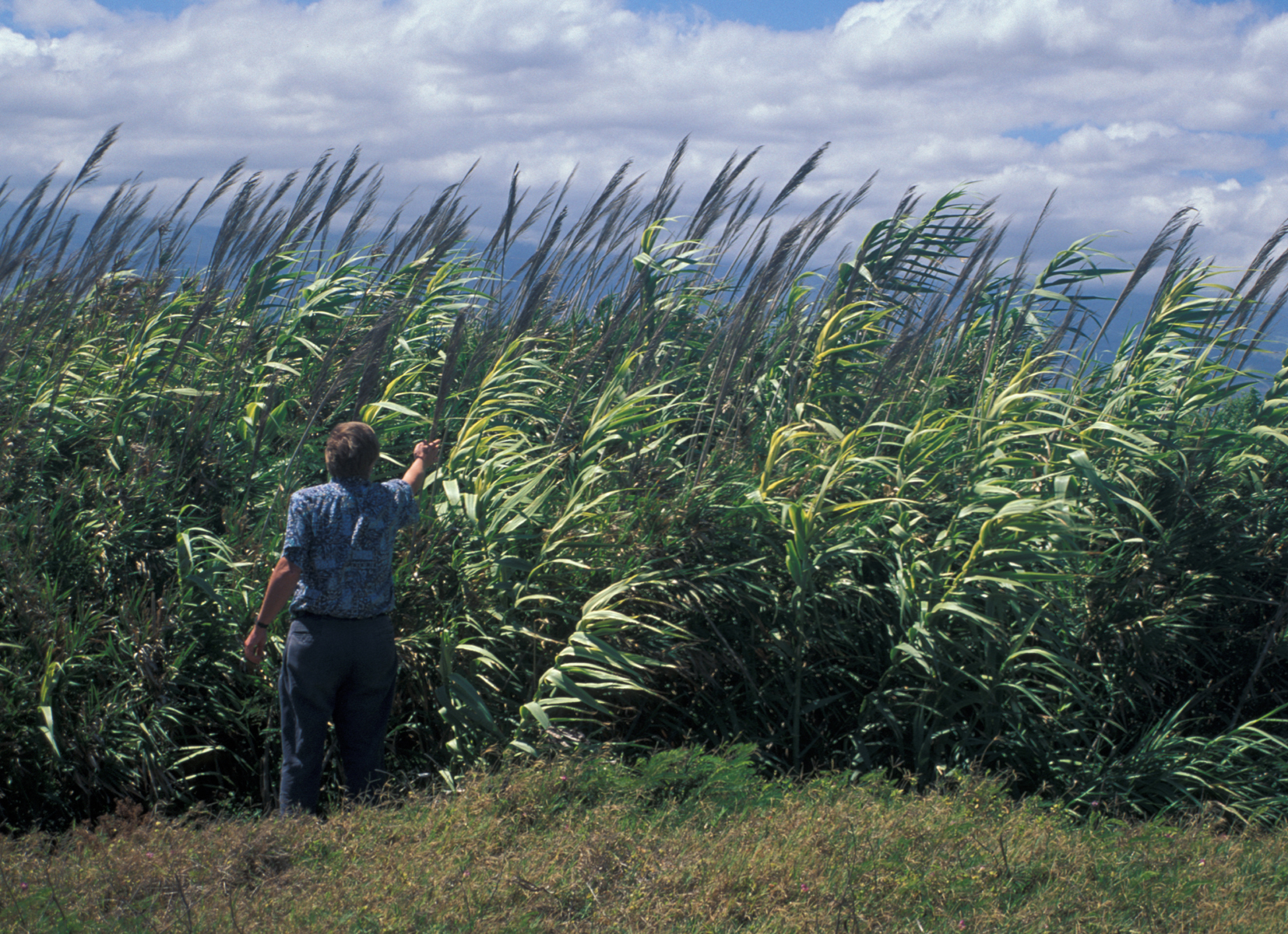
- Arundo donax

Scientific classification
- Kingdom: Plantae
- Clade: Tracheophytes
- Clade: Angiosperms
- Clade: Monocots
- Clade: Commelinids
- Order: Poales
- Family: Poaceae
- Clade: PACMAD clade
- Subfamily: Arundinoideae; Kunth ex Beilschm. (1833)

Genera
- 16 genera, see text

Synonyms
- Arundinoideae Tateoka (1957, isonym); Phragmitoideae Parodi (1958, nom. inval.); Phragmitoideae Parodi ex Caro (1982); Arundinaceae Burmeist. (1837, unranked)

= Arundinoideae =

Arundinoideae Temporal range: Campanian–Recent

Subfamily of plants

The Arundinoideae are a subfamily of the true grass family Poaceae with around 40 species, including giant reed and common reed. Unlike many other members of the PACMAD clade of grasses, the Arundinoideae all use C_{3} photosynthesis. Their sister group is the subfamily Micrairoideae.

Arundinoideae used to be quite large in older taxonomic systems, with over 700 species, but most of them have been moved to other subfamilies following phylogenetic analyses. Currently, species are placed in 16 genera and two tribes.

== Tribes and genera ==
Arundineae

- Amphipogon (syn. Diplopogon)
- Arundo
- Dregeochloa
- Monachather

Molinieae
Subtribe Crinipinae

- Crinipes
- Elytrophorus
- Pratochloa
- Styppeiochloa

Subtribe Moliniinae

- Hakonechloa
- Molinia
- Moliniopsis
- Phragmites

incertae sedis

Leptagrostis
Piptophyllum
Zenkeria
