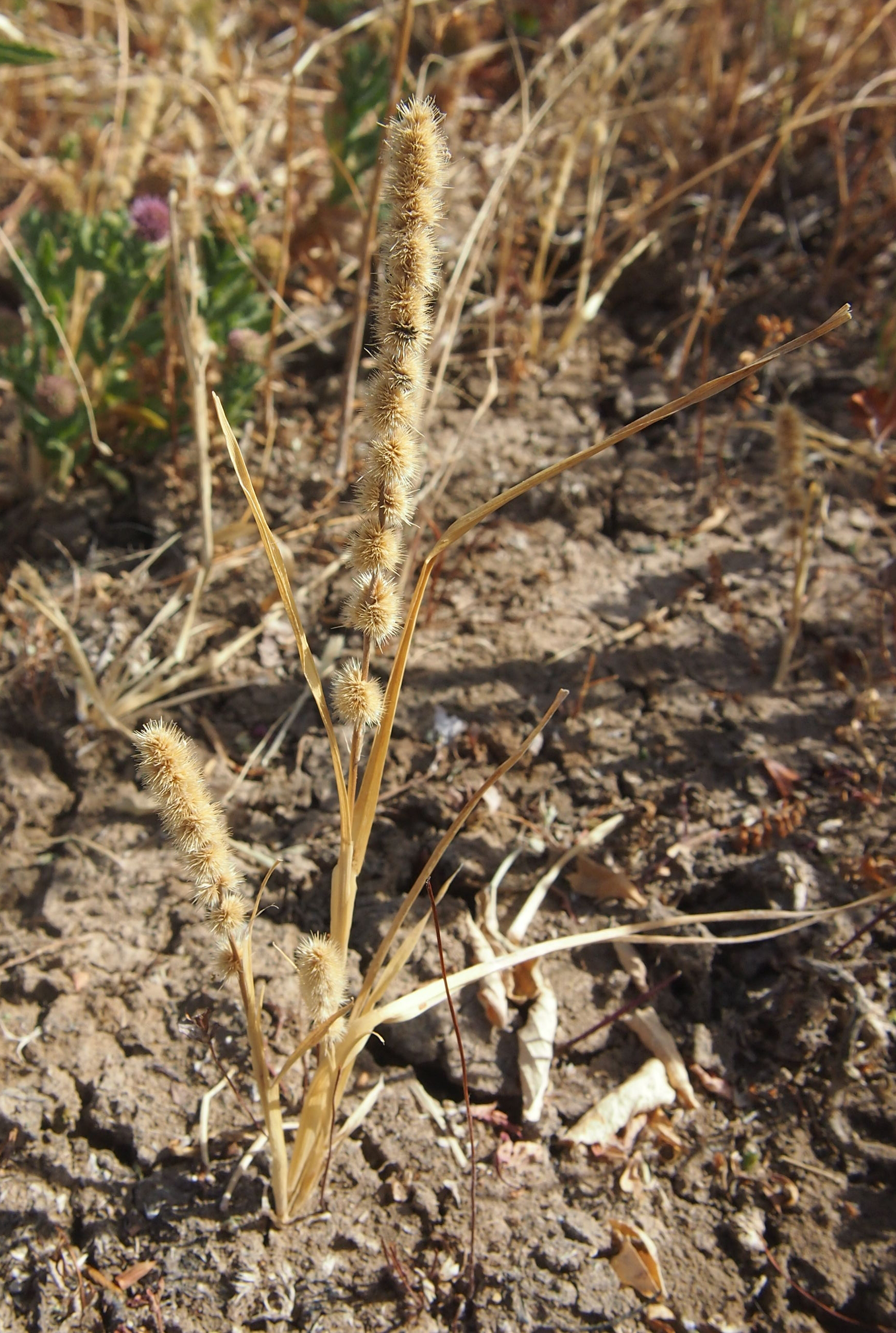

Scientific classification
- Kingdom: Plantae
- Clade: Tracheophytes
- Clade: Angiosperms
- Clade: Monocots
- Clade: Commelinids
- Order: Poales
- Family: Poaceae
- Genus: Elytrophorus
- Species: E. spicatus

Binomial name
- Elytrophorus spicatus (Willd.) A.Camus
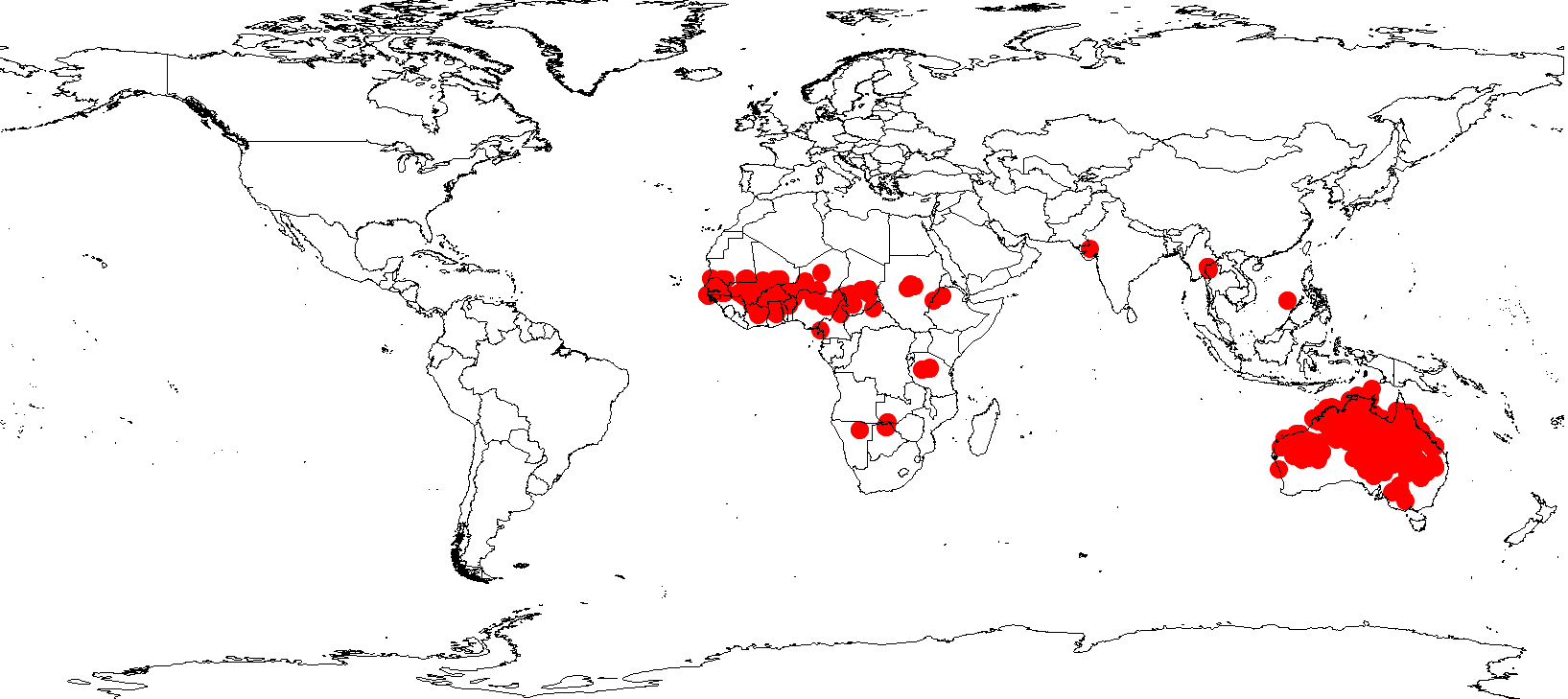
- Occurrence data from GBIF

Synonyms
- Dactylis spicata Willd. Echinalysium articulatum (P.Beauv.) Kunth; Echinalysium strictum Trin. Elytrophorus articulatus P.Beauv. Phleum glomeruliflorum Steud. Sesleria spicata (Willd.) Spreng.

= Elytrophorus spicatus =

Species of plant

Elytrophorus spicatus (common name spikegrass) is a small plant in the Poaceae family native to Africa, the Indian subcontinent, south-east Asia and Australia.

== Description ==
Elytrophorus spicatus is a tufted, annual or perennial plant with bristly culms. The leaves are loosely sheathed, and the blades are rolled in bud. The inflorescence spike (length of up to 26 cm by 5–9 mm wide) consists of globular clusters of spikelets, which are 4 mm long, with bisexual florets. The glumes are shortly awned, about 2 to 3 mm long, and have translucent margins translucent which are sparingly fringed with hairs. The awn and keel are rough. The plant flowers in response to flooding or rain.

== Distribution ==
It is native to Bangladesh, Benin, Botswana, Burkina, Cameroon, Chad, China, East Himalaya, Eritrea, Ethiopia, Ghana, Guinea-Bissau, Hainan, India, Ivory Coast, Lesser Sunda Is., Mali, Mauritania, Myanmar, Namibia, Nepal, Australia, Niger, Nigeria, Senegal, South Australia, Sri Lanka, Sudan, Tanzania, Thailand, Togo, Vietnam, Himalaya, Zambia, and Zimbabwe.

== Habitat ==
It is found in damp soil along creeks, in damp hollows, in seepages, and in and near water.

== Taxonomy ==
It was first described as Dactylis spicata by Carl Ludwig Willdenow in 1801. It was assigned to the genus, Elytrophorus, by Aimée Antoinette Camus in 1923.
