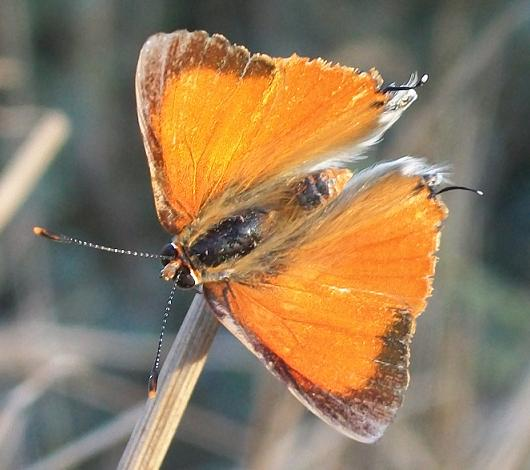
- Male in Amanzimtoti, South Africa
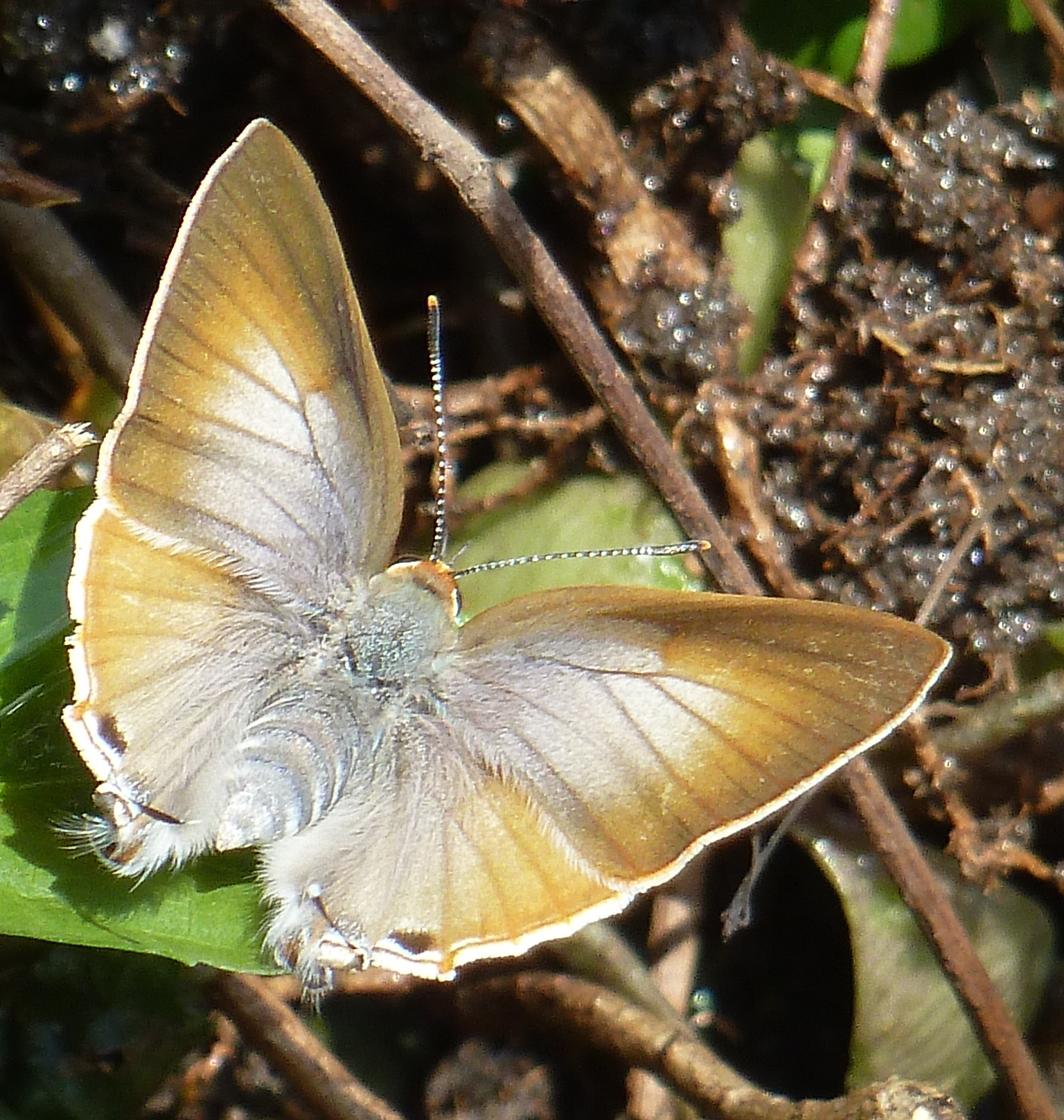
- Female in Pretoria, South Africa

Scientific classification
- Kingdom: Animalia
- Phylum: Arthropoda
- Class: Insecta
- Order: Lepidoptera
- Family: Lycaenidae
- Genus: Deudorix
- Species: D. dinochares

Binomial name
- Deudorix dinochares Grose-Smith, 1887

Synonyms
- Virachola dinochares; Deudorix (Virachola) dinochares; Deudorix dieden Karsch, 1900; Deudorix dinochares var. rhodesiensis Stevenson, 1937

= Deudorix dinochares =

Apricot playboy

Species of butterfly

Deudorix dinochares, the apricot playboy, is a butterfly of the family Lycaenidae. It is found in South Africa, Madagascar, Zimbabwe, eastern Africa and south-west Arabia. In South Africa it is found from northern KwaZulu-Natal to Eswatini, Mpumalanga, Limpopo, North West and Gauteng.

The wingspan is 24–30 mm for males and 26–32 mm for females. Adults are on the wing year-round with peaks from September to October and from March to May.

The larvae feed on the fruit of a wide range of plants such as: Combretum species (including C. zeyheri), Burkea species (including B. africana), Syzygium species (including S. cordatum), Gardenia species (including G. volkensii and G. neuberia), Pseudolachnostylis maprouneifolia, Acacia species (including A. stenocarpa), Dolichos, Lablab, Schotea, Macadamia, Coffea, Quisqualis, Schotia, Tamarindus, Vigna, Psidium, Prunus and Ximenia species.
