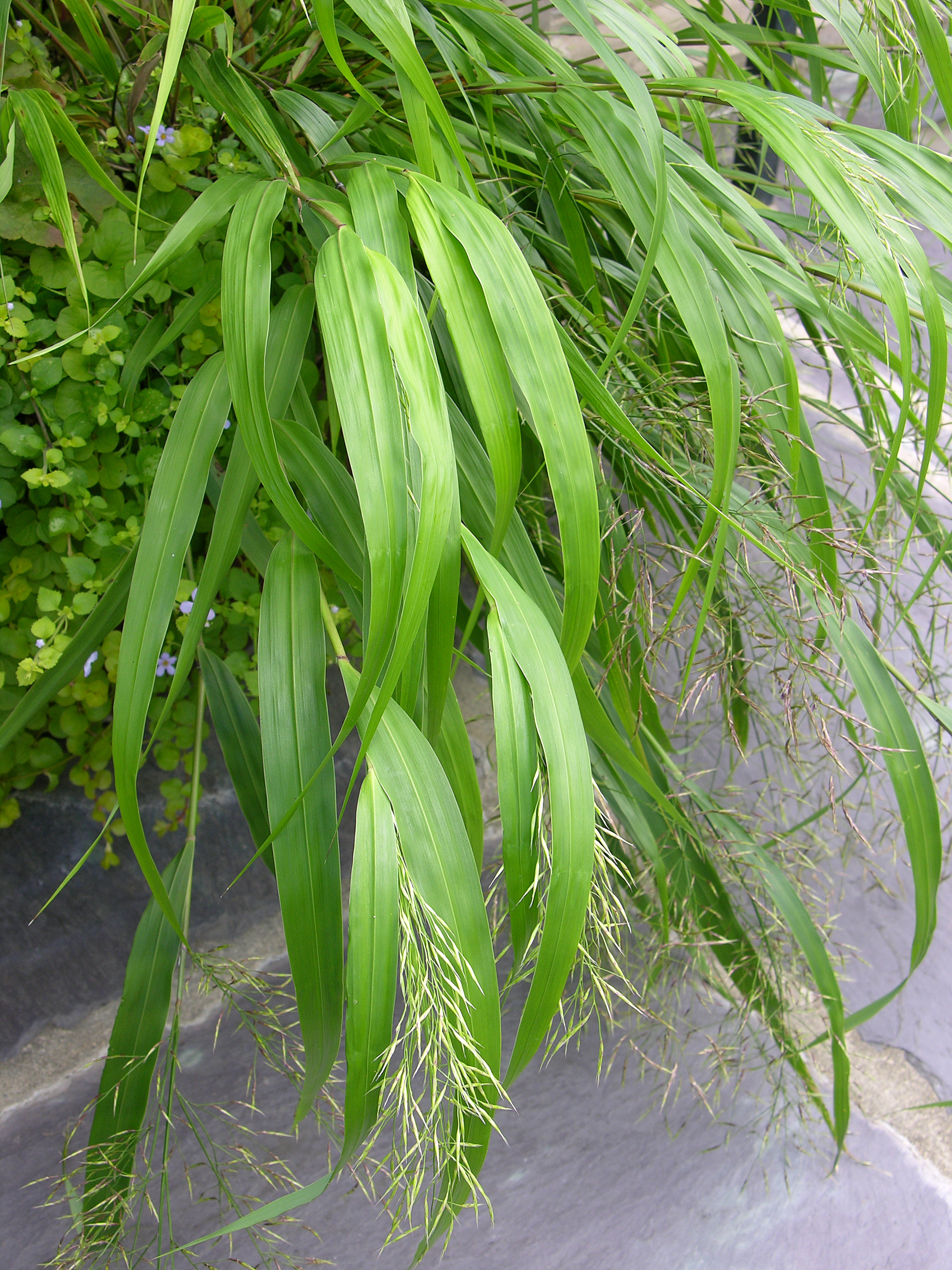
- Hakonechloa macra 'All Gold'

Scientific classification
- Kingdom: Plantae
- Clade: Tracheophytes
- Clade: Angiosperms
- Clade: Monocots
- Clade: Commelinids
- Order: Poales
- Family: Poaceae
- Subfamily: Arundinoideae
- Tribe: Molinieae
- Subtribe: Moliniinae
- Genus: Hakonechloa; Makino ex Honda
- Species: H. macra

Binomial name
- Hakonechloa macra (Makino) Honda

Synonyms
- Phragmites macer Munro; Phragmites oyyamensis Onuma; Hakonechloa macra var. aureola Makino; Hakonechloa macra var. alboaurea Makino; Hakonechloa macra var. albovariegata Makino; Hakonechloa macra f. albovariegata (Makino) Ohwi; Hakonechloa macra f. aureola (Makino) Ohwi

= Hakonechloa =

Genus of grasses

Hakonechloa is a genus of bunchgrass in the tribe Molinieae of the grass family, Poaceae, native to eastern Asia.

Hakonechloa macra, with the common names Hakone grass and Japanese forest grass, is the only species in the monotypic genus. It is endemic to Japan.

== Description ==
Hakonechloa macra is a small, mostly shade-loving, clump-forming bunchgrass, slowly spreading in circumference. The stalks cascade in a graceful rounded fountain shape somewhat reminiscent of Pennisetum (fountain grass) but with the actual leaves resembling Chasmanthium. The species tends to be between 45 cm and 60 cm (18" to 24") in height.

The leaves are thin and papery and resemble many forms of bamboo. They are very flexible and have a distinctive rustling sound when the wind blows that adds to their appeal. The foliage rises from the roots on thin wiry stalks. The leaf blades are green but many color variations exist. The papery texture keeps the foliage cool to the touch and often the surface is slightly puckered or rippled.

The flowers bloom in midsummer from leaf nodes near the ends of the stalks. The flowers are light purple fading to tan then dropping off over the course of several weeks.

== Cultivation ==
Hakonechloa macra is grown as an ornamental plant, for use in gardens and as a potted plant. The various cultivars of Hakonechloa macra are used as foliage plants in gardens in temperate climates. The species and the cultivars 'Alboaurea' and 'Aureola' have gained the Royal Horticultural Society's Award of Garden Merit.

=== Cultivars ===
The cultivars of Hakonechloa macra may be green, or boldly variegated in stripes of white, green, or yellow, or have solid colored leaves. Some cultivars tend to turn orange or red in colder weather. The cultivars often grow significantly shorter in height than the species. The height may also be somewhat dependent on soil moisture, nutrients, and length of growing season. The plant is tough enough to survive in USDA Zone 5, −28 °C (−18 °F). It prefers even moisture and average humidity, but can tolerate minor dry spells and arid climates (with irrigation) with minimal damage.

It is mainly used as an ornamental grass in Japanese style gardens, or to brighten shady areas of the garden. The graceful form tends to soften formal shady areas as well. Solid green leaves are the hallmark of the species. The green form is the fastest grower and tends to be slightly larger than most cultivars, and is mildly sun tolerant though it may burn if not given adequate shade. The foliage tends to be deep bright green and may have orange, red or purple tones to some degree in the fall.

==== Solid foliage colors ====
Solid foliage color variations include:

- Hakonechloa macra 'All Gold' This solid color variety has leaves that range from pale yellow to gold to deep lime green depending on sun exposure. The more sun the brighter the yellow tends to be. Too much sun will cause scorching. Plants in full shade will tend to be much greener and may be difficult to distinguish from other cultivars.
- Hakonechloa macra 'Beni-Kaze' The leaves of Beni-Kaze, (Japanese for Red Wind) are green throughout most of the growing season but as cool weather approaches red pigments flush into the leaves turning them bright red to reddish-purple in autumn. It averages 45 centimetres (18 in) to 75 centimetres (30 in) in height.
- Hakonechloa macra 'Nicolas' Developed in France by Olivier Bennato Chez, this cultivar is basically a dwarf version of Beni-Kaze, only reaching 15 cm (about 6") or 23 cm (9") in bloom (according to the US patent; this information is not cited by most sellers of this plant who state greater average heights). The cool season color varies from orange to red shades and is most pronounced in autumn.

==== Variegated foliage colors ====
Variegated foliage color variations include:

- Hakonechloa macra 'Aureola' This is the most common variegated cultivar. The foliage is striped bright gold and apple green, with gold predominating which may tend toward pink in autumn. Height averages between 25 centimetres (10 in) and 36 centimetres (14 in). This cultivar was the 2009 Perennial Plant Association's pick for Plant of the Year. Additionally, the Royal Horticultural Society have given this cultivar their prestigious Award of Garden Merit (AGM).
- Hakonechloa macra 'Sunny Delight' This variety is a reversal of the variegation of 'Aureola'. The majority of the leaf is green with narrow yellow stripes and jetting toward the base of the blade giving it a much darker look than 'Aureola'. Height averages 30 centimetres (12 in) to 36 centimetres (14 in). It is one of the more vigorous forms, as the variegation makes up less of the leaf area than many variegated forms.
- Hakonechloa macra 'Albostriata' This cultivar is green with cream to pure white stripes along the leaves. Foliage variegation is similar to 'Sunny Delight'. The variegation shows little to no yellow and may blush pink in spring and in autumn, though it looks mostly green from a distance. This is one of the more vigorous variegated cultivars. Height averages 30 centimetres (12 in) to 46 centimetres (18 in).
- Hakonechloa macra 'Fubuki' One of the slowest and smallest varieties available, this grass is a reverse variegation of 'Albostriata'. The foliage of 'Fubuki' (or Blizzard in Japanese) is almost completely white with sparse green stripes and jetting. Like many nearly white plants, this cultivar is not very vigorous however it can be stunning in the landscape. It will burn in high light, and prefers a cool shady location. 'Fubuki' usually maxes out at about 15 centimetres (6 in) to 25 centimetres (10 in).
- Hakonechloa macra 'Naomi' This dwarf cultivar was discovered in the same French trial gardens as 'Nicolas'. The foliage is similar to 'Aureola' with cream to yellow variegation but the fall color is deep reddish purple.
- Hakonechloa macra 'Stripe It Rich' This cultivar is a yellow and white variegated variety, essentially a variegated form of 'All Gold'. The foliage varies from lime green to yellow with white stripes and jetting. This is currently (2012) the most recently discovered cultivar. It averages about 15 centimetres (6 in) tall.

=== Propagation ===
Hakonechloa macra can be easily propagated by division. The rootball has many stalks coming up from a dense rhizomatous cluster of roots. Apparent on the rhizome are small buds that look like thorns. These are new shoots and with care they can be removed from the root cluster with a small segment of rhizome taking care to include connected roots.

When planted and properly cared for, the grass will root and spread to form a clonal selection of the grass. Horticultural tissue culture may also be utilized by propagators with the appropriate equipment.

== Etymology ==
Hakonechloa: Derived from Japanese and Greek, meaning 'Hakone grass'. Named for the Hakone hot springs region near Mount Hakone in Honshu, Japan. Macra: Derived from Greek, meaning 'big', 'large, 'long', 'deep', 'tall', or 'far'.
