= Leptagrostis =

Scientific classification
- Kingdom: Plantae
- Clade: Tracheophytes
- Clade: Angiosperms
- Clade: Monocots
- Clade: Commelinids
- Order: Poales
- Family: Poaceae
- Subfamily: Arundinoideae
- Tribe: Molinieae
- Genus: Leptagrostis; C.E.Hubb.
- Species: L. schimperiana

Binomial name
- Leptagrostis schimperiana (Hochst.) C.E.Hubb.

Synonyms
- Calamagrostis schimperiana Hochst.

Genus of grasses

Leptagrostis is a genus of bunchgrasses in the tribe Molinieae of the grass family, Poaceae, native to eastern Africa.

The only known species is Leptagrostis schimperiana. It is endemic to Ethiopia.
