= Pratochloa =

Scientific classification
- Kingdom: Plantae
- Clade: Tracheophytes
- Clade: Angiosperms
- Clade: Monocots
- Clade: Commelinids
- Order: Poales
- Family: Poaceae
- Subfamily: Arundinoideae
- Tribe: Molinieae
- Subtribe: Crinipinae
- Genus: Pratochloa; Hardion (2018)
- Species: P. walteri

Binomial name
- Pratochloa walteri (Pilg.) Hardion (2018)

Synonyms
- Eragrostis walteri Pilg. (1940)

Genus of plants

Pratochloa is a monotypic genus of flowering plants belonging to the family Poaceae. The only species is Pratochloa walteri. It is a perennial grass native range is Namibia.
