= Amphipogon setaceus =

Scientific classification
- Kingdom: Plantae
- Clade: Tracheophytes
- Clade: Angiosperms
- Clade: Monocots
- Clade: Commelinids
- Order: Poales
- Family: Poaceae
- Genus: Amphipogon
- Species: A. setaceus

Binomial name
- Amphipogon setaceus (R.Br.) T.D.Macfarl.

Synonyms
- Diplopogon setaceus R.Br.; Dipogonia setacea (R.Br.) P.Beauv.

Genus of grasses

Amphipogon setaceus is a species of flowering plant in the grass family Poaceae, native to Western Australia. It grows in seasonally wet areas, swamps, and fringing watercourses from Nannup to Albany. It flowers in spring and early summer in a greyish head of multiple spikelets. When placed in the genus Diplopogon as Diplopogon setaceus, it was the only species.

== Taxonomy ==
The species was first described by Robert Brown in 1810 as Diplopogon setaceus. It was the only species in the genus. In 2002, Terry Desmond Macfarlane transferred it to the genus Amphipogon, a placement accepted by Plants of the World Online and the Australian Plant Census as of November 2024.
