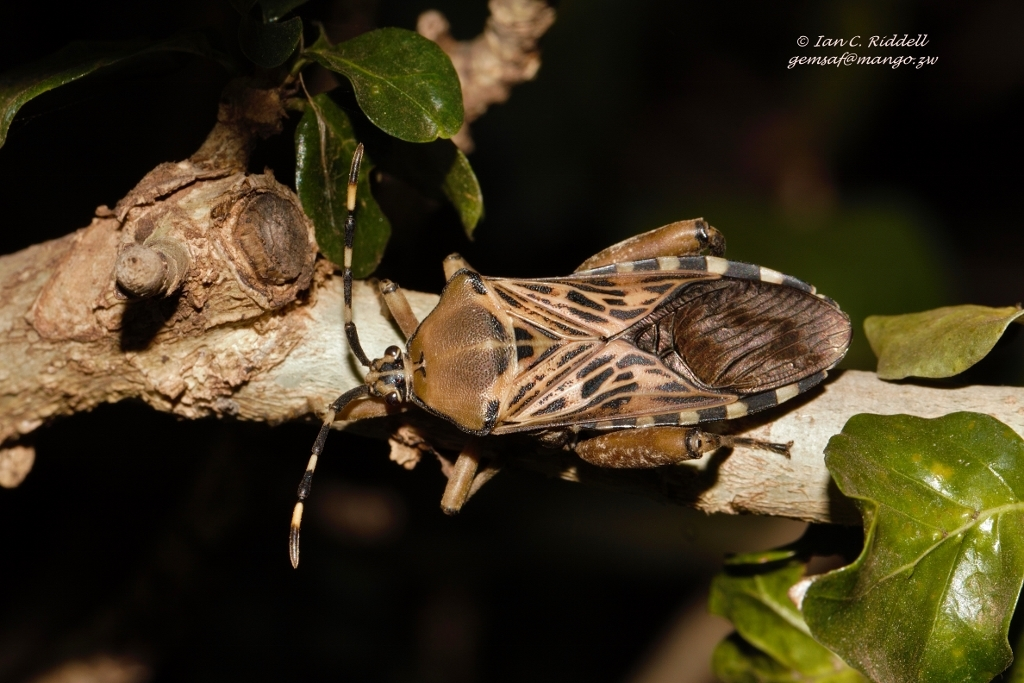
- Carlisis wahlbergi, Zimbabwe

Scientific classification
- Kingdom: Animalia
- Phylum: Arthropoda
- Clade: Pancrustacea
- Class: Insecta
- Order: Hemiptera
- Suborder: Heteroptera
- Family: Coreidae
- Subfamily: Coreinae
- Tribe: Petascelini
- Genus: Carlisis; Stål, 1858

= Carlisis =

Genus of insects

Carlisis is a genus of leaf-footed bugs in the family Coreidae. There are at least four described species in Carlisis, found in Sub-Saharan Africa.

== Species ==
These four species belong to the genus Carlisis:

- Carlisis myrmecophilus Linnavuori, 1978
- Carlisis serrabilis Distant, 1904
- Carlisis stuhlmanni Karsch, 1895
- Carlisis wahlbergi Stål, 1858
