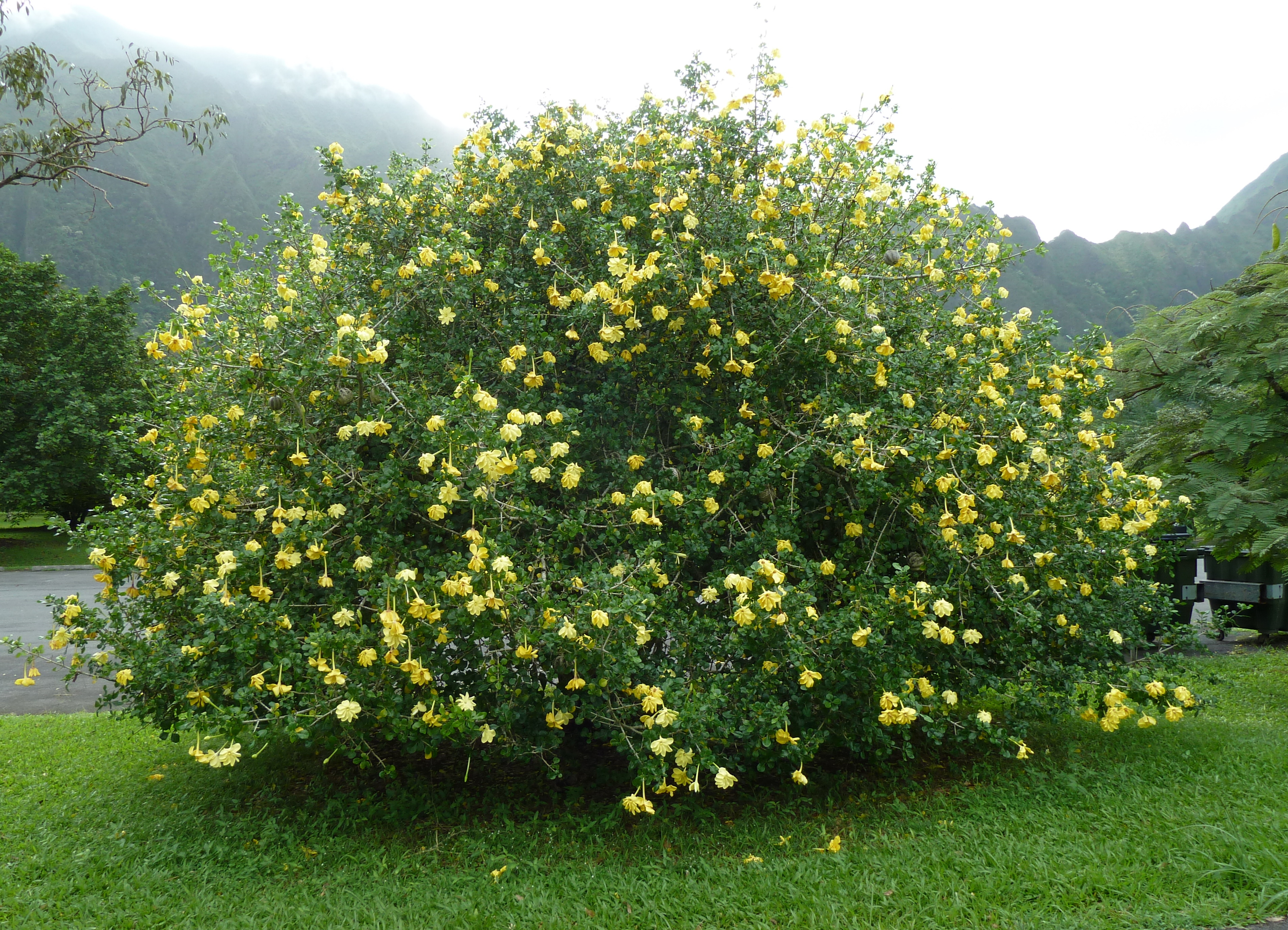

Scientific classification
- Kingdom: Plantae
- Clade: Tracheophytes
- Clade: Angiosperms
- Clade: Eudicots
- Clade: Asterids
- Order: Gentianales
- Family: Rubiaceae
- Genus: Gardenia
- Species: G. volkensii

Binomial name
- Gardenia volkensii K.Schum.

= Gardenia volkensii =

Species of plant

Gardenia volkensii, commonly known as bushveldt gardenia or Transvaal gardenia, is a species of plant in the family Rubiaceae native to southern Africa.

== Description ==
Gardenia volkensii is a multi-stemmed shrub or small tree with short, rigid branches. The branches form a dense rounded canopy and may touch the ground. The bark is a pale grey colour. Shiny spoon-shaped leaves are found clustered at the end of knobbly branchlets. The trumpet-shaped flowers start off white, but turn yellow with age. These give rise to large, round hard fruit. The ribbed outer layer is grey and is filled with an orange pulp that contains seeds.

There are two subspecies in South Africa. These can be distinguished by their fruit. Gardenia volkensii subsp. volkensii has a larger and paler fruit that is more heavily ribbed. It also has white spots called lenticels on the surface. The fruit of G. volkensii subsp. volkensii var. saundersiae is smoother, darker and smaller. G. volkensii subsp. spatulifolia is also recognised.

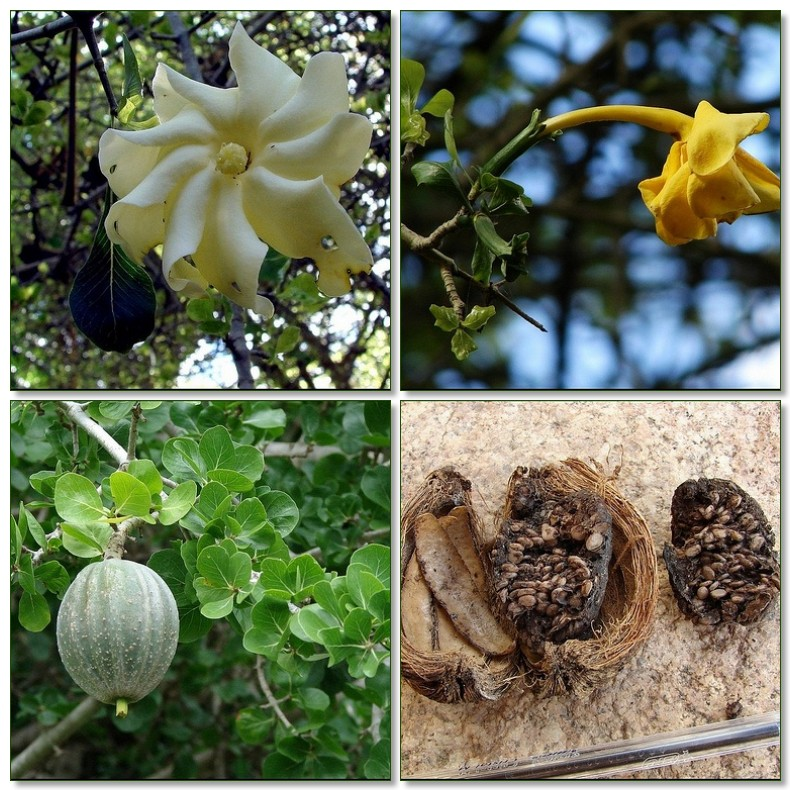
The life stages of a Gardenia volkensii flower from a young white flower (top left) to an older yellow flower (top right) to a fruit (bottom left) that ultimately withers (bottom right).

== Distribution and habitat ==
This species is found in bushveld habitats in tropical and southern Africa. It has been recorded in fourteen countries: Angola, Botswana, Eswatini, Ethiopia, Kenya, Malawi, Mozambique, Namibia, Tanzania, Uganda, Somalia, South Africa, Zambia and Zimbabwe.

== Ecology ==
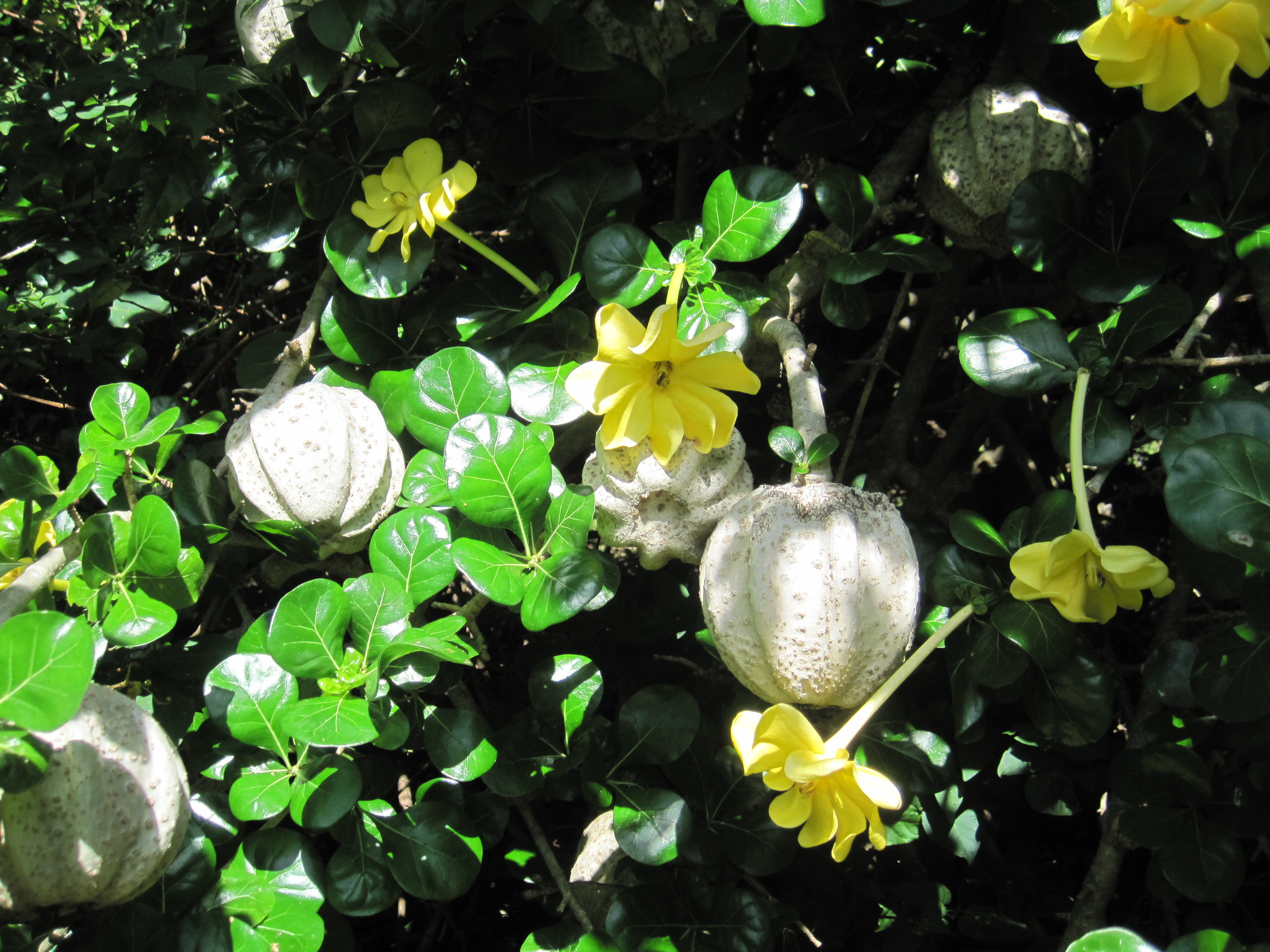
The leaves, fruits and older (yellow) flowers of a Gardenia volkensii.

Plants are often associated with termite mounds. The leaves are eaten by livestock and wild animals, including giraffe and kudu. The leaves are also important for insects, including Carlisis wahlbergi and the caterpillars of Deudorix dinochares. The scented flowers open at night and are likely pollinated by moths. The whole fruits are eaten by people in Mozambique and Ethiopia.

== Uses ==
These trees are often planted near a village to protect it from lightning. These trees are also believed to provide protection against evil spirits. The wood is hard and fine-grained and is used for carving.

This species is known to have been used medicinally to treat a variety of conditions in at least eleven of the countries in which it naturally occurs. It is used to treat respiratory infections such as asthma and tuberculosis (Botswana, Eswatini, Namibia, South Africa and Zimbabwe), menstrual problems (Zimbabwe), infertility (Kenya and Zimbabwe), gastro-intestinal problems (Eswatini, Mozambique and Namibia) and epilepsy (Botswana, Eswatini, Kenya, South Africa and Namibia), amongst others. It is also used as an antivenom and to treat cancer. The fruits and bark have been found to have anti-microbial properties.
