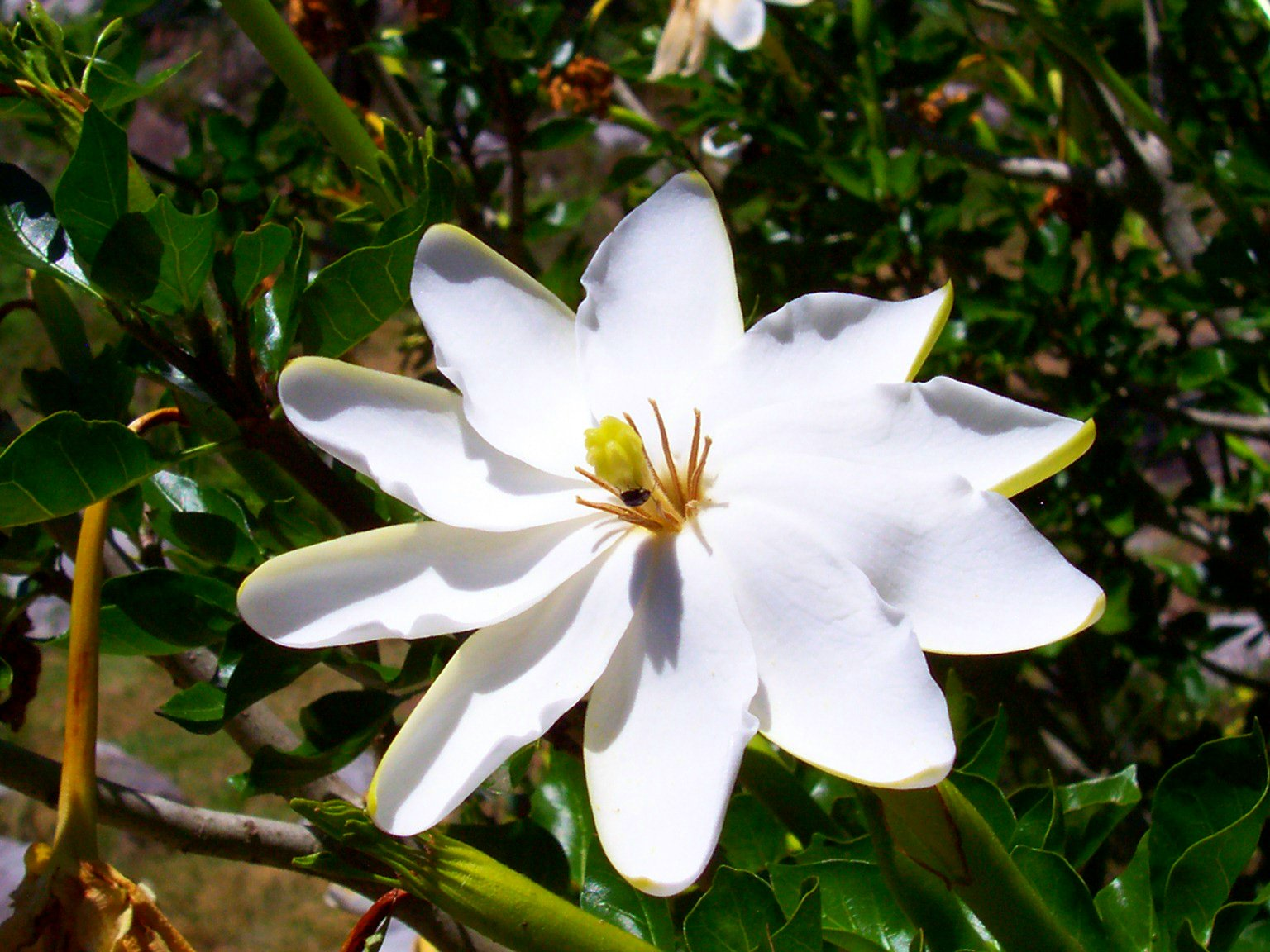

Scientific classification
- Kingdom: Plantae
- Clade: Tracheophytes
- Clade: Angiosperms
- Clade: Eudicots
- Clade: Asterids
- Order: Gentianales
- Family: Rubiaceae
- Genus: Gardenia
- Species: G. thunbergia

Binomial name
- Gardenia thunbergia Thunb.

Synonyms
- Gardenia verticillata Lam., nom. illeg.; Gardenia speciosa Salisb., nom. illeg.; Gardenia crassicaulis Salisb., nom. illeg.; Genipa thunbergia (Thunb.) Baill.; Warneria thunbergia (Thunb.) Stuntz

= Gardenia thunbergia =

African tree species

Gardenia thunbergia is a sturdy large shrub or small tree endemic to the southern and eastern regions of South Africa and neighbouring territories such as Eswatini. It grows largely in forest or on forest margins, occurring in the Eastern Cape, Natal and Transkei in South Africa. It is densely twiggy and rigid with smooth light-grey bark, and is horticulturally valuable, being easy to grow as a strong hedge, but more usually as a specimen plant, striking in appearance and long lived. The abundant and extremely fragrant flowers are about 70 mm in diameter with long tubes only accessible to the proboscises of nocturnal hawkmoths. The leaves are smooth, shiny, whorled and entire, and clustered at the ends of branchlets. The fruit is oval, hard, woody and fibrous, about 80 mm long and about 40 mm in diameter, light grey with small raised white spots and if not eaten by large browsers or elephant, will remain on the tree for years. Its common names include forest gardenia, mutarara (in the Shona language), tree gardenia, white gardenia and wild gardenia. In Afrikaans it is variously known as buffelsbol ("buffalo ball"), stompdoring ("blunt thorn"), or wildekatjiepiering ("wild gardenia").

The tree is a food plant for the larvae of some species of hawk moths such as the Oriental bee hawk moth, Cephonodes hylas, and a favoured sap tree for Carlisis wahlbergi.

Gardenia thunbergia was first introduced to Kew as early as 1773. It belongs to the very large family of Rubiaceae, which includes plants such as coffee (Coffea arabica), quinine (Cinchona) and numerous ornamental trees and shrubs with showy flowers.

It is considered a means of repelling witchcraft in Karanga traditional medicine. Members of the Johane Masowe Apostolic Church carve crosses from the mutarara which they believe protects them against evil spirits.

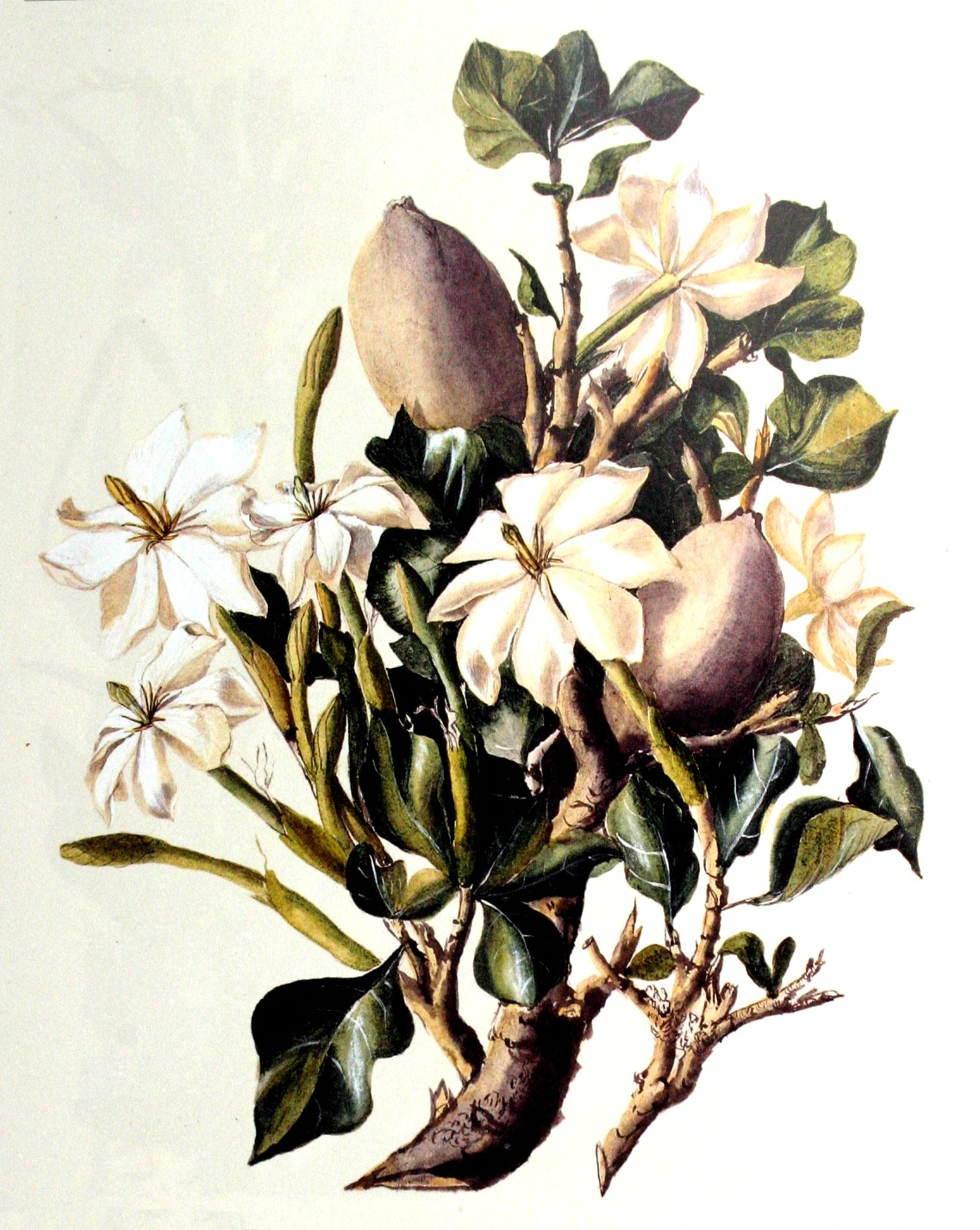
Gardenia thunbergia by Edith Struben (1868-1936)

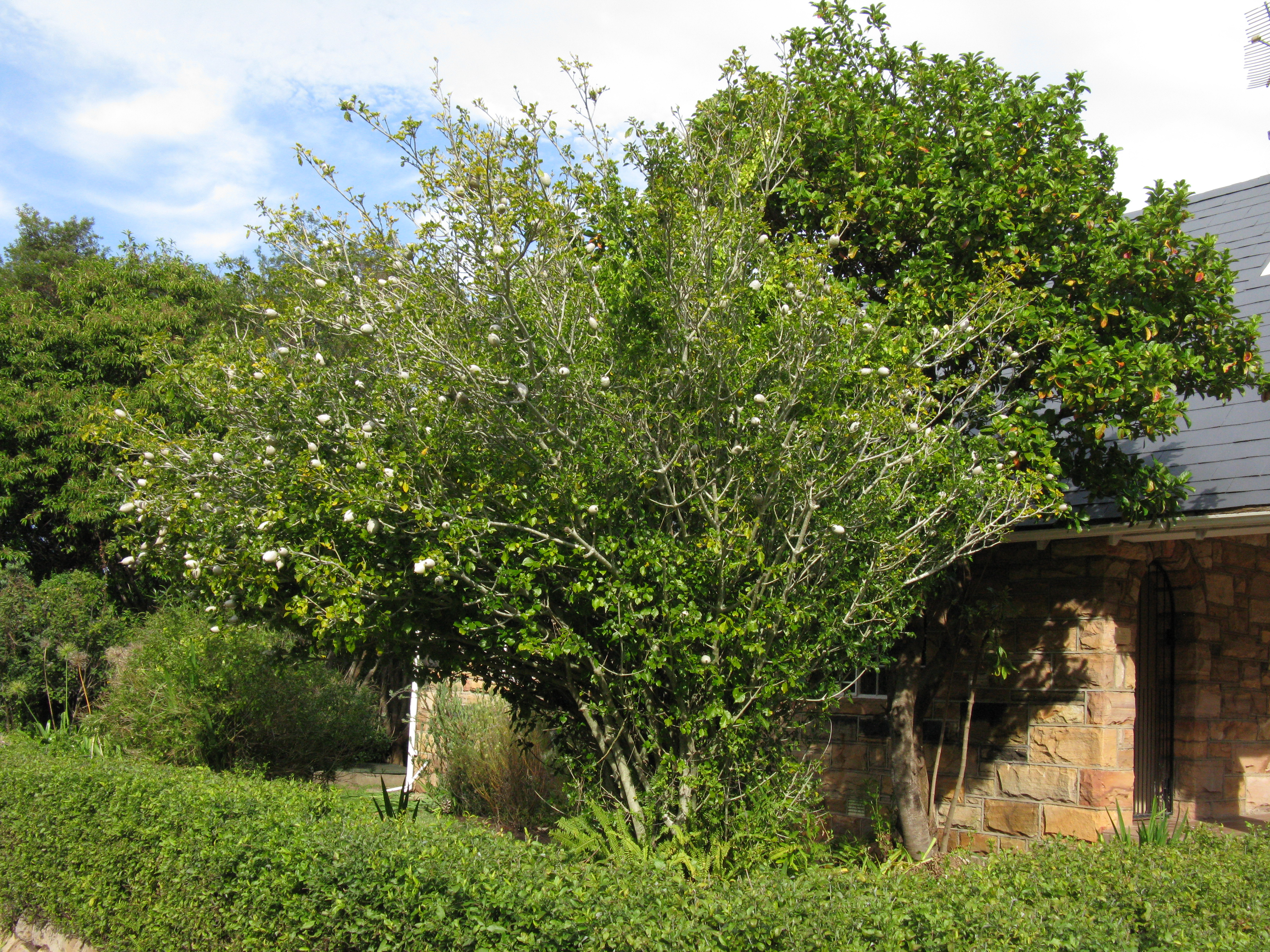
Habit of a well-grown tree in a moist garden environment

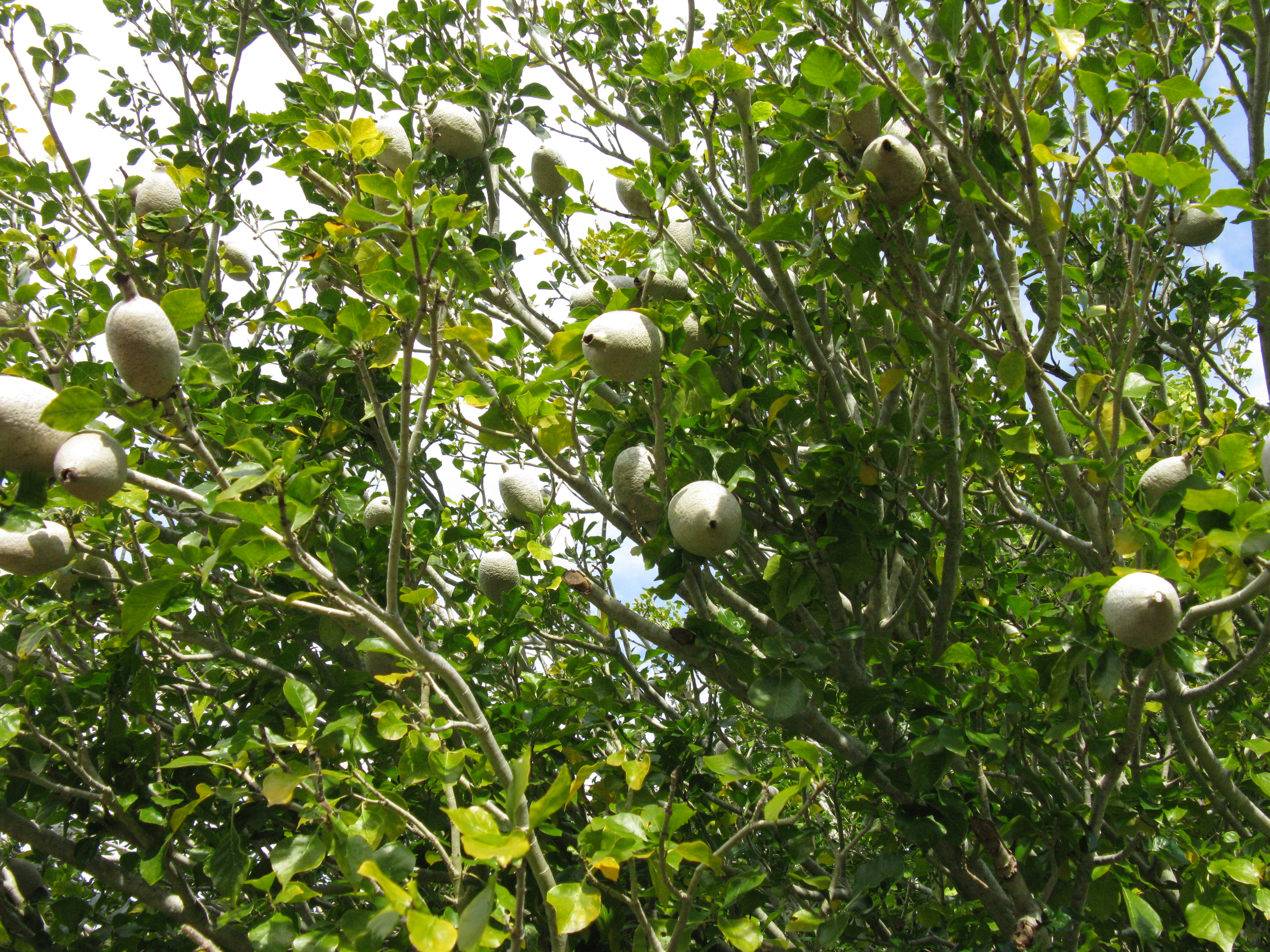
Detail of fruit that accumulates indefinitely on the tree until forcibly removed

== See also ==
- List of Southern African indigenous trees
