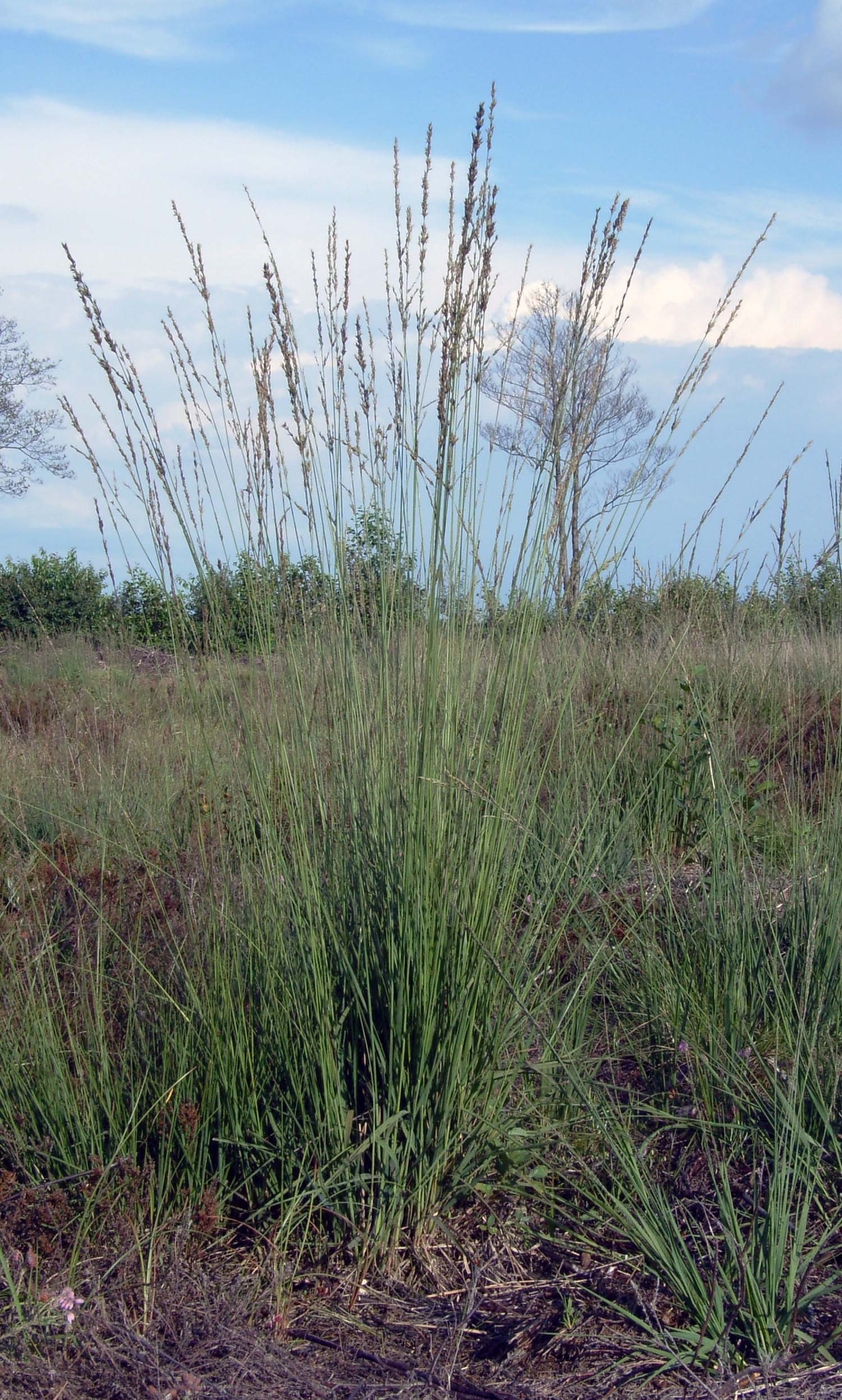
- Purple moor-grass (Molinia caerulea)

Scientific classification
- Kingdom: Plantae
- Clade: Tracheophytes
- Clade: Angiosperms
- Clade: Monocots
- Clade: Commelinids
- Order: Poales
- Family: Poaceae
- Clade: PACMAD clade
- Subfamily: Arundinoideae
- Tribe: Molinieae; Jirásek (1966)

Subtribes
- Crinipinae Conert (1961); Moliniinae Ohwi (1941)

= Molinieae =

Molinieae Temporal range: Campanian–Recent

Tribe of grasses

Molinieae is a tribe of grasses, containing 11 genera, including reed (Phragmites) and moor-grass (Molinia).

== Subtribes and genera ==
Subtribe Crinipinae

- Crinipes
- Elytrophorus
- Pratochloa
- Styppeiochloa

Subtribe Moliniinae

- Hakonechloa
- Molinia
- Moliniopsis
- Phragmites

incertae sedis

- Leptagrostis
- Piptophyllum
- Zenkeria
