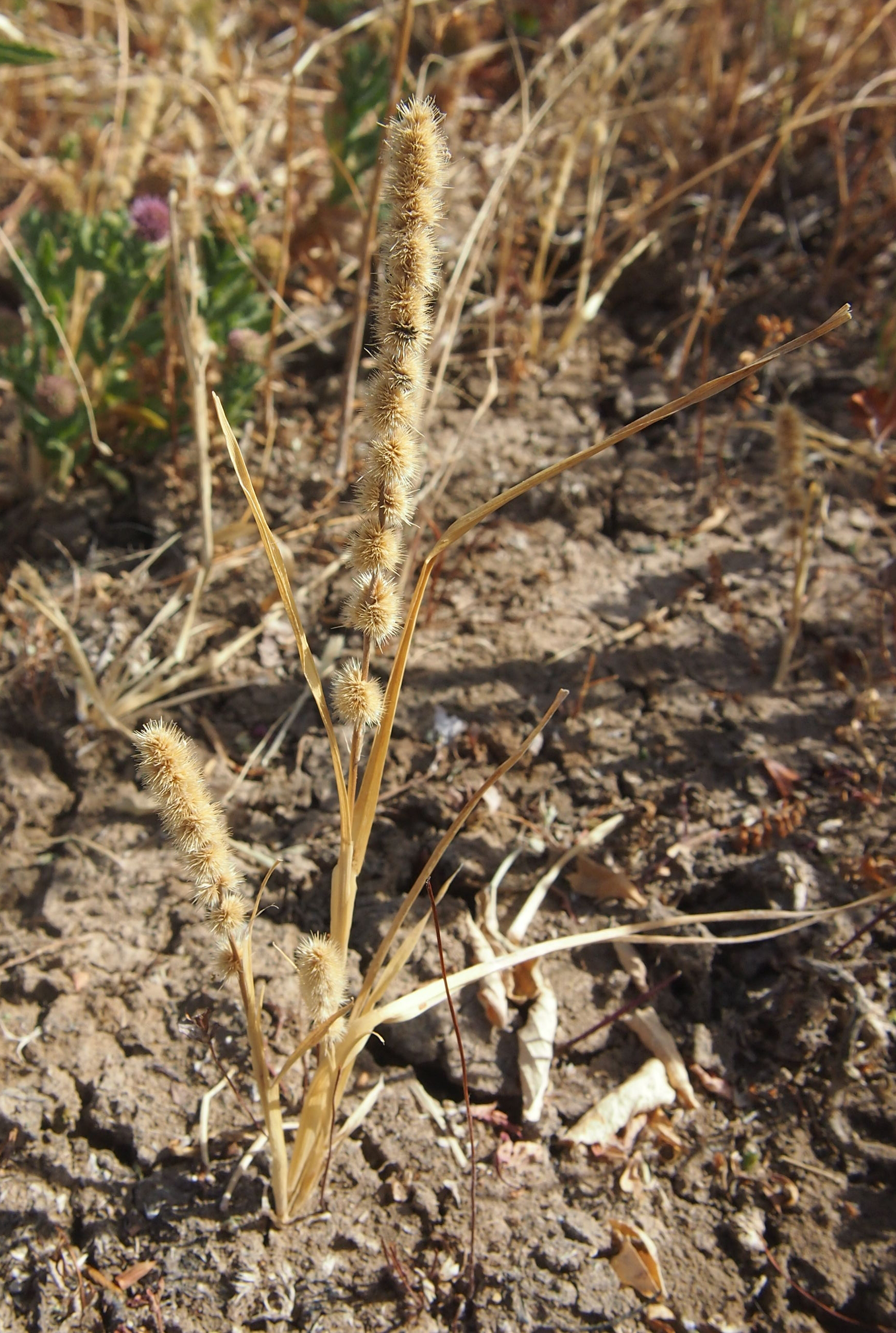
- Elytrophorus spicatus

Scientific classification
- Kingdom: Plantae
- Clade: Tracheophytes
- Clade: Angiosperms
- Clade: Monocots
- Clade: Commelinids
- Order: Poales
- Family: Poaceae
- Subfamily: Arundinoideae
- Tribe: Molinieae
- Subtribe: Crinipinae
- Genus: Elytrophorus; P.Beauv.

Type species
- Elytrophorus articulatus (syn of E. spicatus) P.Beauv.

Synonyms
- Echinalysium Trin.

= Elytrophorus =

Genus of grasses

Elytrophorus is a genus of Asian, African, and Australian plants in the grass family.

Species

- Elytrophorus globularis Hack. – Republic of the Congo, Tanzania, Angola, Zambia, Zimbabwe, Botswana, Limpopo, Namibia
- Elytrophorus spicatus (Willd.) A.Camus – tropical Africa, Indian Subcontinent, Indochina, Hainan, Yunnan, Lesser Sunda Islands, Australia
