= Zenkeria sebastinei =

Scientific classification
- Kingdom: Plantae
- Clade: Tracheophytes
- Clade: Angiosperms
- Clade: Monocots
- Clade: Commelinids
- Order: Poales
- Family: Poaceae
- Genus: Zenkeria
- Species: Z. sebastinei

Binomial name
- Zenkeria sebastinei A.N.Henry & Chandrab.

Species of grass

Zenkeria sebastinei is a species of grass in the family Poaceae found in Pothigai Hills, Kerala, India.
