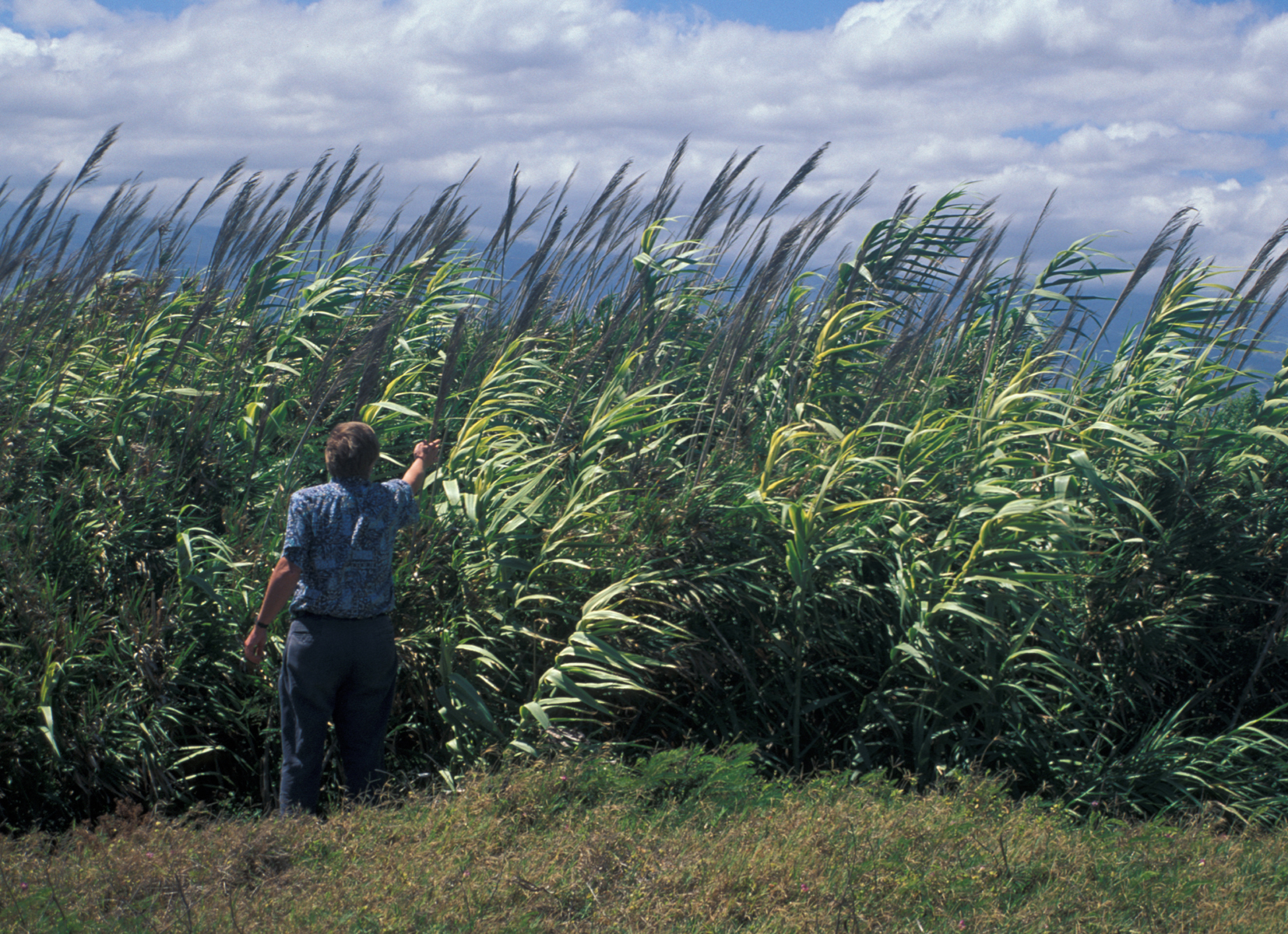
- Giant reed (Arundo donax)

Scientific classification
- Kingdom: Plantae
- Clade: Tracheophytes
- Clade: Angiosperms
- Clade: Monocots
- Clade: Commelinids
- Order: Poales
- Family: Poaceae
- Clade: PACMAD clade
- Subfamily: Arundinoideae
- Tribe: Arundineae; Dumort. (1824)

Genera
- Amphipogon (syn. Diplopogon); Arundo; Dregeochloa; Monachather

Synonyms
- Amphipogoneae L. Watson & T.D. Macfarl. (2002); subtribe Arundininae Miq. (1857)

= Arundineae =

Tribe of grasses

Arundineae is a tribe of grasses, containing four genera.

It is not to be confused with the bamboo tribe Arundinarieae and the panicoid tribe Arundinelleae.
