= Crinipes =

Scientific classification
- Kingdom: Plantae
- Clade: Tracheophytes
- Clade: Angiosperms
- Clade: Monocots
- Clade: Commelinids
- Order: Poales
- Family: Poaceae
- Subfamily: Arundinoideae
- Tribe: Molinieae
- Subtribe: Crinipinae
- Genus: Crinipes; Hochst.

Type species
- Crinipes abyssinicus (Hochst. ex A.Braun) Hochst.

Genus of grasses

Crinipes is a genus of plants in the Poaceae−grass family native to central Africa.

== Species ==
Species of Crinipes include:

- Crinipes abyssinicus (Hochst. ex A. Braun) Hochst. — endemic to Ethiopia
- Crinipes longifolius C.E.Hubb. — native to Ethiopia, South Sudan, and Uganda

=== Former species ===
Species formerly classified within Crinipes include:

- Crinipes gynoglossa — Styppeiochloa gynoglossa.
- Crinipes longipes — Nematopoa longipes.
