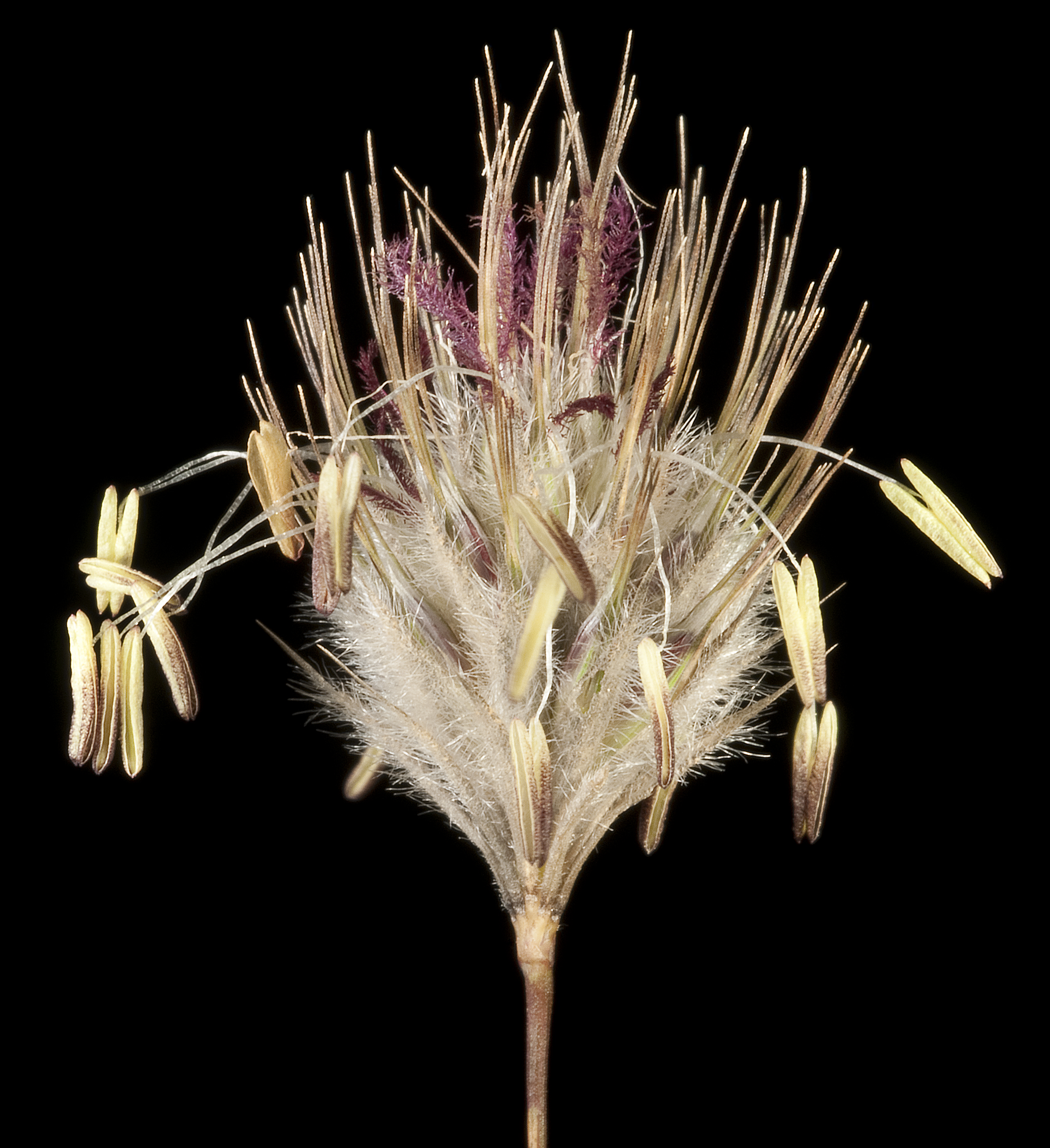
- Amphipogon turbinatus

Scientific classification
- Kingdom: Plantae
- Clade: Tracheophytes
- Clade: Angiosperms
- Clade: Monocots
- Clade: Commelinids
- Order: Poales
- Family: Poaceae
- Subfamily: Arundinoideae
- Tribe: Arundineae
- Genus: Amphipogon; R.Br.

Synonyms
- Gamelythrum Nees; Pentacraspedon Steud.

= Amphipogon =

Greybeard grasses

Genus of grasses

Amphipogon, the greybeard grasses, is a genus of Australian plants in the grass family.

== Species ==
As of October 2024, Plants of the World Online accepted the following species:

- Amphipogon amphipogonoides (Steud.) Vickery
- Amphipogon avenaceus R.Br.
- Amphipogon caricinus F.Muell.
- Amphipogon debilis R.Br.
- Amphipogon laguroides R.Br.
- Amphipogon sericeus (Vickery) T.D.Macfarl.
- Amphipogon setaceus (R.Br.) T.D.Macfarl.
- Amphipogon strictus R.Br.
- Amphipogon turbinatus R.Br.

Formerly included

- Amphipogon humilis - Melanocenchris jacquemontii

== See also ==
- List of Poaceae genera
