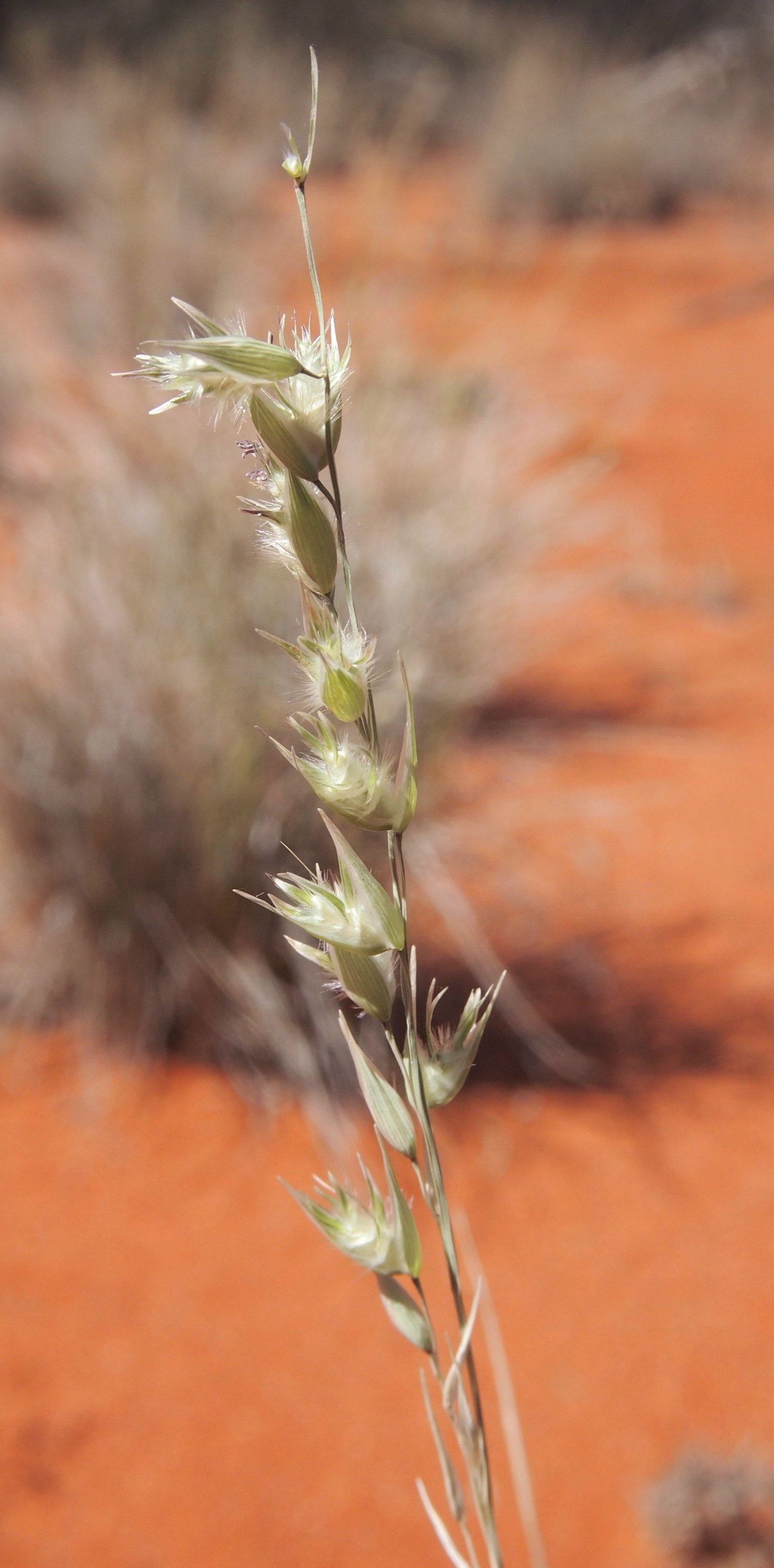
- Monachather seed head

Scientific classification
- Kingdom: Plantae
- Clade: Tracheophytes
- Clade: Angiosperms
- Clade: Monocots
- Clade: Commelinids
- Order: Poales
- Family: Poaceae
- Subfamily: Arundinoideae
- Tribe: Arundineae
- Genus: Monachather; Steud.
- Species: M. paradoxus

Binomial name
- Monachather paradoxus Steud.

Synonyms
- Danthonia bipartita F.Muell.; Monachather paradoxa orth. var.

= Monachather =

Genus of grasses

Monachather, common name mulga oats, is a genus of Australian plants in the grass family.

Species

The only known species is Monachather paradoxus.
