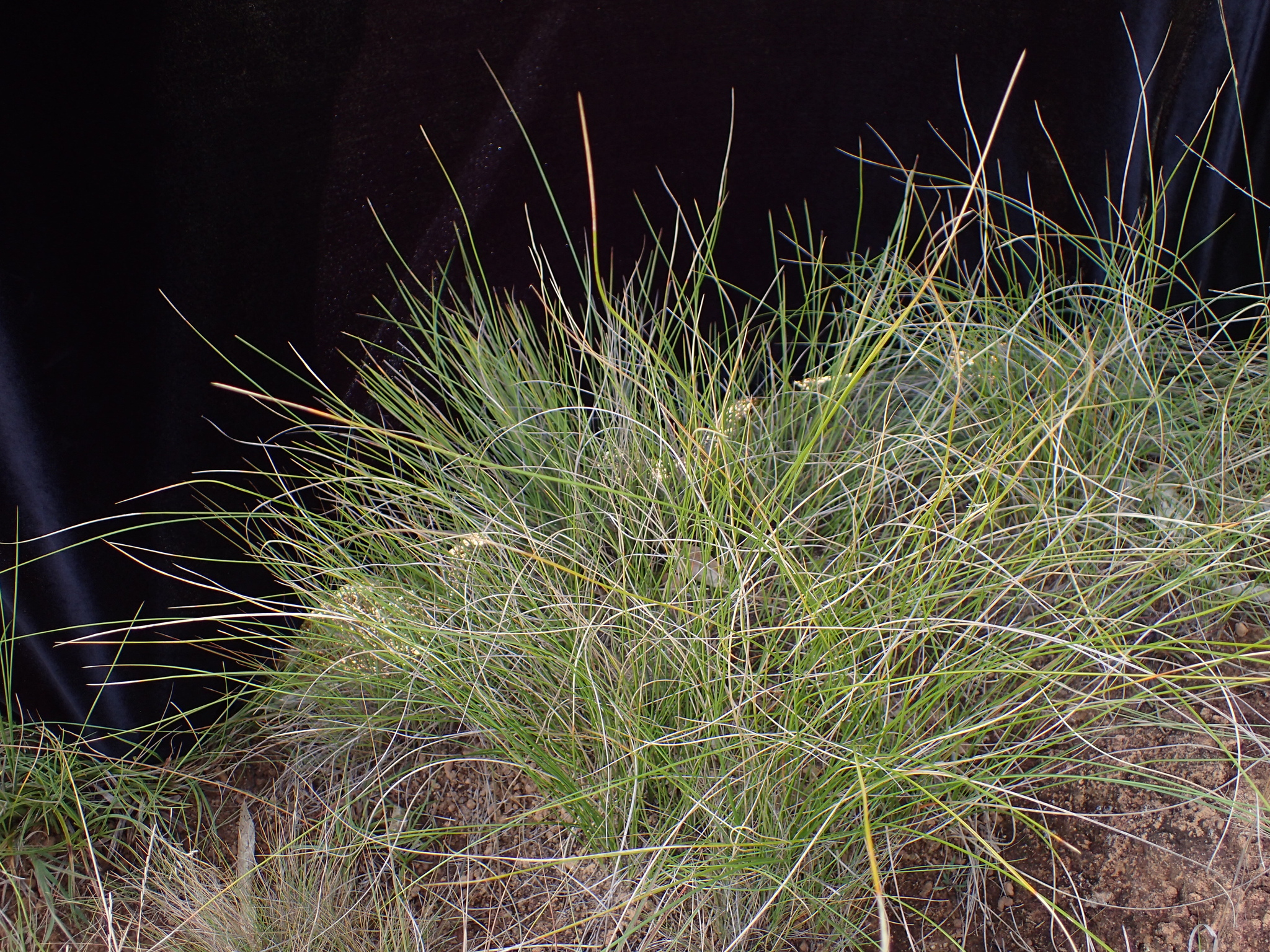
- Styppeiochloa hitchcockii in Madagascar

Scientific classification
- Kingdom: Plantae
- Clade: Tracheophytes
- Clade: Angiosperms
- Clade: Monocots
- Clade: Commelinids
- Order: Poales
- Family: Poaceae
- Subfamily: Arundinoideae
- Tribe: Molinieae
- Subtribe: Crinipinae
- Genus: Styppeiochloa; De Winter

Type species
- Styppeiochloa gynoglossa (Gooss.) De Winter

= Styppeiochloa =

Genus of grasses

Styppeiochloa is a genus of African plants in the grass family.

Species

- Styppeiochloa catherineana Cope & Ryves - Angola
- Styppeiochloa gynoglossa (Gooss.) De Winter - Mozambique, Zimbabwe, Eswatini, Cape Province, KwaZulu-Natal, Limpopo, Mpumalanga, Gauteng
- Styppeiochloa hitchcockii (A.Camus) Cope - Madagascar
