= Piptophyllum =

Scientific classification
- Kingdom: Plantae
- Clade: Tracheophytes
- Clade: Angiosperms
- Clade: Monocots
- Clade: Commelinids
- Order: Poales
- Family: Poaceae
- Subfamily: Arundinoideae
- Tribe: Molinieae
- Genus: Piptophyllum; C.E.Hubb.
- Species: P. welwitschii

Binomial name
- Piptophyllum welwitschii (Rendle) C.E.Hubb.

Synonyms
- Pentaschistis welwitschii Rendle

Genus of grasses

Piptophyllum is a genus of plants in the grass family. The only known species is Piptophyllum welwitschii, native to Angola.
