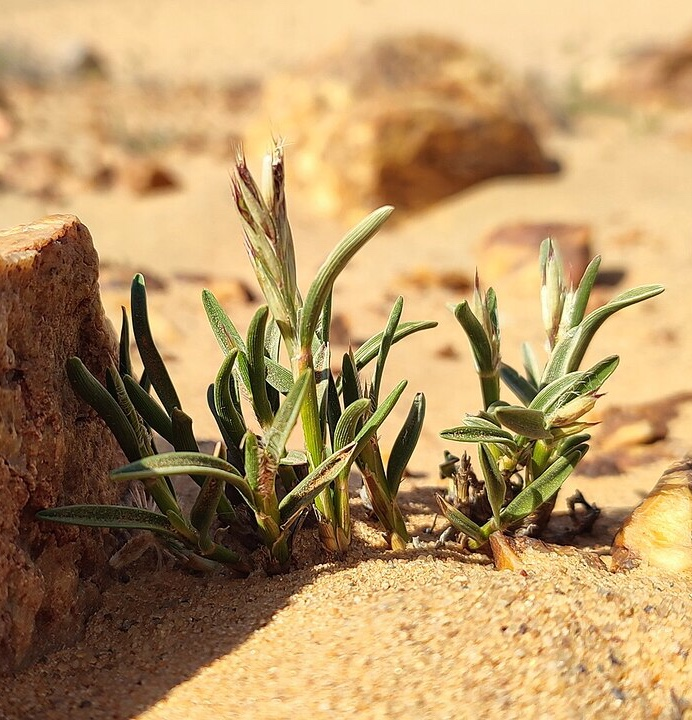
- Dregeochloa pumila

Scientific classification
- Kingdom: Plantae
- Clade: Tracheophytes
- Clade: Angiosperms
- Clade: Monocots
- Clade: Commelinids
- Order: Poales
- Family: Poaceae
- Subfamily: Arundinoideae
- Tribe: Arundineae
- Genus: Dregeochloa; Conert

= Dregeochloa =

Genus of grasses

Dregeochloa is a genus of African plants in the grass family.

Dregeochloa is most remarkable for the species D. pumila, the only known example of leaf succulence in the entire grass family.

Species

- Dregeochloa calviniensis Conert - Cape Province
- Dregeochloa pumila (Nees) Conert - Namibia, Cape Province
