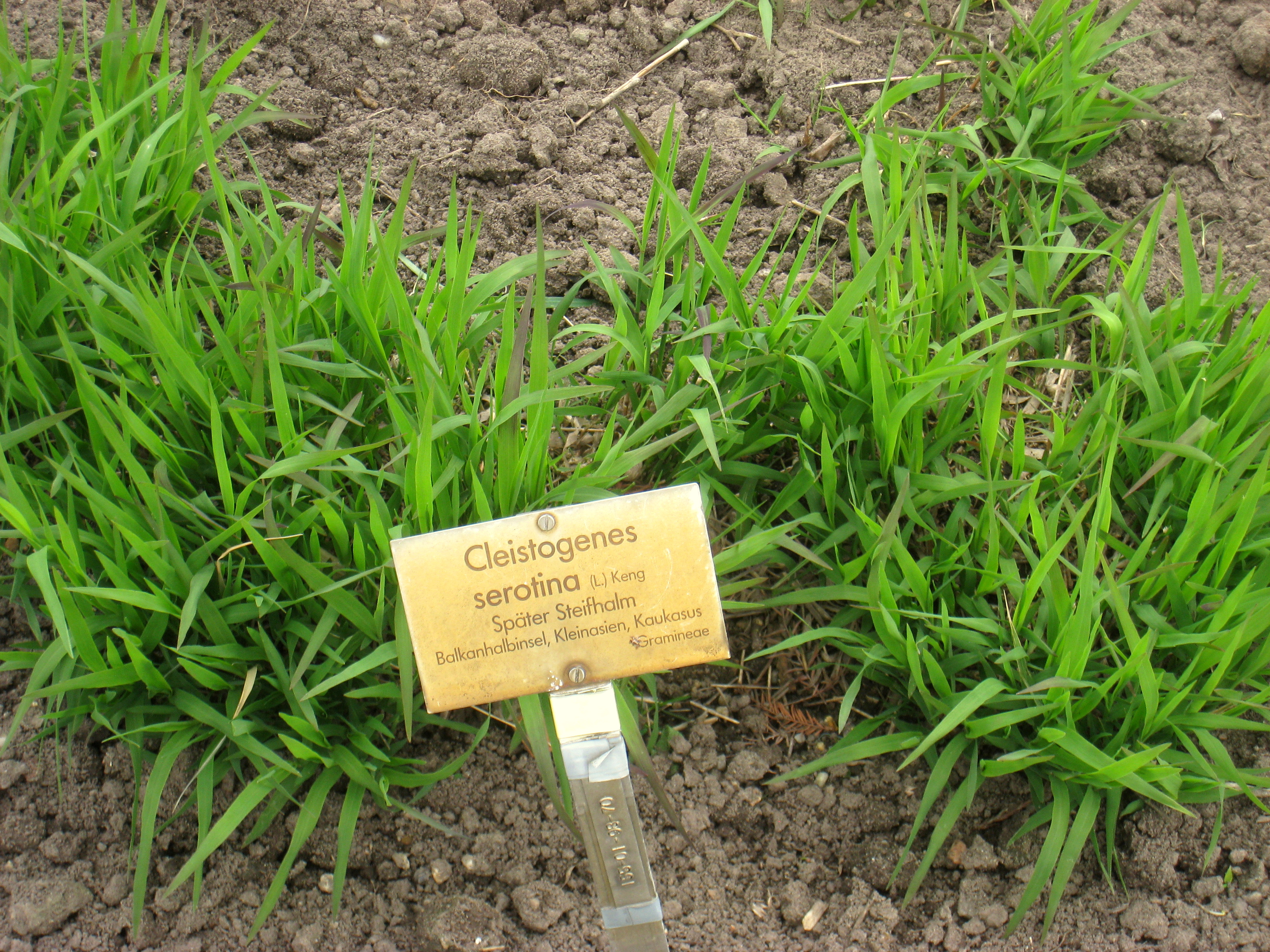
- Cleistogenes serotina

Scientific classification
- Kingdom: Plantae
- Clade: Tracheophytes
- Clade: Angiosperms
- Clade: Monocots
- Clade: Commelinids
- Order: Poales
- Family: Poaceae
- Subfamily: Chloridoideae
- Tribe: Cynodonteae
- Subtribe: Orininae
- Genus: Cleistogenes; Keng

Type species
- Cleistogenes serotina (L.) Keng.

Synonyms
- Kengia Packer

= Cleistogenes =

Genus of grasses

Cleistogenes is a genus of Eurasian flowering plants in the grass family.

The name Cleistogenes was for a time considered an invalidly published name synonymous with Kengia, but revisions to the Code of Nomenclature have reversed this situation. Cleistogenes is now the correct name.

Species

- Cleistogenes caespitosa Keng - China
- Cleistogenes festucacea Honda - China
- Cleistogenes gatacrei (Stapf) Bor - Afghanistan, Pakistan
- Cleistogenes hackelii (Honda) Honda - China, Japan, Korea
- Cleistogenes hancei Keng - China, Primorye
- Cleistogenes kitagawae Honda - Hebei, Liaoning, Mongolia, Russian Far East, Siberia
- Cleistogenes mucronata Keng f. - China
- Cleistogenes nedoluzhkoi Tzvelev - Primorye
- Cleistogenes polyphylla Keng f. - China
- Cleistogenes ramiflora Keng f. & C.P.Wang - Inner Mongolia
- Cleistogenes serotina (L.) Keng - Eurasia from Spain to Kazakhstan
- Cleistogenes songorica (Roshev.) Ohwi - China, Kazakhstan, Kyrgyzstan, Mongolia, Russia, Turkmenistan, Uzbekistan
- Cleistogenes squarrosa (Trin. ex Ledeb.) Keng - China, Kazakhstan, Mongolia, Russia, Caucasus

formerly included

see Orinus

- Cleistogenes kokonorica - Orinus kokonorica
- Cleistogenes thoroldii - Orinus thoroldii
