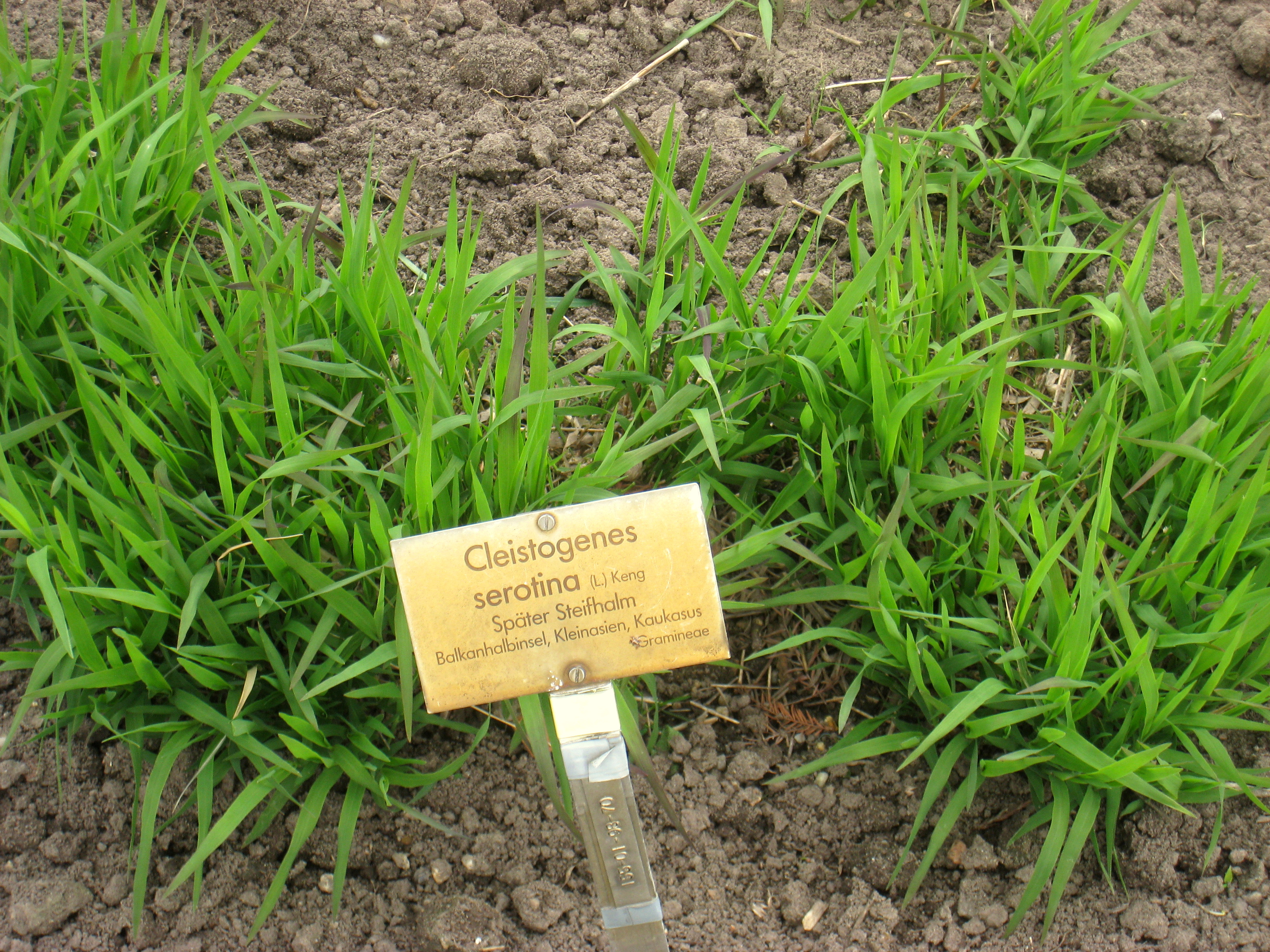

Scientific classification
- Kingdom: Plantae
- Clade: Tracheophytes
- Clade: Angiosperms
- Clade: Monocots
- Clade: Commelinids
- Order: Poales
- Family: Poaceae
- Subfamily: Chloridoideae
- Genus: Cleistogenes
- Species: C. serotina

Binomial name
- Cleistogenes serotina (L.) Keng

= Cleistogenes serotina =

Species of grass

Cleistogenes serotina is a species of grass in the family Poaceae, native to Europe and temperate Asia. Culms are geniculately ascending, 1 mm in diameter, and 30–60 cm in height. Leaf-blades are spreading, flat, or involute, from 4–8 cm long and 3–5 mm wide.

== Synonyms ==
- Festuca serotina
- Kengia serotina
