= Zenkeria (plant) =

Scientific classification
- Kingdom: Plantae
- Clade: Tracheophytes
- Clade: Angiosperms
- Clade: Monocots
- Clade: Commelinids
- Order: Poales
- Family: Poaceae
- Subfamily: Arundinoideae
- Tribe: Molinieae
- Genus: Zenkeria; Trin. 1837 not Rchb. 1841 (syn of Parmentiera in Bignoniaceae) nor Arn. 1838 (Fabaceae)

Type species
- Zenkeria elegans Trin.

Genus of grasses

Zenkeria is a genus of South Asian plants in the grass family.

Species

- Zenkeria elegans Trin. - Tamil Nadu; naturalized in Sri Lanka
- Zenkeria jainii N.C.Nair, Sreek. & V.J.Nair - India
- Zenkeria obtusiflora (Thwaites) Benth. - Sri Lanka
- Zenkeria sebastinei A.N.Henry & Chandrab. - Kerala
- Zenkeria stapfii Henrard - Tamil Nadu, Sri Lanka
