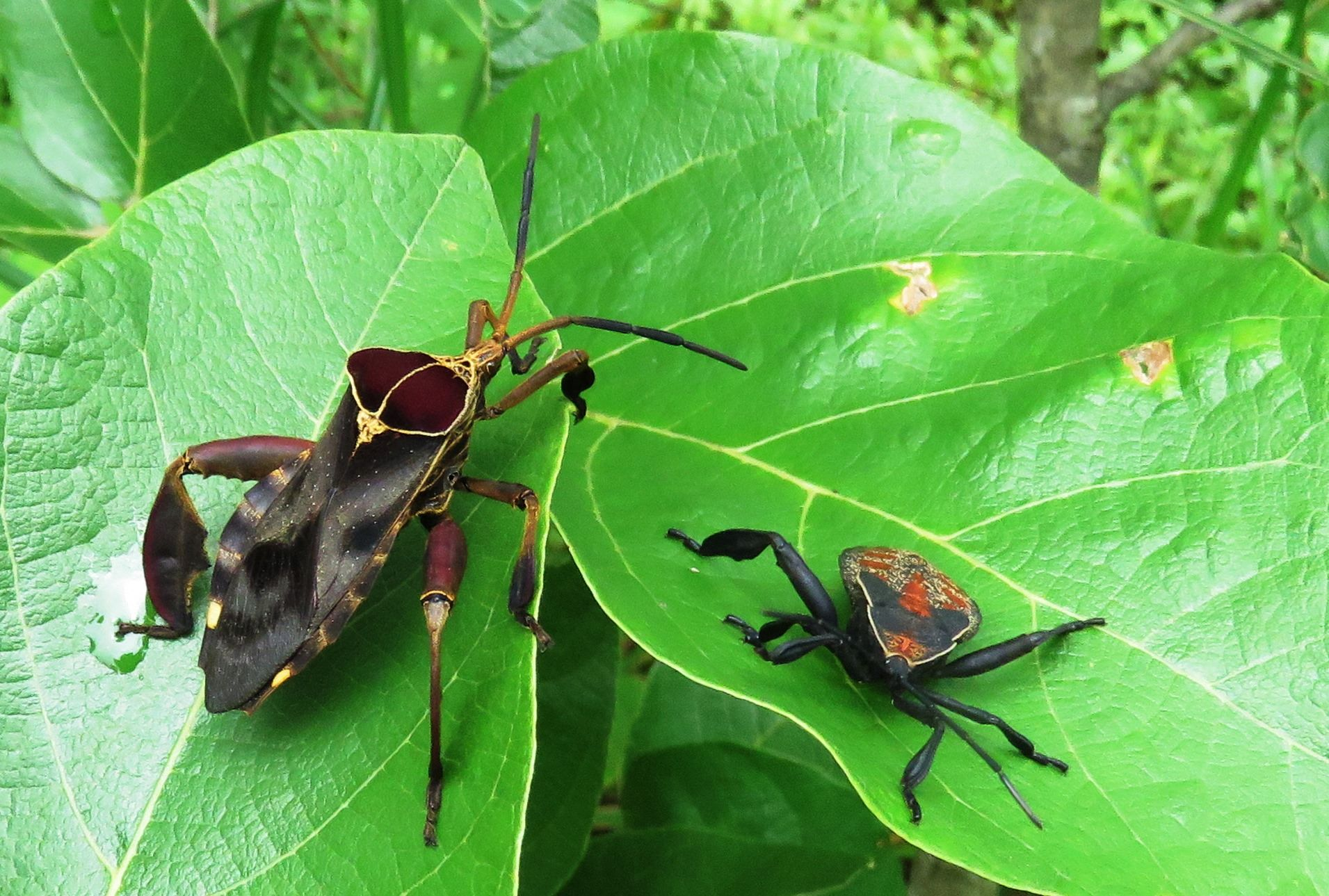
- Petascelis remipes

Scientific classification
- Kingdom: Animalia
- Phylum: Arthropoda
- Clade: Pancrustacea
- Class: Insecta
- Order: Hemiptera
- Suborder: Heteroptera
- Family: Coreidae
- Subfamily: Coreinae
- Tribe: Petascelini; Stål, 1873

Synonyms
- Petaloscelidaria Bergroth, 1913; Petascelaria Stål, 1873; Petascelidae Stål, 1873; Petascelidini Stål, 1873; Petascelinae Stål, 1873

= Petascelini =

Tribe of true bugs

The Petascelini are a tribe of leaf-footed bugs, in the subfamily Coreinae erected (as "Petascelaria") by Carl Stål in 1873. Many genera are from tropical Africa including the type genus Petascelis, but some are from South-East Asia. Ahmad gives key to the tribes of Coreinae including these genera.

== Genera ==
The Coreoidea Species File lists:

1. Aurivilliana Distant, 1881
2. Carlisis Stål, 1858
3. Dilycochtha Karsch, 1895
4. Neotrematocoris Ahmad, 1979 - Bangladesh
5. Oxypristis Signoret, 1861 - Madagascar
6. Petascelis Signoret, 1847 - type genus, sub-Saharan Africa (= Petaloscelis Bergroth, 1893)
7. Petascelisca Distant, 1881
8. Petillia Stål, 1865
9. Petillocoris Hsiao, 1963 - China
10. Petillopsis Hsiao, 1963 - India to Myanmar
11. Sulpicia (bug) Stål, 1866
12. Trematocoris Mayr, 1865 - India, China, Thailand, Malesia
13. Zenkeria (bug) Karsch, 1895
