= Moliniopsis =

Moliniopsis japonica

Scientific classification
- Kingdom: Plantae
- Clade: Tracheophytes
- Clade: Angiosperms
- Clade: Monocots
- Clade: Commelinids
- Order: Poales
- Family: Poaceae
- Genus: Moliniopsis; Hayata
- Species: M. japonica

Binomial name
- Moliniopsis japonica (Hack.) Hayata

Synonyms
- Graphephorum nipponicum Honda; Molinia japonica Hack.; Moliniopsis hui (Pilg.) Keng; Moliniopsis intermedia Keng; Moliniopsis nipponica (Honda) Honda

Species of grass

Moliniopsis is a monotypic genus of flowering plants belonging to the family Poaceae. It just contains one species, Moliniopsis japonica (Hack.) Hayata.

It is native to south-east China, Japan, Korea, Kuril Islands (Russian Island) and Sakhalin (Russian Island).

The genus name of Moliniopsis is in honour of Juan Ignacio Molina (1740–1829), was a Chilean Jesuit priest, naturalist, historian, translator, geographer, botanist, ornithologist, and linguist. The Latin specific epithet of japonica means "of Japan". Both genus and species were first described and published in Bot. Mag. (Tokyo) Vol.39 on page 258 in 1925.
