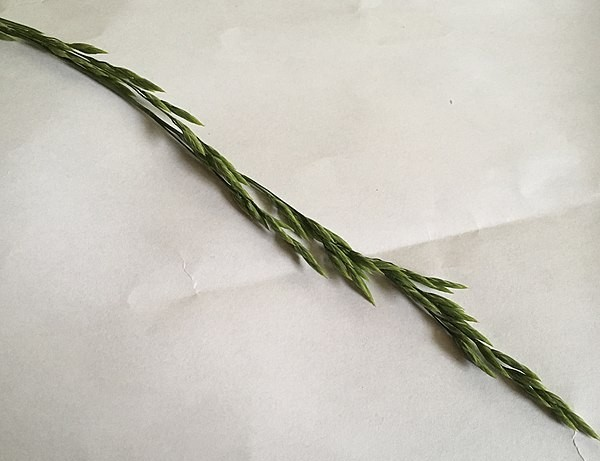
- Arrhenatherum elatius

Scientific classification
- Kingdom: Plantae
- Clade: Tracheophytes
- Clade: Angiosperms
- Clade: Monocots
- Clade: Commelinids
- Order: Poales
- Family: Poaceae
- Subfamily: Pooideae
- Supertribe: Poodae
- Tribe: Poeae
- Subtribe: Aveninae
- Genus: Arrhenatherum; P.Beauv.

Type species
- Arrhenatherum avenaceum ≡ Arrhenatherum elatius P.Beauv. ex Boiss.

Synonyms
- Thorea Rouy 1913, illegitimate homonym not Bory 1808 (Rhodophyta) nor Briq. 1902 (Apiaceae); Pseudarrhenatherum Rouy; Thoreochloa Holub

= Arrhenatherum =

Genus of grasses

Arrhenatherum, commonly called oat-grass or button-grass, is a genus of Eurasian and North African plants in the grass family.

== Description ==
Wild forms can resemble wild oat (Avena) or fescue (Festuca). Oat-grasses are very common perennials with yellowish roots. The shining stems grow to a height of 1.80 m (6 ft), but die off in winter. The leaves are hairless with blunt ligules. The inflorescence is a panicle with two-flowered bisexual spikelets.

Species

- Arrhenatherum album - tall oat-grass - Mediterranean from Portugal to Cyprus
- Arrhenatherum calderae - Tenerife in Canary Islands
- Arrhenatherum elatius - false oat-grass, tall oat-grass, tall meadow oat - Eurasia + North Africa from Iceland to Canary Islands + Kazakhstan; naturalized in East Asia, Australia, New Zealand, the Americas
- Arrhenatherum kotschyii - Turkey, Caucasus, Syria, Lebanon, Palestine, Jordan, Iraq, Iran, Afghanistan
- Arrhenatherum longifolium - France, Spain, Portugal, Morocco
- Arrhennatherum palaestinum - eastern Mediterranean from Greece to Iraq
- Arrhenatherum pallens - Portugal

Formerly included

Numerous species are now considered better placed in other genera: Avenula, Danthoniastrum, Duthiea, Helictochloa, Helictotrichon and Sphenopholis.

== In culture ==
Arrhenatherum remains are found in northern European burials from the Iron Age but disappear after Christianisation. It has been argued that they are included in the Old Norse category of laukar ('leeks') and may have reflected the rebirth of the dead, or as protection during their journey to the afterlife.

== See also ==
- List of Poaceae genera
