= Grey oat =

Grey oat usually refers to Avena strigosa, more often called the black oat.

Grey oat less often refers to Avena sativa, more often called the common oat or white oat.

== See also ==
- Avena, the genus of oats
