= Ornamental grass =

Grass grown as an ornamental plant

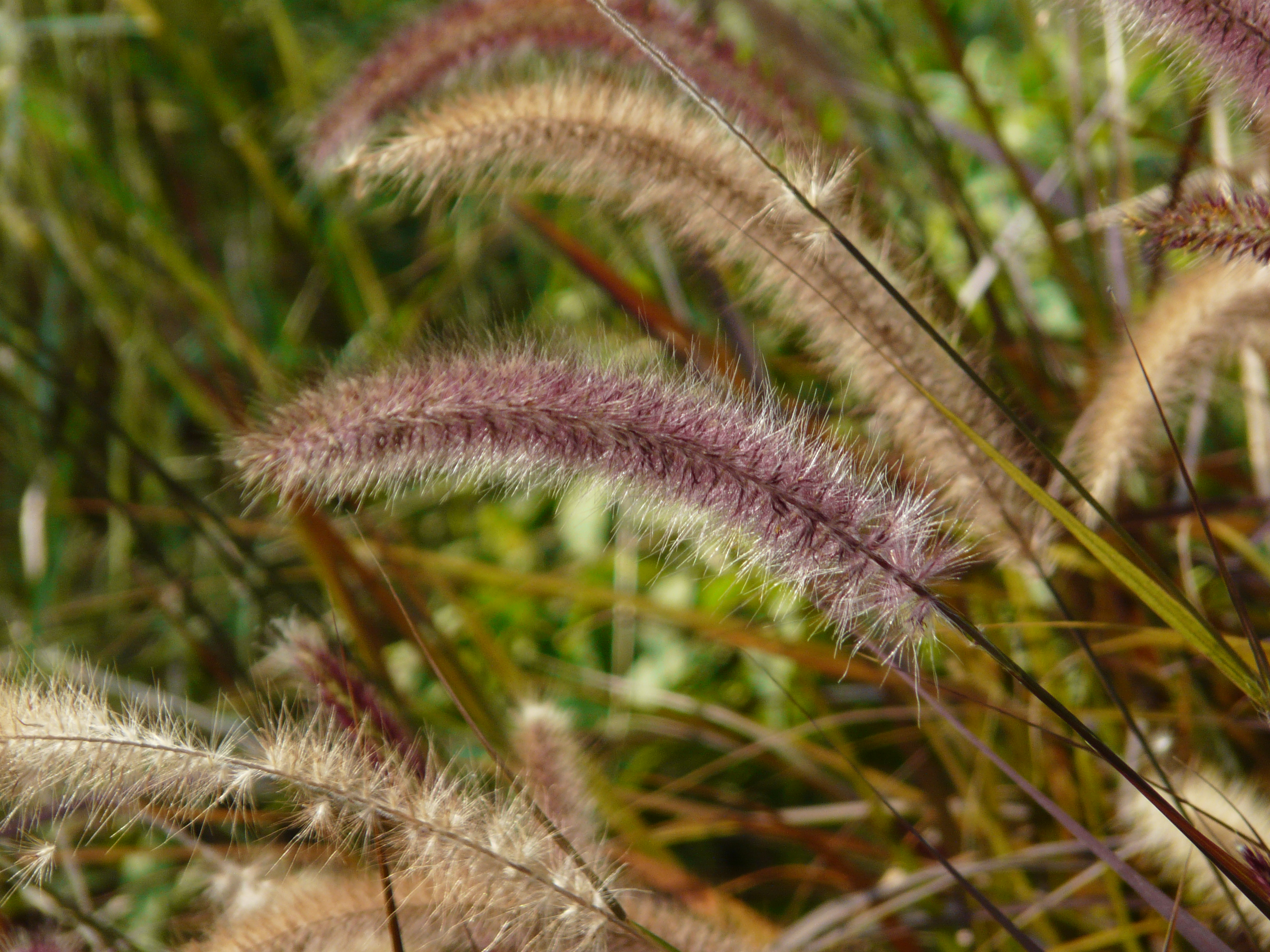
Crimson fountaingrass (Pennisetum setaceum)

Ornamental grasses are grasses grown as ornamental plants. Ornamental grasses are popular in many colder hardiness zones for their resilience to cold temperatures and aesthetic value throughout fall and winter seasons.

== Classifications ==
Along with true grasses (Poaceae), several other families of grass-like plants are typically marketed as ornamental grasses. These include the sedges (Cyperaceae), rushes (Juncaceae), restios (Restionaceae), and cat-tails (Typhaceae). All are monocotyledons, typically with narrow leaves and parallel veins. Most are herbaceous perennials, though many are evergreen and some develop woody tissues. They bring striking linear form, texture, color, motion, and sound to the garden, throughout the year.

== Habits ==
Almost all ornamental grasses are perennials, coming up in spring from their roots, which have stored large quantities of energy, and in fall or winter go dormant. Some, notably bamboos, are evergreen, and a few are annuals. Many are bunch grasses and tussock grasses, though others form extensive systems of many-branched rhizomes. The bunching types are often called "clump-forming" or "clumping", distinct from the rhizomatous types, called "running". Sizes vary from a few centimeters up to several meters; the larger bamboos may reach 20 m or more tall. Some ornamental grasses are species that can be grown from seed. Many others are cultivars, and must be propagated by vegetative propagation of an existing plant.

Pampas grass (Cortaderia selloana) is easily recognizable, with semi-dwarf to very large selections for the landscape. Deer grass (Muhlenbergia rigens) and canyon prince wild blue rye (Leymus condensatus) are popular in larger settings, natural landscaping, and native plant gardens. There are Miscanthus grasses whose variegations are horizontal, and appear even on a cloudy day to be stippled with sunshine. Many Miscanthus and Pennisetum species flower in mid or late summer, and the seed heads are long lasting, often remaining well into the winter. Some Stipa species flower in the spring, the inflorescence standing almost two metres above the clumps of leaves, and again the seed heads last late into the winter.

When gardening near natural Wildland–urban interfaces, one should take care to avoid planting invasive species, such as Cortaderia jubata (native to Argentina and the Andes), Pennisetum setaceum (native to northeastern Africa and western Asia), and Nassella tenuissima (syn. Stipa tenuissima; native to New Mexico, Texas, and South America). Not only do invasive species compete with native plants, but they may also increase the risk of wildfires, especially in areas such as California.

== Examples ==
=== True grasses ===
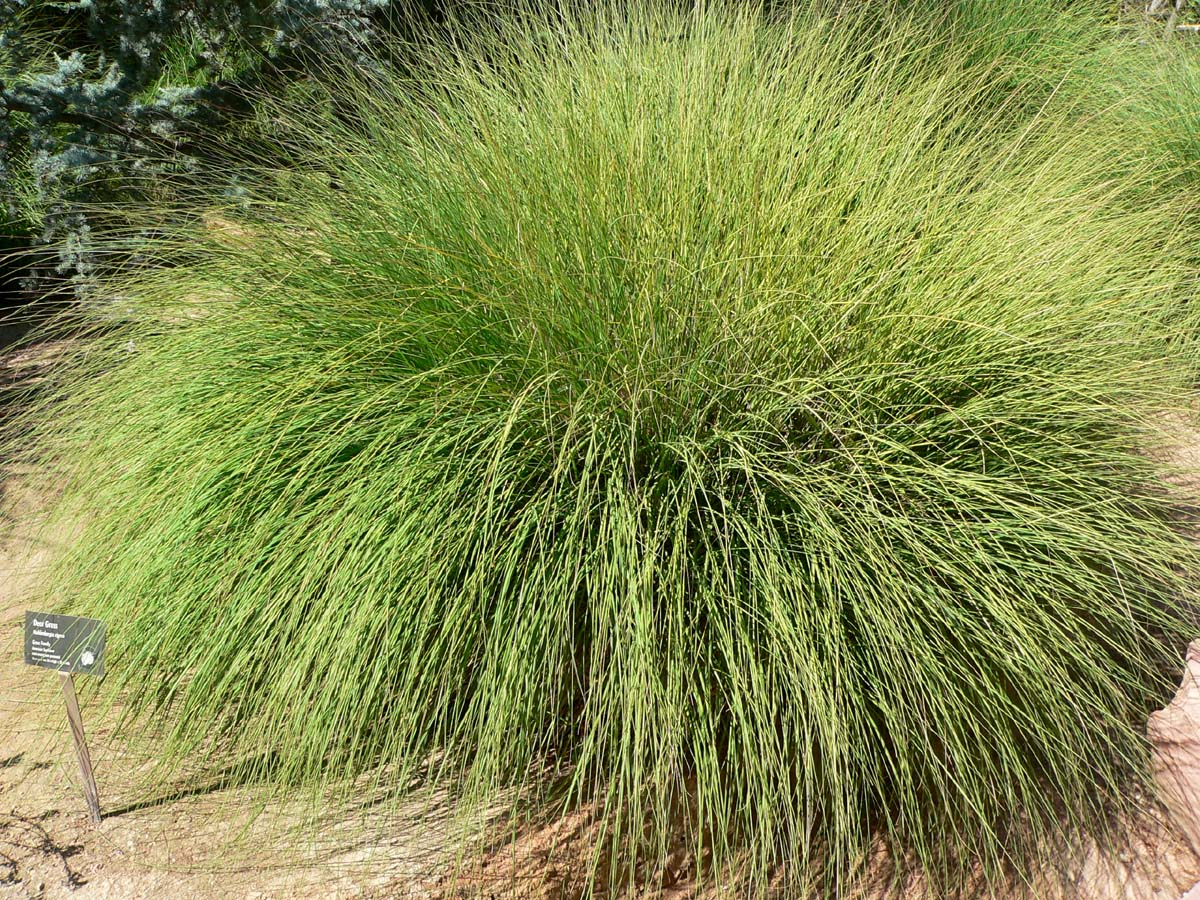
Muhlenbergia rigens

- Agrostis nebulosa (cloud grass)
- Calamagrostis × acutiflora (feather reed grass) - several cultivars
- Calamagrostis brachytricha AGM (Korean feather reed grass)
- Calamagrostis foliosa (coastal or leafy reedgrass)
- Cortaderia selloana (pampas grass) - many cultivars
- Deschampsia cespitosa (tufted hair-grass) - many cultivars
- Festuca arundinacea (tall fescue) - many cultivars
- Festuca californica (California fescue)
- Festuca glauca (blue fescue, grey fescue, ornamental blue fescue grass) - many cultivars
- Festuca idahoensis (Idaho fescue, blue bunchgrass)
- Festuca ovina (sheep's fescue) - many cultivars
- Festuca rubra (creeping fescue grass, red fescue, red fescue grass) - many cultivars
- Helictotrichon sempervirens AGM (blue oat grass) - several cultivars
- Leymus condensatus (giant wildrye, canyon prince, wild blue rye)
- Melica imperfecta (smallflower melic, little California melic)
- Miscanthus sinensis (Chinese silver grass, eulalia, eulaia grass, maiden grass, zebra grass, Susuki grass, porcupine grass) - numerous cultivars, several with AGMs
- Muhlenbergia rigens (deer grass)
- Panicum virgatum (switchgrass)
- Pennisetum alopecuroides (Chinese fountain grass, Chinese pennisetum, fountain grass, swamp foxtail grass) - many cultivars
- Pennisetum setaceum AGM & P. setaceum 'Rubrum' AGM (red fountain grass, African fountain grass, fountain grass, purple fountain grass, ruby grass) - & several other cultivars
- Pennisetum villosum AGM (feathertop)
- Stipa gigantea AGM (golden oats)
- Stipa tenuissima syn. Nassella tenuissima (Mexican feather grass, Texas needle grass)

=== Sedges ===
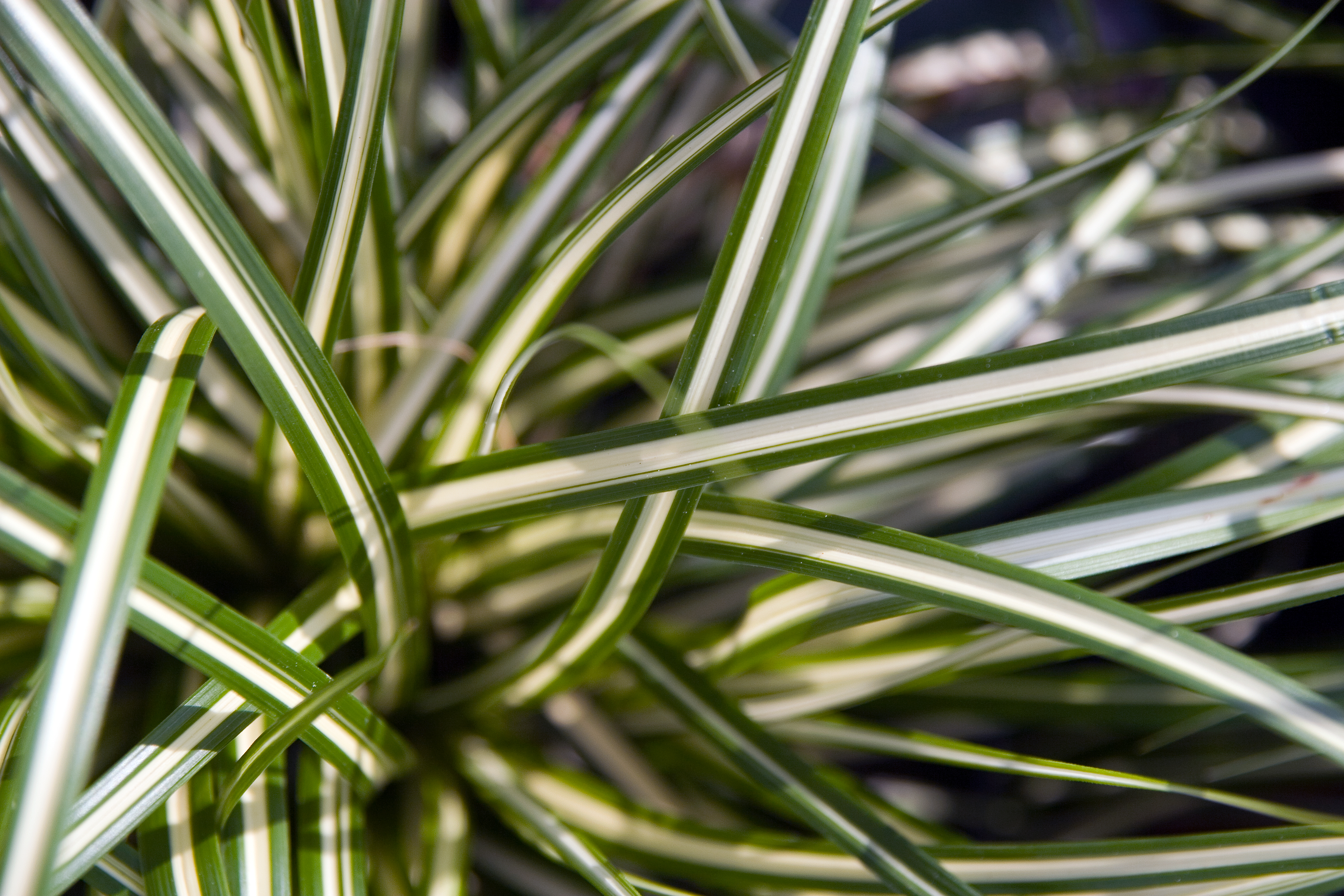
Carex oshimensis 'Evergold'

- Carex comans (New Zealand hair sedge) - many cultivars
- Carex elata 'Aurea' AGM (Bowles' golden sedge)
- Carex flacca (syn. C. glauca) (blue sedge, gray carex, glaucous sedge, or carnation-grass)
- Carex oshimensis - Evergold AGM
- Carex pansa (sand dune sedge)
- Carex pendula (pendulous, hanging, drooping or weeping sedge) - & cultivars
- Carex praegracilis (clustered field sedge, field sedge, expressway sedge)
- Carex siderosticta (creeping broad-leafed sedge) - several cultivars
- Carex spissa (San Diego sedge)
- Carex several other species & cultivars (including Japanese sedges & others)
- Uncinia rubra (red hook sedge)

=== Environmental impact ===
Some ornamental grasses have become serious invasive weeds, usually as garden escapes into natural vegetation areas.

== Images ==
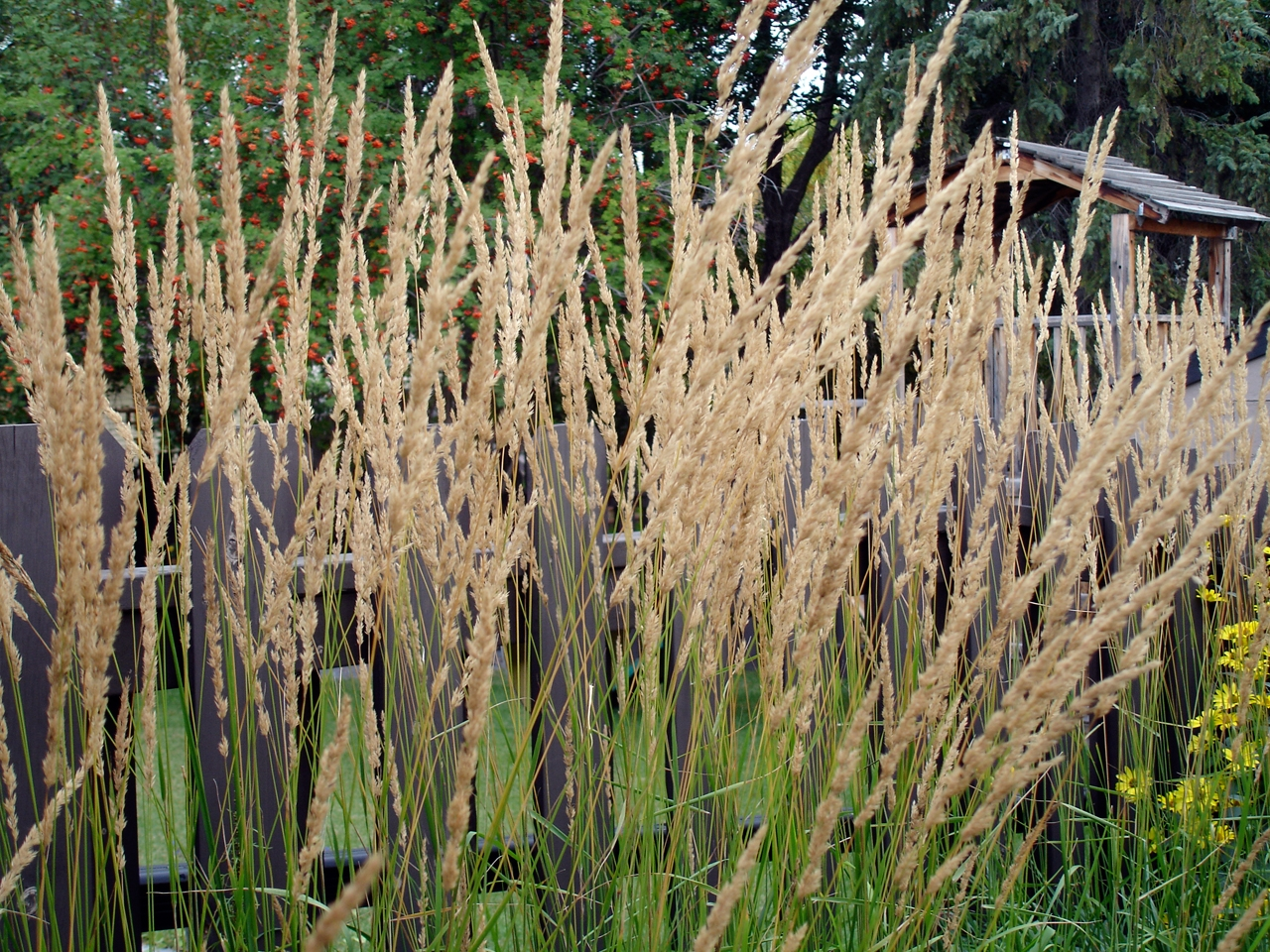

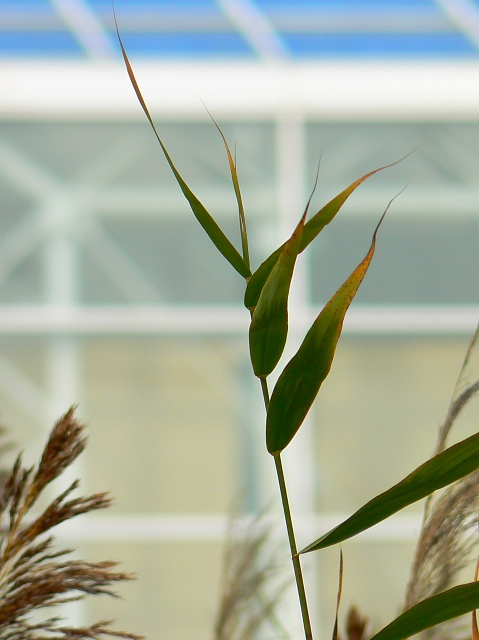

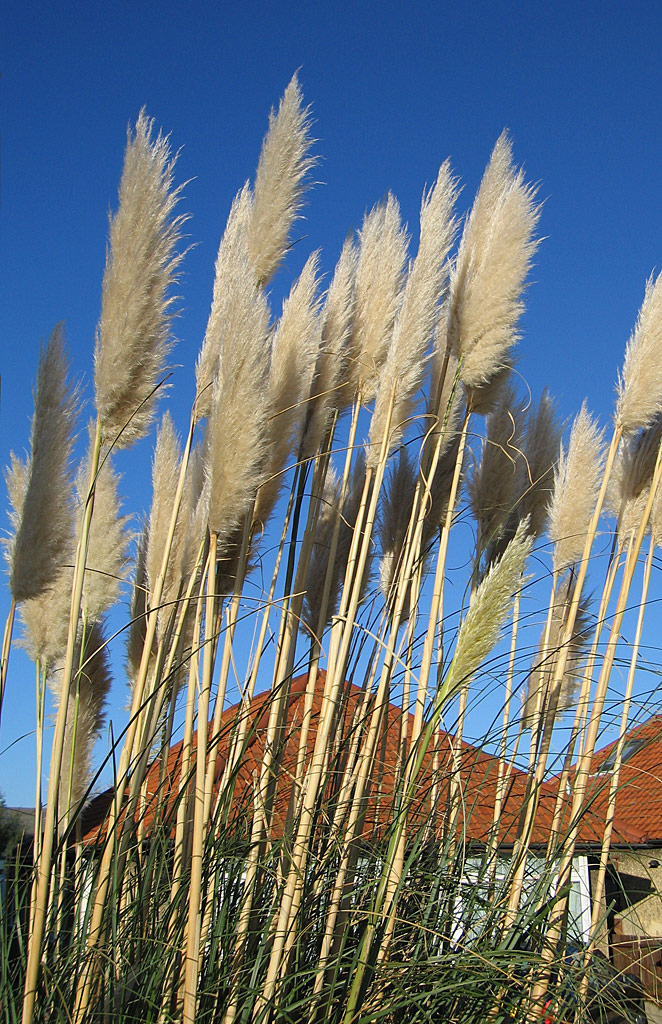

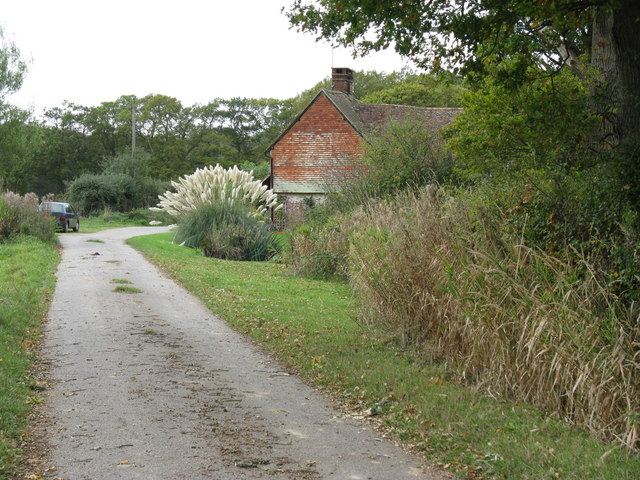

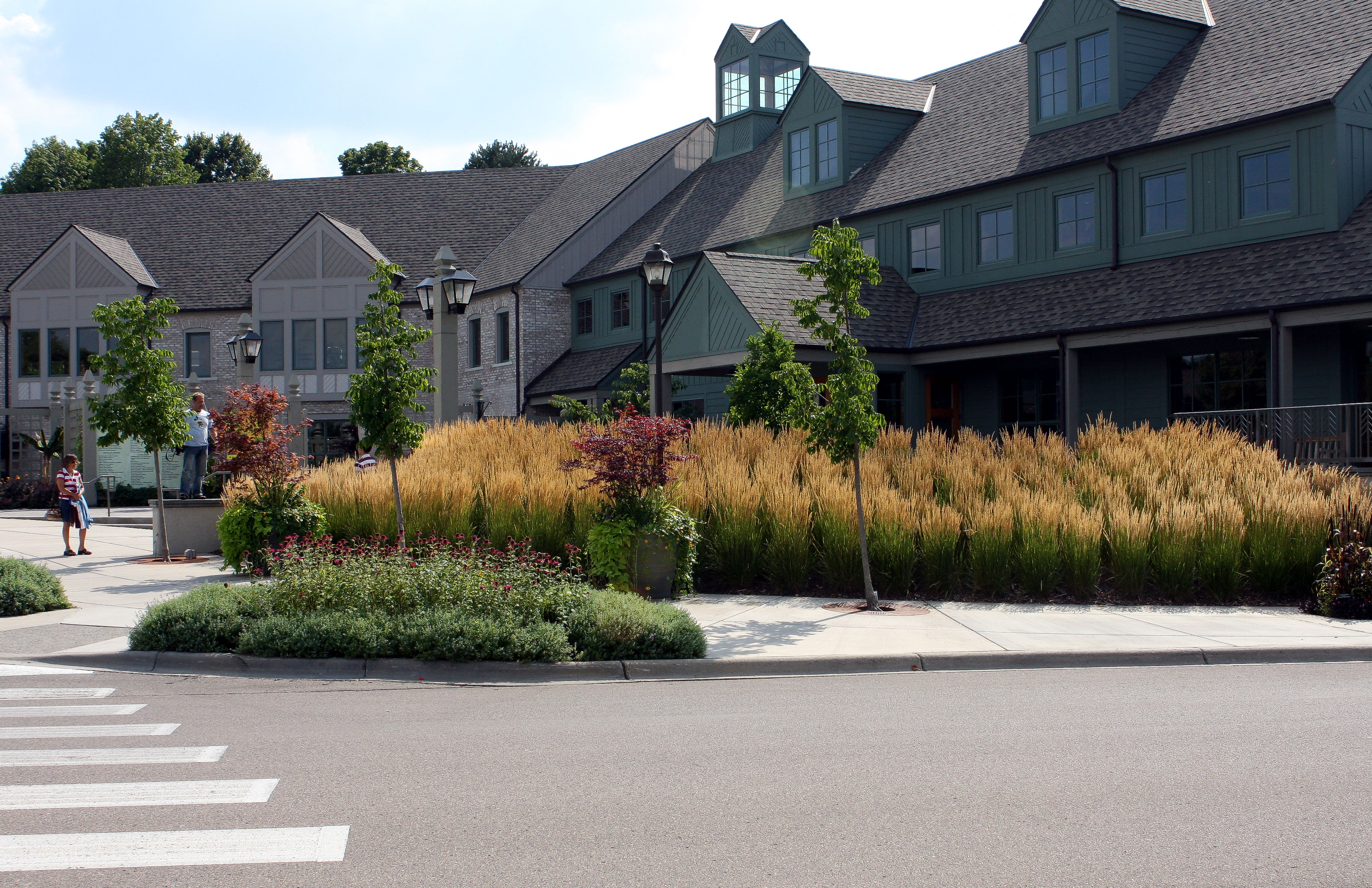

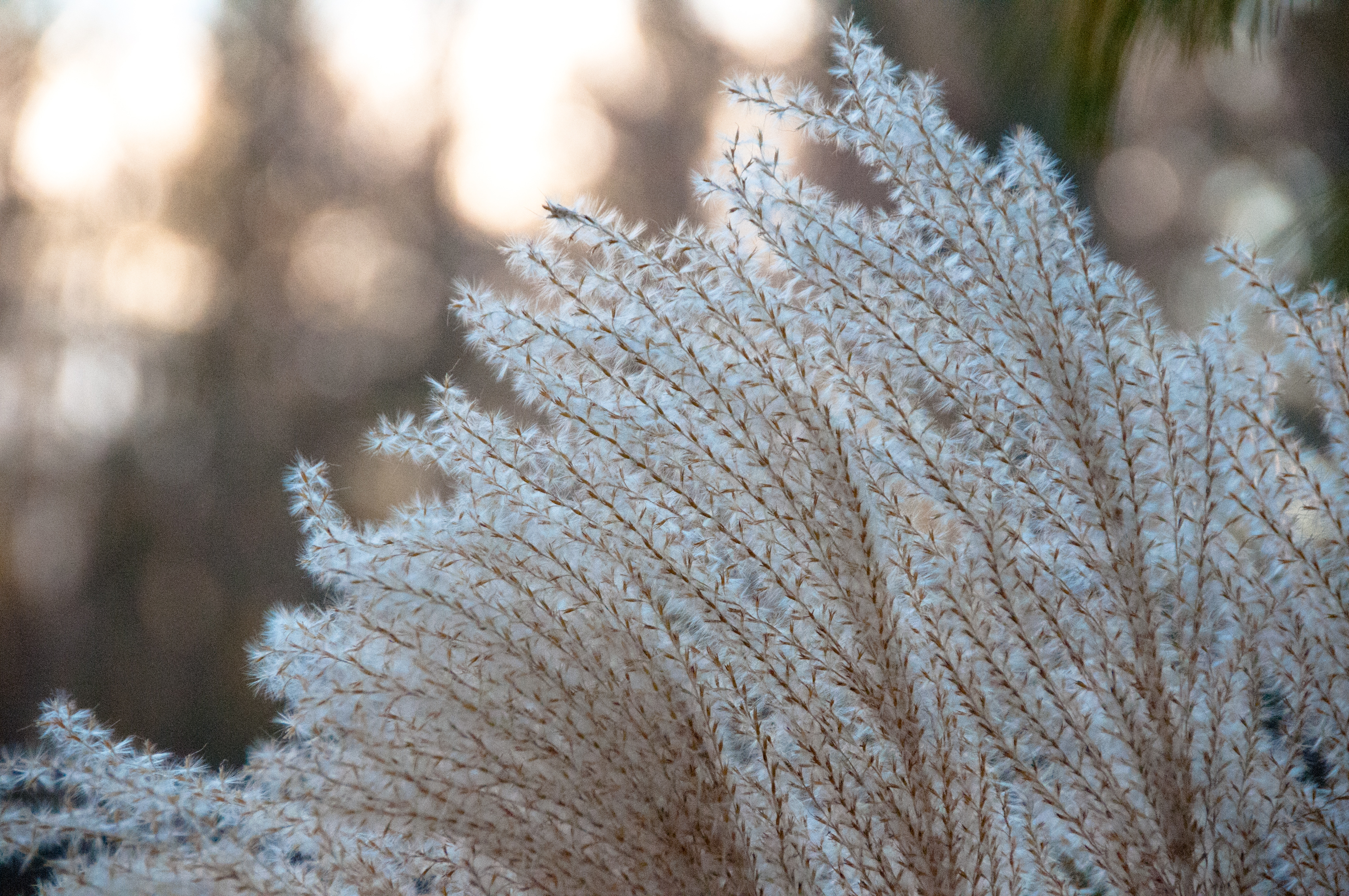

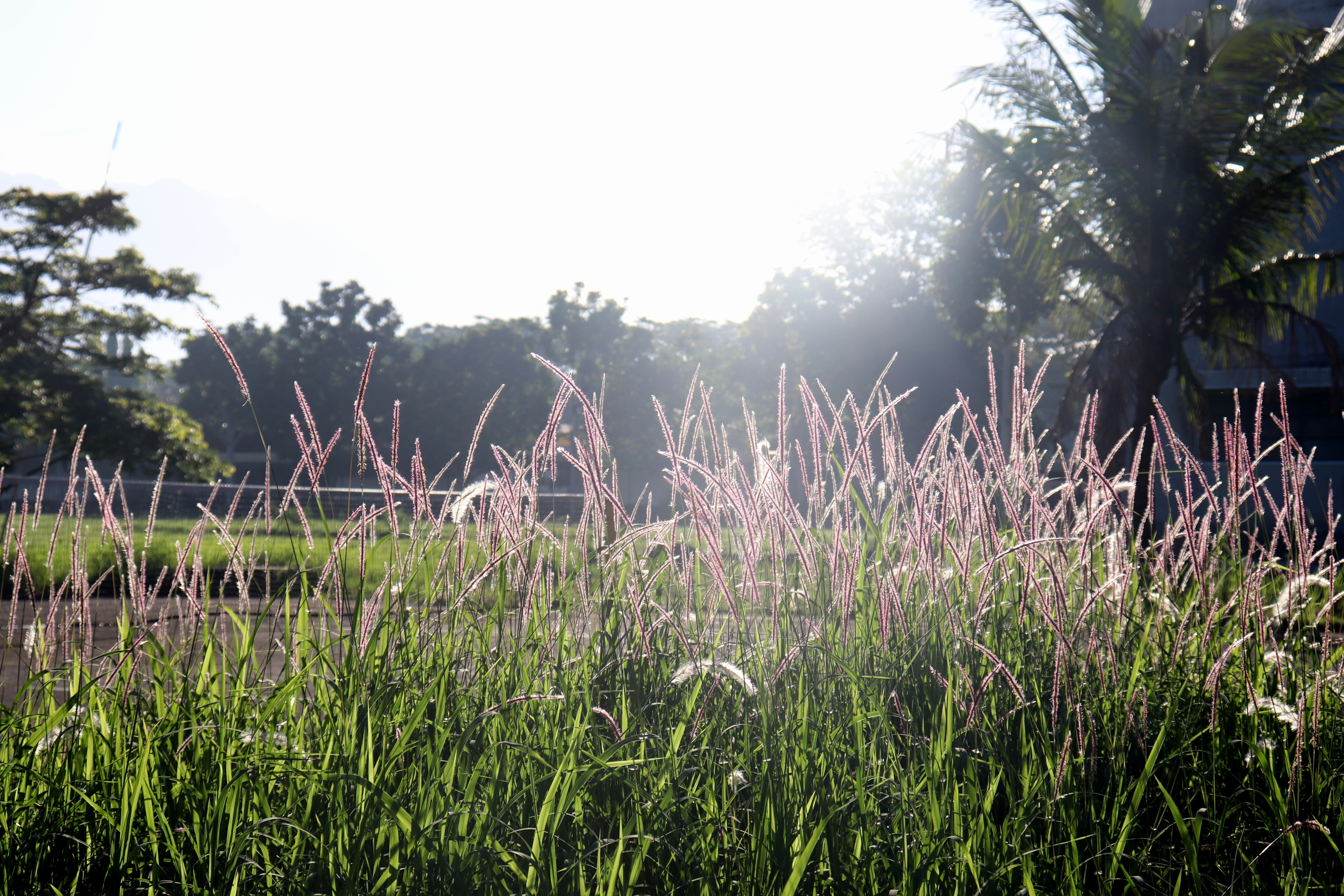
