= Pseudodanthonia =

Scientific classification
- Kingdom: Plantae
- Clade: Tracheophytes
- Clade: Angiosperms
- Clade: Monocots
- Clade: Commelinids
- Order: Poales
- Family: Poaceae
- Subfamily: Pooideae
- Tribe: Duthieeae
- Genus: Pseudodanthonia; Bor & C.E.Hubb.
- Species: P. himalaica

Binomial name
- Pseudodanthonia himalaica (Hook.f.) Bor & C.E.Hubb.

Synonyms
- Danthonia himalaica Hook.f.

Genus of grasses

Pseudodanthonia is a genus of Himalayan plants in the grass family. The only known species is Pseudodanthonia himalaica, native to Uttarakhand and Uttar Pradesh in northern India

== See also ==
- Sinochasea trigyna, formerly Pseudodanthonia trigyna
