= Heuffelia =

Heuffelia may refer to two different genera of plants:

- Heuffelia Schur, a taxonomic synonym for the alpine oatgrass genus Helictotrichon
- Heuffelia Opiz, a taxonomic synonym for the sedge genus Carex
