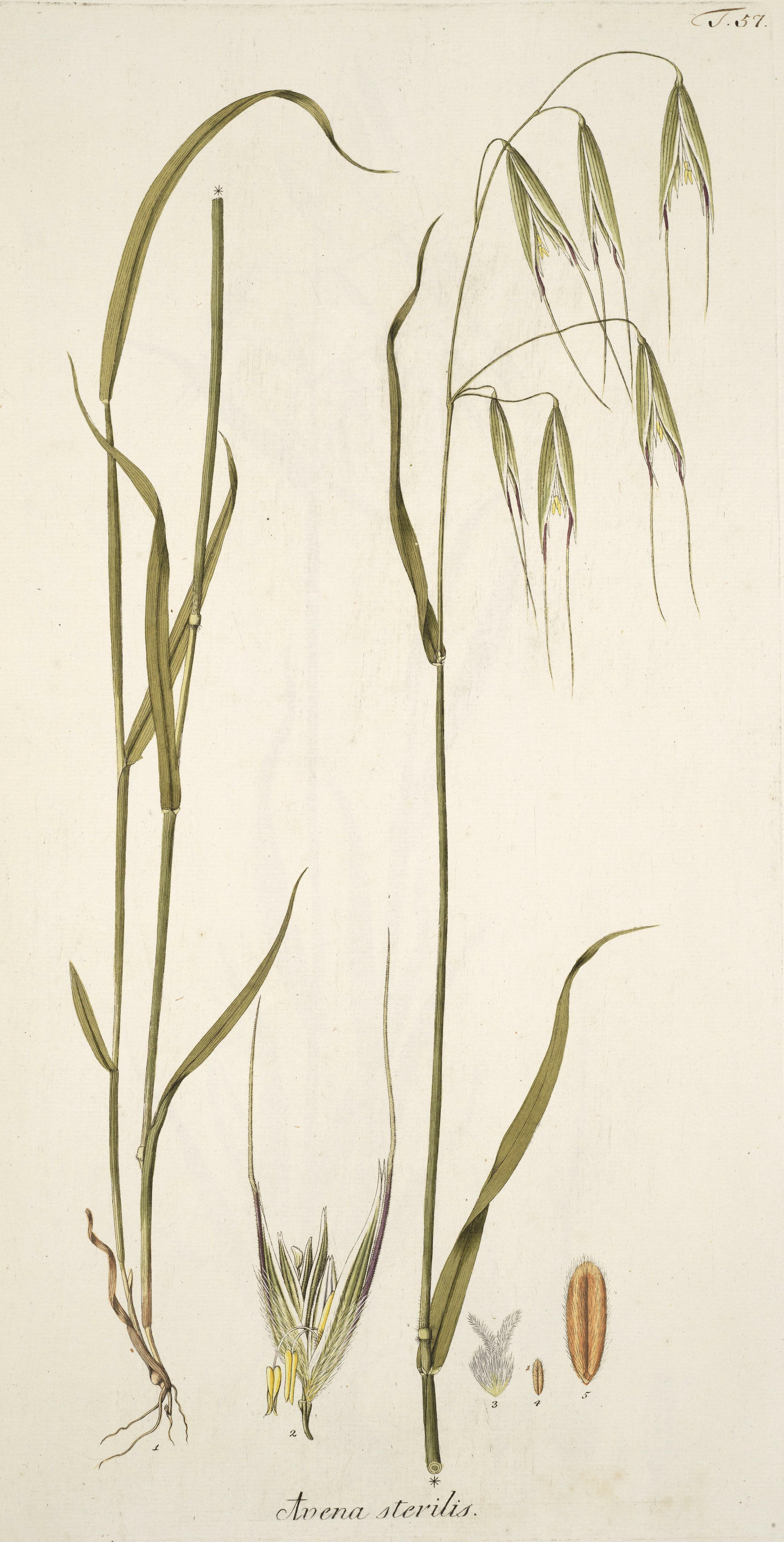

Conservation status
- Least Concern (IUCN 3.1)

Scientific classification
- Kingdom: Plantae
- Clade: Embryophytes
- Clade: Tracheophytes
- Clade: Angiosperms
- Clade: Monocots
- Clade: Commelinids
- Order: Poales
- Family: Poaceae
- Subfamily: Pooideae
- Genus: Avena
- Species: A. sterilis

Binomial name
- Avena sterilis L.

= Avena sterilis =

Winter wild oat

Species of grass

Avena sterilis (animated oat, sterile oat, wild oat, wild red oat, winter wild oat; syn. Avena ludoviciana Durieu; Avena macrocarpa Moench; Avena sterilis ssp. sterilis; Avena sterilis ssp. ludoviciana) is a species of grass weed whose seeds are edible. Many common names of this plant refer to the movement of its panicle in the wind.

== Description ==
=== Appearance ===
Avena sterilis is a stout, broad-leaved grass that grows up to 1.5 m (4 ft 11 in) tall. At maturity, it has leaf blades that are up to 60 cm (24 in) long, and 6–14 mm (0.24–0.55 in) wide.

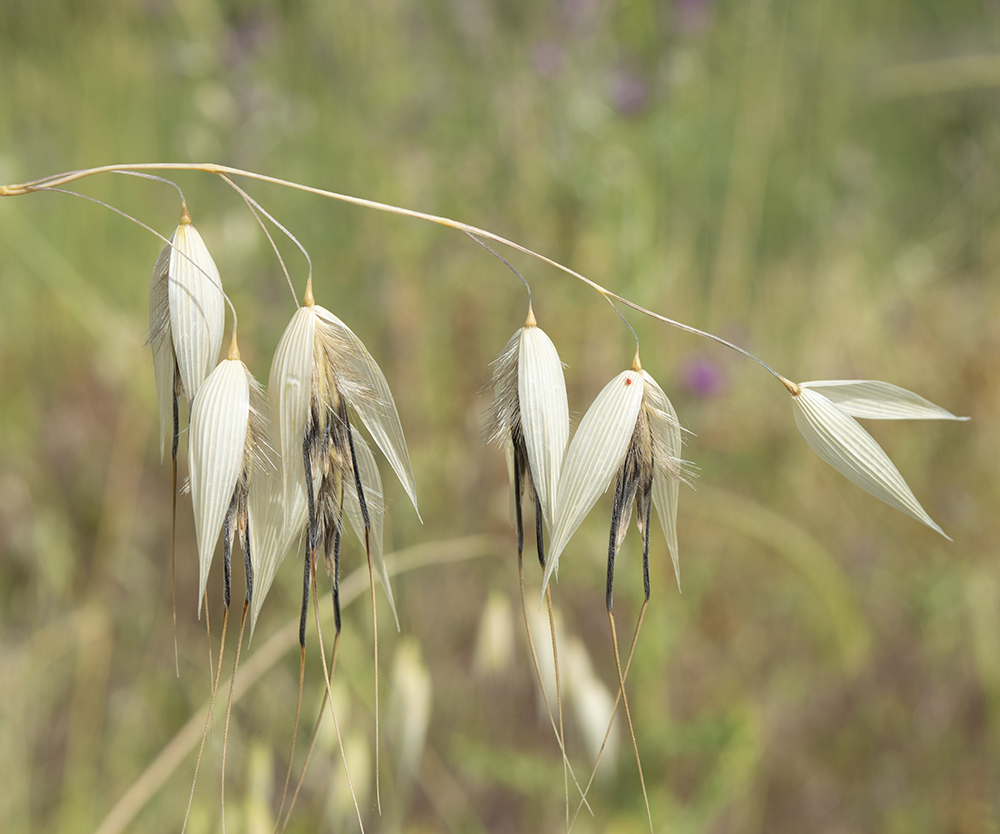
Florets

It has an inflorescence that is either an equilateral or a slightly one-sided panicle. The spikelets usually have 3 florets, but can have anywhere from 2 to 5. The spikelets (without awns) are 1.7–4.5 cm (0.67–1.77 in) long; the glumes are 2.4–5 cm (0.94–1.97 in) long.

The florets can either be a straw yellow or slightly reddish in colour. Occasionally, there can be reddish hairs at the base of the floret.

The lemma is usually 1.5–4 cm (0.59–1.57 in) long. The florets are elongate and taper at the top. The two florets closest to the glumes have a twisted dorsal awn that is 3–9 cm (1.2–3.5 in) long.

=== Varieties and subspecies ===
One can distinguish between the two subspecies, A. sterilis sterilis and A. sterilis ludoviciana, using the size of the reproductive parts of the flower.

A study of 139 populations of A. sterilis L. in Spain revealed 6 varieties based on morphological classifications, though no new subspecies were formally described.

=== Reproduction ===
A. sterilis is hexaploid. It is an annual plant, with a life cycle that mirrors many cereal crops. While an individual plant is capable of producing as many as 200 seeds, the average seed production of a single plant is 13-21 seeds. Seeds regularly live in the soil for upwards of two years, and can survive for as many as 5 years prior to germination.

=== Distribution ===
A. sterilis is native to the Mediterranean Basin and West, Central and South Asia, but is widely naturalized elsewhere. The species grows on all continents except Antarctica.

In North America, it grows as an introduced species in the U.S. states of California, Oregon, New Jersey, Ohio, Pennsylvania, and the Canadian provinces of Ontario and Quebec.

=== Pests and pathogens ===
A. sterilis is a host to the pathogenic nematode Ditylenchus dipsaci. It is a host to the protist plant pathogen Sclerophthora macrospora. It is also a wild host to Petrobia latens, commonly known as the brown wheat mite. It is susceptible to two widespread diseases that infect Avena species, oat crown rust and stem rust. It is also susceptible to the wheat dwarf virus.

== Relationship to humans ==
=== Ancestor of domesticated oats ===
Genetic analysis has shown that A. sterilis grass indigenous to Southwest Asia, and modern Iran, Iraq, and Turkey is the progenitor of domesticated oat crops such as A. sativa and A. byzantina.. Its protein content may be as high as 30%.

=== Modern agricultural weed ===
A. sterilis produces seeds that are difficult to separate from grain. Because of this, its seeds have spread around the world as a contaminant in wool, cereal grain, and seed.

Because it thrives in the same conditions as many agricultural crops and has similar lifecycles, the grass directly competes with and reduces yield in arable crops.

Castillejo-González et al., 2014 locate A. sterilis infested fields with almost perfect accuracy using QuickBird (satellite imagery) and various image classifiers.

=== Herbicide resistance ===
Avena sterilis ssp. ludoviciana with multiple herbicide resistance - at 2 sites of action (SOAs) - was first observed in Kermanshah, Khuzestan, Iran, in winter wheat cultivation in 2010. These populations are known to be resistant to clodinafop-propargyl, iodosulfuron-methyl-sodium, and mesosulfuron-methyl.

Resistance to fenoxaprop-P-ethyl in Asl (and A. fatua) has evolved in several fields in England. Although these Asl and A. fatua are also hybridising, it remains unproven if this is why they both have resistance, or in which direction this has occurred.

A. sterilis populations in Greece are almost all resistant to diclofop but susceptible to most other herbicides, including others of the same MOA (i.e., AACase inhibitors). However, most Greek populations do have diclofop resistance and some other resistance to at least one other herbicide.
