= Stephanachne =

Scientific classification
- Kingdom: Plantae
- Clade: Tracheophytes
- Clade: Angiosperms
- Clade: Monocots
- Clade: Commelinids
- Order: Poales
- Family: Poaceae
- Subfamily: Pooideae
- Tribe: Duthieeae
- Genus: Stephanachne; Keng
- Species: S. nigrescens

Binomial name
- Stephanachne nigrescens Keng

Genus of grasses

Stephanachne is a genus of Asian plants in the grass family. It contains a single species, Stephanachne nigrescens, a perennial grass native to north-central, south-central, and western China (Gansu, Qinghai, Shaanxi, and Sichuan).

== Formerly placed here ==
- Pappagrostis pappophorea (Hack.) Roshev. (as Stephanachne monandra (P.C.Kuo & S.L.Lu) P.C.Kuo & S.L.Lu and S. pappophorea (Hack.) Keng)
