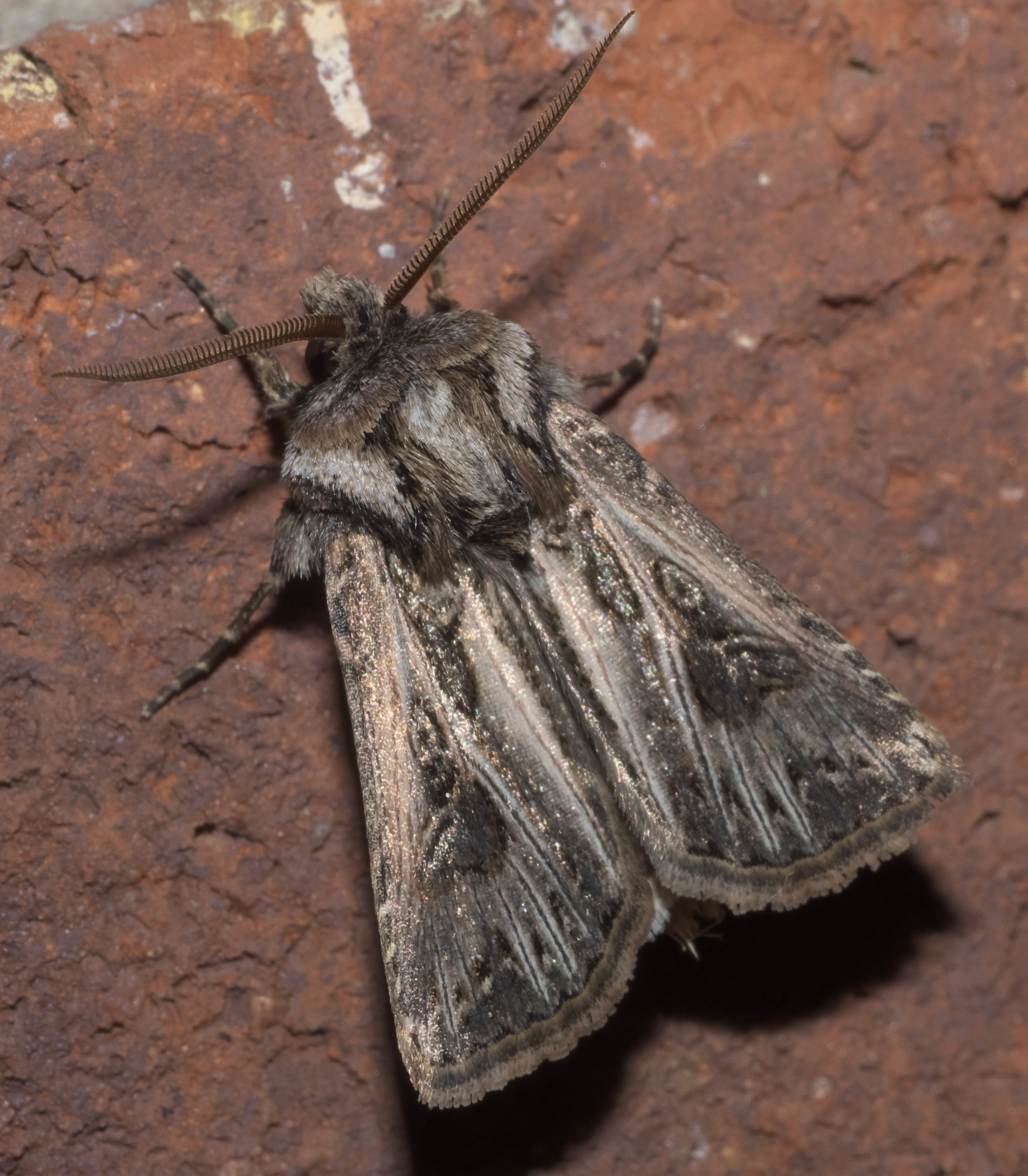

Scientific classification
- Kingdom: Animalia
- Phylum: Arthropoda
- Clade: Pancrustacea
- Class: Insecta
- Order: Lepidoptera
- Superfamily: Noctuoidea
- Family: Noctuidae
- Genus: Agrotis
- Species: A. gladiaria

Binomial name
- Agrotis gladiaria Morrison, 1875

Synonyms
- Agrotis morrisoniana

= Agrotis gladiaria =

Species of moth

Agrotis gladiaria, the swordsman dart or claybacked cutworm, is a moth of the family Noctuidae. It is found in south-eastern Canada from Nova Scotia to Ontario and in the United States from Maine to the panhandle of Florida, west to eastern Texas, eastern Kansas, eastern Nebraska, southern Wisconsin and Michigan.

The length of the forewings is 13–16 mm. Adults are on wing from September to October depending on the location.

The larvae feed on a wide range of plants, including Medicago sativa, Asteraceae, Fabaceae, Rubus, Poa, Andropogon, Brassica oleracea, Trifolium, Zea mays, Solidago, Hordeum pusillum, Avena, Allium, Ipomoea batatas, Nicotiana and Solanum lycopersicum.
