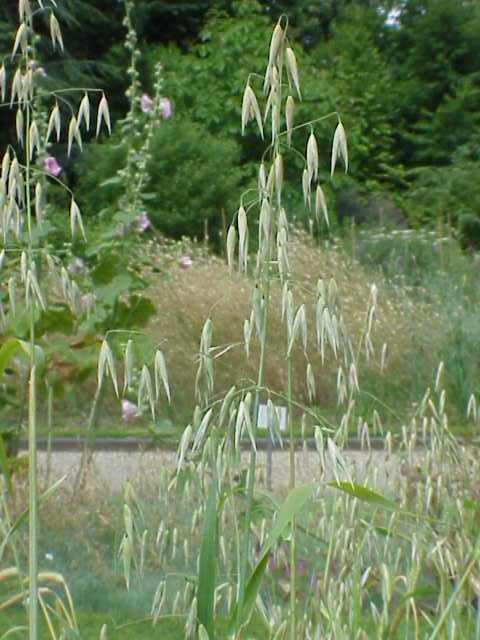
- Common wild oat (Avena fatua)

Scientific classification
- Kingdom: Plantae
- Clade: Embryophytes
- Clade: Tracheophytes
- Clade: Angiosperms
- Clade: Monocots
- Clade: Commelinids
- Order: Poales
- Family: Poaceae
- Subfamily: Pooideae
- Supertribe: Poodae
- Tribe: Poeae
- Subtribe: Aveninae
- Genus: Avena; L. 1753 not Scop. 1777 nor Thell. 1911

Type species
- Avena sativa L.

Synonyms
- Preissia Corda; Anelytrum Hack.

= Avena =

Oats

Genus of grasses oat

Avena is a genus of Eurasian and African plants in the grass family. Collectively known as the oats, they include some species which have been cultivated for thousands of years as a food source for humans and livestock. They are widespread throughout Europe, Asia and northwest Africa. Several species have become naturalized in many parts of the world, and are regarded as invasive weeds where they compete with crop production. All oats have edible seeds, though they are small and hard to harvest in most species.

== Ecology ==
Avena species, including cultivated oats, are used as food plants by the larvae of some Lepidoptera species, including rustic shoulder-knot and setaceous Hebrew character.

Like most terrestrial plants, oats have symbiotic relationships with arbuscular mycorrhizal fungi (AMF). AMF help oats to better handle drought and other abiotic stresses. Studies have shown that inoculation with AMF increased oat yields in drought conditions.

For diseases of oats, see List of oat diseases.

== Species ==
=== Cultivated oats ===
One species is of major commercial importance as a cereal grain. Four other species are grown as crops of minor or regional importance.

- Avena sativa – the common oat, a cereal crop of global importance and the species commonly referred to as "oats"
- Avena abyssinica – the Ethiopian oat, native to Ethiopia, Eritrea, and Djibouti; naturalized in Yemen and Saudi Arabia
- Avena byzantina – a minor crop in Greece and the Middle East; introduced in Spain, Algeria, India, New Zealand, South America, etc.
- Avena nuda – the naked oat or hulless oat, which plays much the same role in Europe as does A. abyssinica in Ethiopia. It is sometimes included in A. sativa and was widely grown in Europe before the latter replaced it. As its nutrient content is somewhat better than that of the common oat, A. nuda has increased in significance in recent years, especially in organic farming.
- Avena strigosa – the lopsided oat, bristle oat, or black oat, grown for fodder in parts of Western Europe and Brazil

=== Wild oats ===
Several species of Avena occur in the wild, sometimes as weeds in agricultural fields. They are known as wild oats or oat-grasses. Those growing alongside cultivated oats in agricultural fields are considered nuisance weeds, as, being grasses like the crop, they are difficult to remove chemically; any standard herbicide that would kill them would also damage the crop. A specific herbicide must be used. The costs of this herbicide and the length of time it must be used to reduce the weed are significant, with seeds able to lie dormant for up to 10 years.

- Avena aemulans – European Russia
- Avena barbata – slender wild oat – from Portugal and Morocco to Tajikistan
- Avena brevis – short oat – central and southern Europe
- Avena chinensis – Germany and Austria; introduced in China and Belarus
- Avena clauda – Balkans, Middle East, and Central Asia
- Avena eriantha – North Africa, Middle East, Central Asia, Caucasus
- Avena fatua – common wild oat – Europe, Asia, North Africa; naturalized in Australia, the Americas, and various islands
- Avena longiglumis – Algeria, Egypt, Israel, Libya, Morocco, Palestine, Portugal, Sardinia, Spain, Tunisia
- Avena maroccana – Moroccan oat – Morocco
- Avena murphyi – Morocco and Spain
- Avena prostrata – Morocco and Spain
- Avena saxatilis – Sicily and small nearby islands
- Avena sterilis – winter wild oat – Mediterranean, East Africa, and temperate Asia; introduced in northern Europe, Australia, New Zealand, and the Americas
- Avena strigosa – Spain, France, Portugal; introduced in other parts of Europe as well as in scattered locations in Australia, New Zealand, the Americas
- Avena vaviloviana – Eritrea and Ethiopia
- Avena ventricosa – North Africa and Middle East
- Avena volgensis – European Russia

=== Species formerly included ===
Hundreds of taxa have been included in Avena at one time in the past but are now considered better suited to other genera, including:

- Agrostis
- Aira
- Ampelodesmos
- Anisopogon
- Arrhenatherum
- Avenula
- Bromus
- Calamagrostis
- Capeochloa
- Centropodia
- Corynephorus
- Danthonia
- Danthoniastrum
- Deschampsia
- Festuca
- Gaudinia
- Helictochloa
- Helictotrichon
- Hierochloe
- Lachnagrostis
- Lolium
- Parapholis
- Pentameris
- Periballia
- Peyritschia
- Rytidosperma
- Schizachne
- Sphenopholis
- Stipa
- Stipagrostis
- Tenaxia
- Tricholemma
- Triraphis
- Trisetaria
- Trisetum
- Tristachya
- Ventenata

== Sociolinguistics ==
"Sowing wild oats" is a phrase used since at least the 16th century; it appears in a 1542 tract by Thomas Beccon, a Protestant clergyman from Norfolk. Apparently, a similar expression was used in Roman Republican times, possibly by Plautus. The origin of the expression is the fact that wild oats, notably A. fatua, are a major weed in oat farming.

Among European cereal grains, oats are hardest to tell apart from their weedy relatives, which look almost alike but yield little grain. The life cycle of A. fatua is nearly synchronous with that of common oat, and their relationship is an example of Vavilovian mimicry. Historically, growers could control the weed only by checking the crop plants one by one and hand-weeding. Consequently, "sowing wild oats" became a phrase to describe unprofitable activities.

Given the reputation of oat grain to have invigorating properties and the obvious connection between plant seeds and human "seed", it is not surprising that the meaning of the phrase became a reference to the liaisons of an unmarried young male, which result in unwanted children born out of wedlock.

== See also ==
- List of Poaceae genera
