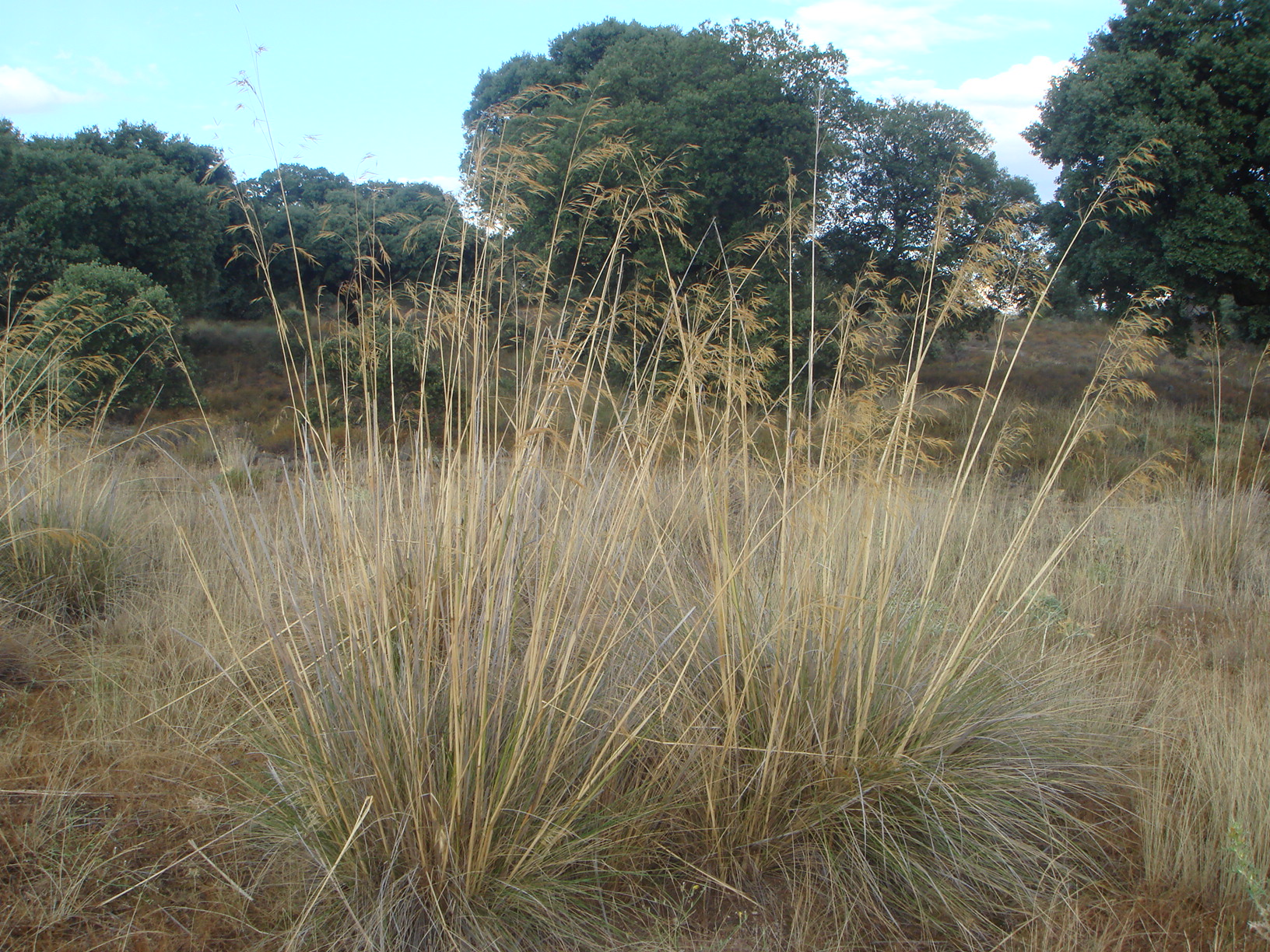

Scientific classification
- Kingdom: Plantae
- Clade: Tracheophytes
- Clade: Angiosperms
- Clade: Monocots
- Clade: Commelinids
- Order: Poales
- Family: Poaceae
- Subfamily: Pooideae
- Genus: Celtica; F.M.Vázquez & Barkworth
- Species: C. gigantea

Binomial name
- Celtica gigantea (Link) F.M.Vázquez & Barkworth

Synonyms
- Species synonymy: Lasiagrostis gigantea (Link) Trin. & Rupr.; Macrochloa gigantea (Link) Hack.; Stipa gigantea Link

= Celtica gigantea =

Species of grass

Celtica gigantea, commonly called giant feather grass, giant needle grass or golden-oats, is a species of flowering plant in the grass family, Poaceae, native to the Iberian Peninsula and Morocco. Despite being renamed and placed within the genus Celtica, it is still widely referred to—both in horticultural literature and amongst gardeners—by its synonym, Stipa gigantea.

== Description ==
Celtica gigantea is a bunchgrass with leaf blades that are narrow and gray-green, creating a bunchgrass foliage mass 2–3 feet (0.61–0.91 m) in diameter. It is evergreen to semi-evergreen, depending on the climate.

The plant has prominent flower spikes emerging silver-lavender in the late spring, aging to a radiant golden over the summer, and persisting in tan into winter. The spikes typically grow to 8 feet (2.4 m) tall, rising high above the foliage.

== Cultivation ==
Celtica gigantea is grown as an ornamental grass for planting as single specimens and massed drifts in parks, public landscapes, and gardens. It is used in drought tolerant and Mediterranean climate—plant palette gardens.

The tall golden flower spikes are attractive on the plant, especially radiant when backlit by the sun. They may also be used for dried flowers.

Under the synonym Stipa gigantea this plant and the cultivar 'Gold Fontaene' have won the Royal Horticultural Society's Award of Garden Merit.

== See also ==
- Ornamental grasses
