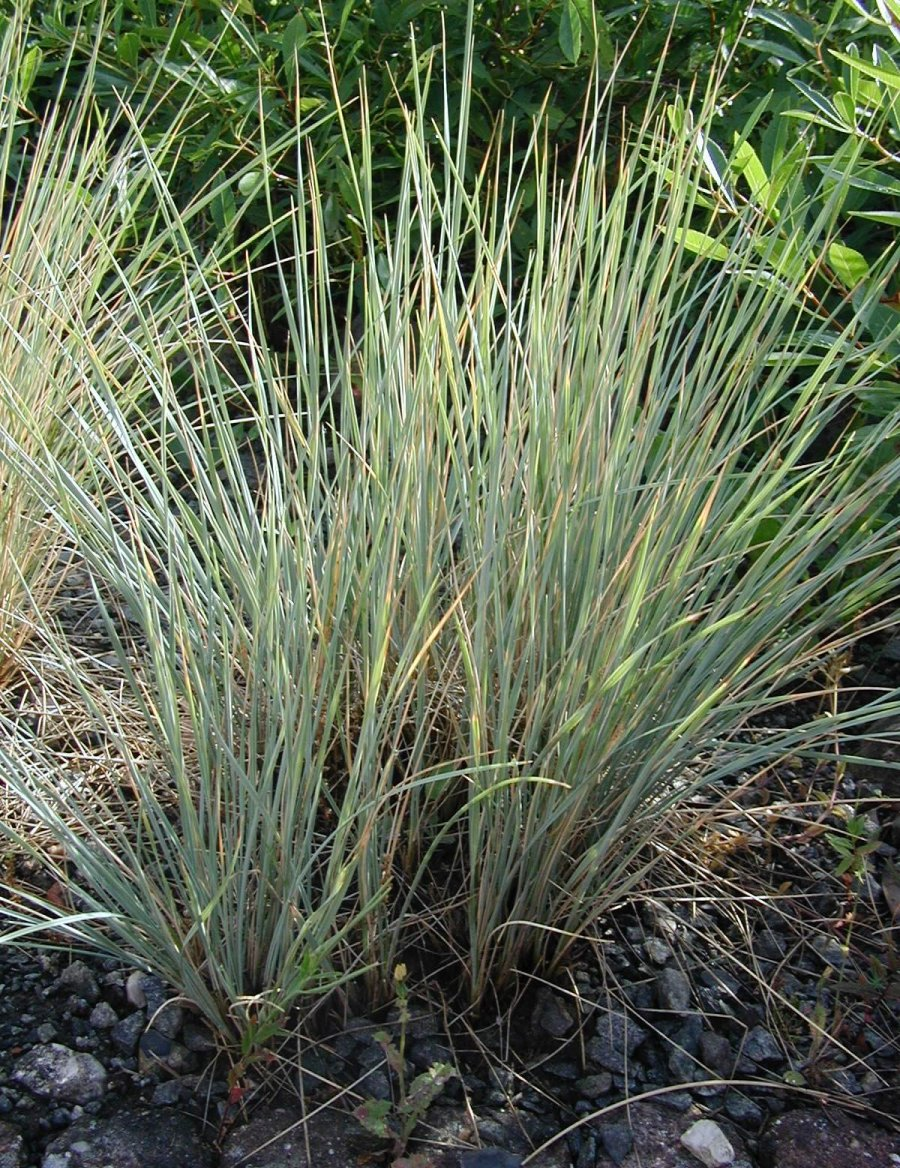

Scientific classification
- Kingdom: Plantae
- Clade: Tracheophytes
- Clade: Angiosperms
- Clade: Monocots
- Clade: Commelinids
- Order: Poales
- Family: Poaceae
- Subfamily: Pooideae
- Genus: Helictotrichon
- Species: H. sempervirens

Binomial name
- Helictotrichon sempervirens (Vill.) Pilg.

Synonyms
- Avena notarisii Parl. Avena sempervirens Vill.

= Helictotrichon sempervirens =

Species of grass

Helictotrichon sempervirens, the blue oat grass, is a species of flowering plant in the true grass family, Poaceae, native to central and southwest European grasslands. It is a bunchgrass often used as an ornamental grass in garden design and landscaping.

The foliage is pale green with a hint of blue. It grows in an arching shape, up to 140 cm (55 in) tall by 60 cm (24 in) wide. The grass blooms with pale blue-green flowers in May to August. The plant is an evergreen perennial, although with summer drought stress semi-dormancy occurs. The Latin name sempervirens literally means "immortal" but in botany means "evergreen".

This plant has gained the Royal Horticultural Society's Award of Garden Merit.
