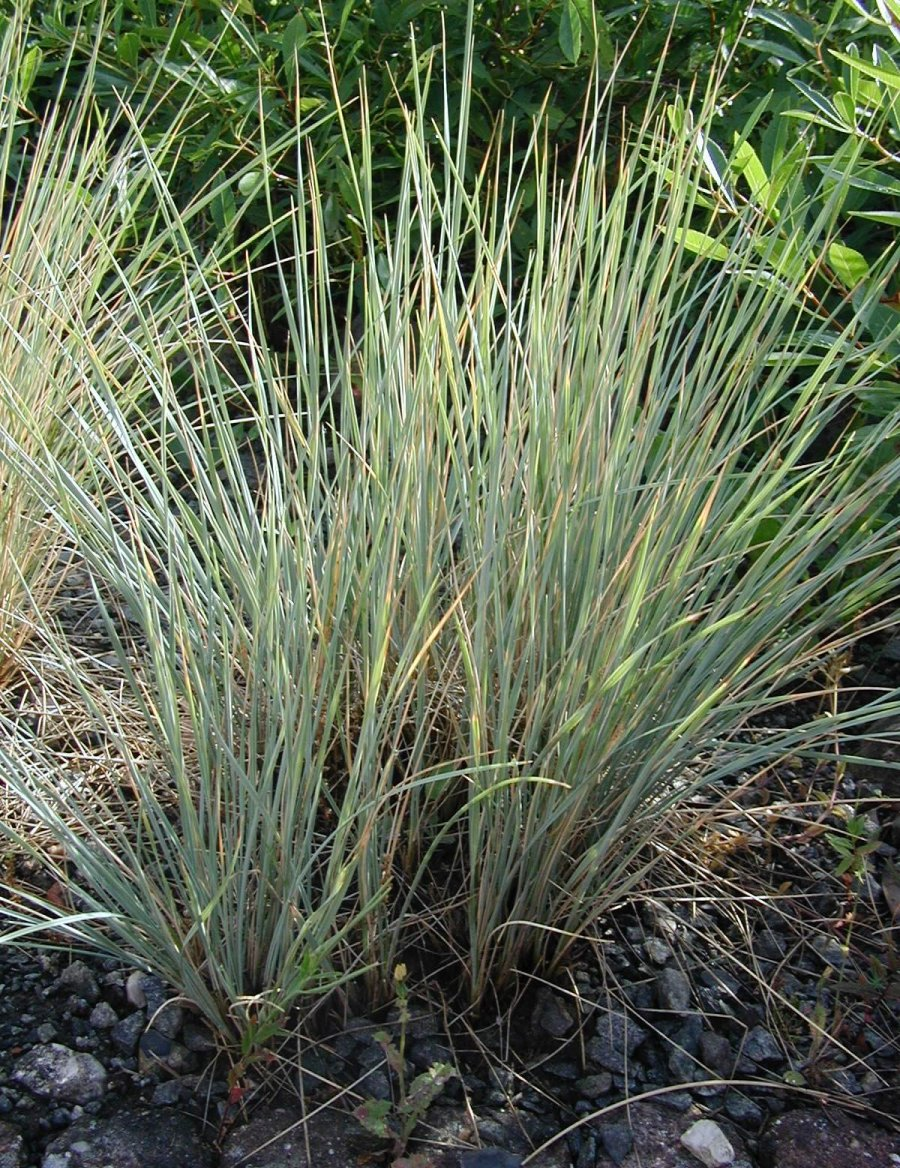
- Helictotrichon sempervirens

Scientific classification
- Kingdom: Plantae
- Clade: Tracheophytes
- Clade: Angiosperms
- Clade: Monocots
- Clade: Commelinids
- Order: Poales
- Family: Poaceae
- Subfamily: Pooideae
- Supertribe: Poodae
- Tribe: Poeae
- Subtribe: Aveninae
- Genus: Helictotrichon; Besser

Type species
- Helictotrichon sempervirens (Vill.) Pilg.

Synonyms
- Aristavena F.Albers & Butzin; Avenastrum (K.Koch) Opiz; Avenochloa Holub; Danthorhiza Ten.; Elictotrichon Besser ex Andrz.; Heuffelia Schur; Neoholubia Tzvelev; Stipavena Vierh.

= Helictotrichon =

Genus of grasses

Helictotrichon, or alpine oatgrass, is a genus of perennial flowering plants in the grass family. The genus name comes from the Greek heliktos meaning twisted, and trichos meaning hair, referring to the shape of the awn.

Most of the species are native to Africa and Eurasia with a few species in North America. Helictotrichon sempervirens is widely cultivated as an ornamental.

Species

- Helictotrichon altius (Hitchc.) Ohwi - China
- Helictotrichon angustum C.E.Hubb. - Kenya, Yemen
- Helictotrichon arctum Cope - Yemen
- Helictotrichon barbatum (Nees) Schweick. - South Africa
- Helictotrichon burmanicum Bor - Myanmar
- Helictotrichon cantabricum (Lag.) Gervais - Pyrenees in France + Spain
- Helictotrichon capense Schweick. - South Africa
- Helictotrichon convolutum (C.Presl) Henrard - Italy, Greece, Balkans, Turkey, Syria, Lebanon
- Helictotrichon cycladum (Rech.f. & T.C.Scheff.) Rech.f. - Greece incl Crete
- Helictotrichon decorum (Janka) Henrard - Romania
- Helictotrichon delavayi (Hack.) Henrard - China
- Helictotrichon desertorum (Less.) Nevski - Austria, Czech Rep, Ukraine, Russia, Kazakhstan, Kyrgyzstan, Mongolia
- Helictotrichon devesae Romero Zarco - Spain
- Helictotrichon dodii (Stapf) Schweick. - South Africa
- Helictotrichon elongatum (Hochst. ex A.Rich.) C.E.Hubb. - Madagascar; Africa from Chad to Eritrea to Zimbabwe
- Helictotrichon fedtschenkoi (Hack.) Henrard - Kyrgyzstan, Tajikistan
- Helictotrichon filifolium (Lag.) Henrard - Spain, Morocco, Algeria
- Helictotrichon galpinii Schweick. - South Africa, Lesotho
- Helictotrichon hideoi (Honda) Ohwi - Japan, Taiwan
- Helictotrichon hirtulum (Steud.) Schweick. - South Africa, Lesotho
- Helictotrichon hissaricum (Roshev.) Henrard - Tajikistan
- Helictotrichon imberbe (Nees) Veldkamp - South Africa, Lesotho, Eswatini
- Helictotrichon junghuhnii (Buse) Henrard - China, Indian Subcontinent, Myanmar, Sumatra, Java, New Guinea
- Helictotrichon × krischae H.Melzer - Austria
- Helictotrichon krylovii (Pavlov) Henrard - Yakutia, Magadan
- Helictotrichon lachnanthum (Hochst. ex A.Rich.) C.E.Hubb. - Bioko, Ethiopia, Tanzania, Kenya, Uganda
- Helictotrichon leianthum (Keng) Ohwi - China
- Helictotrichon leoninum (Steud.) Schweick. - South Africa
- Helictotrichon longifolium (Nees) Schweick. - South Africa, Lesotho
- Helictotrichon longum (Stapf) Schweick. - South Africa
- Helictotrichon macrostachyum (Balansa & Durieu) Henrard - Algeria
- Helictotrichon mannii (Pilg.) C.E.Hubb. - Bioko, Cameroon
- Helictotrichon milanjianum (Rendle) C.E.Hubb. - Madagascar, East Africa
- Helictotrichon mongolicum (Roshev.) Henrard - Siberia, Mongolia, Xinjiang, Kazakhstan
- Helictotrichon mortonianum (Scribn.) Henrard - USA (Colorado, Wyoming, Utah, New Mexico)
- Helictotrichon murcicum Holub - Spain
- Helictotrichon namaquense Schweick. - South Africa
- Helictotrichon natalense (Stapf) Schweick. - South Africa
- Helictotrichon newtonii (Stapf) C.E.Hubb. - Angola
- Helictotrichon parlatorei (J.Woods) Pilg. - Alps of France, Italy, Switzerland, Austria, Slovenia
- Helictotrichon petzense H.Melzer - Alps of Austria, Slovenia
- Helictotrichon planifolium (Willk.) Holub - Pyrenees in France + Spain
- Helictotrichon polyneurum (Hook.f.) Henrard - Tamil Nadu
- Helictotrichon potaninii Tzvelev - Sichuan
- Helictotrichon quinquesetum (Steud.) Schweick. - South Africa
- Helictotrichon requienii (Mutel) Henrard - France + Spain
- Helictotrichon rogerellisii Mashau, Fish & A.E.van Wyk - South Africa
- Helictotrichon roggeveldense Mashau, Fish & A.E.van Wyk - South Africa
- Helictotrichon sangilense Krasnob. - Tuva in Siberia
- Helictotrichon sarracenorum (Gand.) Holub - Spain
- Helictotrichon schmidii (Hook.f.) Henrard - India, China
- Helictotrichon sedenense (Clarion ex DC.) Holub - France, Spain, Italy, Morocco
- Helictotrichon sempervirens (Vill.) Pilg. - Blue oat grass - France, Italy
- Helictotrichon setaceum (Vill.) Henrard - France, Italy
- Helictotrichon sumatrense Ohwi - Sumatra
- Helictotrichon tianschanicum (Roshev.) Henrard - Kyrgyzstan, Tajikistan, Kazakhstan, Xinjiang
- Helictotrichon tibeticum (Roshev.) Holub - China incl Tibet + Xinjiang
- Helictotrichon turcomanicum Czopanov - Turkmenistan
- Helictotrichon umbrosum (Hochst. ex Steud.) C.E.Hubb. - Ethiopia, Sudan, South Sudan, Kenya, Uganda, Tanzania
- Helictotrichon uniyalii Kandwal & B.K.Gupta - Uttarakhand
- Helictotrichon yunnanense S.Wang & B.S.Sun - Yunnan

formerly included

Many species once considered part of Helictotrichon are now regarded as better suited to other genera. A large number are now in Helictochloa with smaller numbers of species in Amphibromus, Arrhenatherum, Avenula, Danthoniastrum, Duthiea, Tricholemma, and Trisetum.
