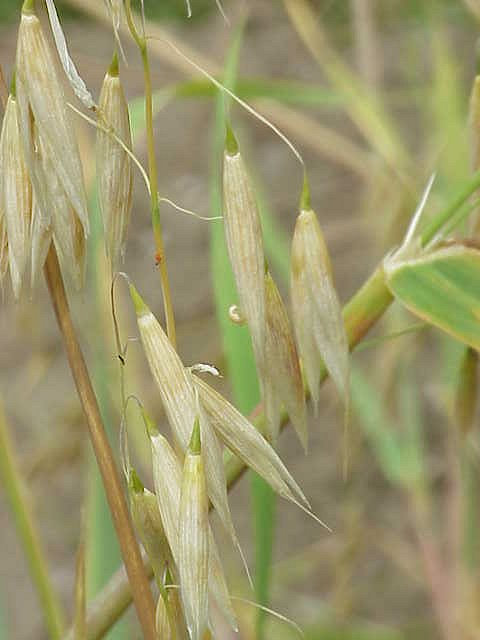

Scientific classification
- Kingdom: Plantae
- Clade: Embryophytes
- Clade: Tracheophytes
- Clade: Spermatophytes
- Clade: Angiosperms
- Clade: Monocots
- Clade: Commelinids
- Order: Poales
- Family: Poaceae
- Subfamily: Pooideae
- Genus: Avena
- Species: A. nuda

Binomial name
- Avena nuda L.

Synonyms
- Avena albicans F.Lestib.; Avena nudibrevis Vavilov [Invalid]; Avena sativa subsp. nuda (L.) Gillet & Magne; Avena sativa var. biaristata Alef.; Avena sativa var. nuda (L.) Körn.; Avena strigosa var. nuda (L.) Hausskn.

= Avena nuda =

Species of grass

Avena nuda (hulless oat, naked oat) is a species of grass with edible seeds in the oat genus Avena.

When threshed, the hull separates quite readily from the grain.

Naked oats are thought to have originated in China where they have been grown for centuries and used for both feed and food, and then migrated from China to Europe, where naked oats were grown in Britain as early as the middle of the sixteenth century.

Rather than being a variant of common oat, analysis of sequenced genomic data of 100 oat plants from around the world provides evidence that hulled oat (Avena sativa) and naked oat diverged around 51,000 years ago and were likely domesticated independently in Europe and China.

== Pillas ==
A type of naked oat called pillas, pilez, or pil-corn in the Cornish language and dialect of English may have been the same species as Avena nuda. John Ray calls it Avena minuta. Well known in the 17th century it was commonly grown in Cornwall as late as the 18th and 19th centuries. The last known crop was harvested at Sancreed in 1867.

In form pillas is described as being similar to rye, but with much finer straw. The straw, being much softer and tougher than wheat straw, was used for plaiting hats.

The small yellow grain was seldom ground into flour but was made into a type of porridge known as gurts. Pillas gurts were prepared by damping the grain and leaving it to stand in a warm place until it started to cheeny (sprout). It was then put in a baker (iron pan) and stirred over a slow fire until completely dry and a little scroached (scorched). The grain was then left to cool while spread out on a cloth before being crushed a handful at a time in a small granite trough with a large round bowel (pebble). As well as being made into porridge with milk the gurts were often used in place of flour or rice in puddings. A small amount was also added by the old housewives to the malt when extra strong ale was required. It was for that latter use that old women were threatened with fines by the excisemen if they continued to put their grain to cheeny.
