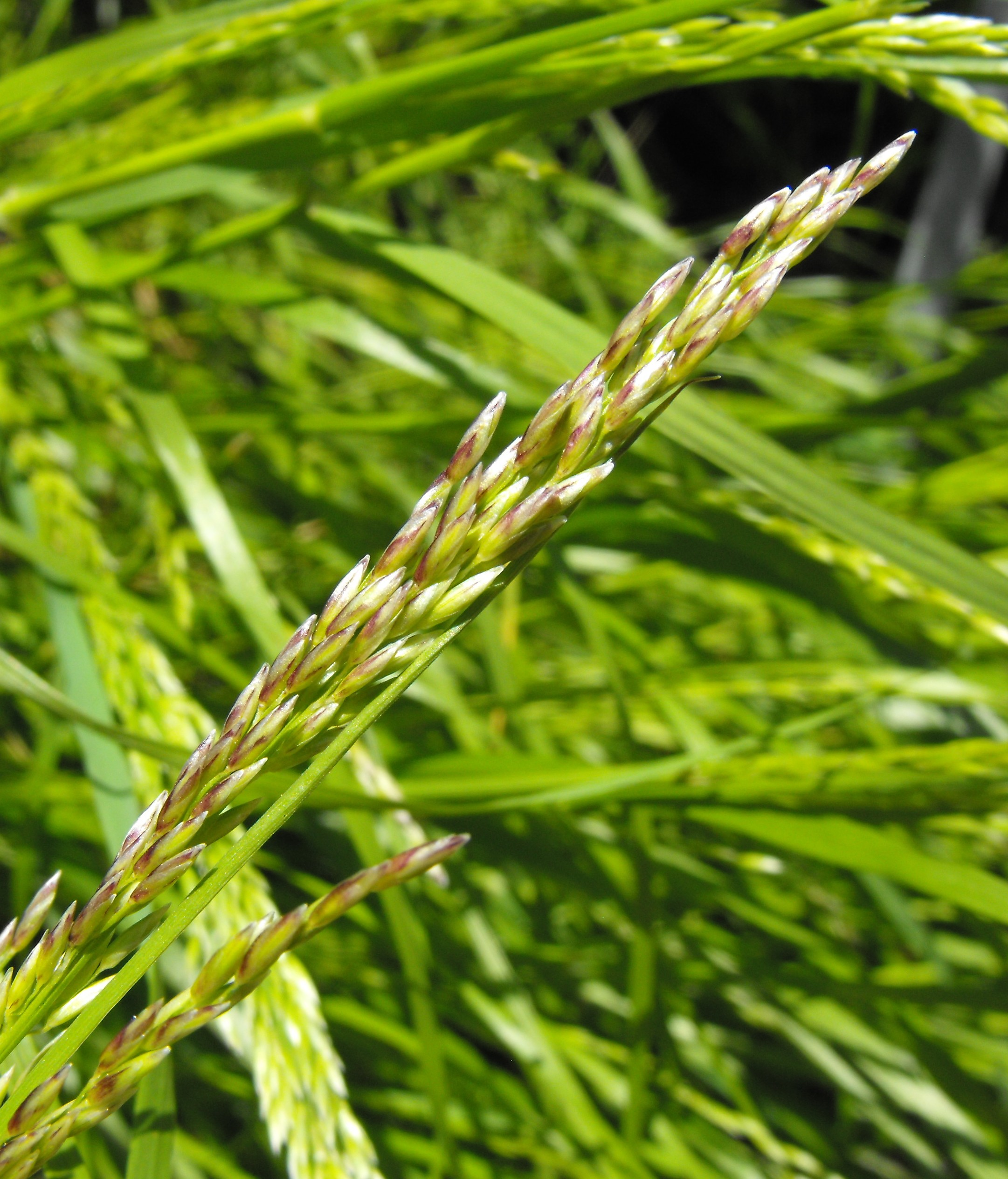

Scientific classification
- Kingdom: Plantae
- Clade: Tracheophytes
- Clade: Angiosperms
- Clade: Monocots
- Clade: Commelinids
- Order: Poales
- Family: Poaceae
- Subfamily: Pooideae
- Genus: Melica
- Species: M. imperfecta

Binomial name
- Melica imperfecta Trin.

= Melica imperfecta =

Species of flowering plant

Melica imperfecta is a species of grass known by the common name smallflower melic and little California melic.

It is native to the Arizona, California, and Nevada in the United States and Baja California in Mexico. It grows in chaparral, woodlands, montane regions, and other dry areas.

== Description ==
Melica imperfecta is a perennial grass growing up to 1.2 metres (3.9 ft) in maximum height, and is classified as a bunchgrass by lacking rhizomes and corms. The inflorescence is a narrow or spreading series of spikelets which are green in color with areas of purple.

== Cultivation ==
Melica imperfecta is cultivated in the specialty horticulture trade and available as an ornamental grass for: natural landscape, native plant, drought tolerant water conserving, and habitat gardens.
