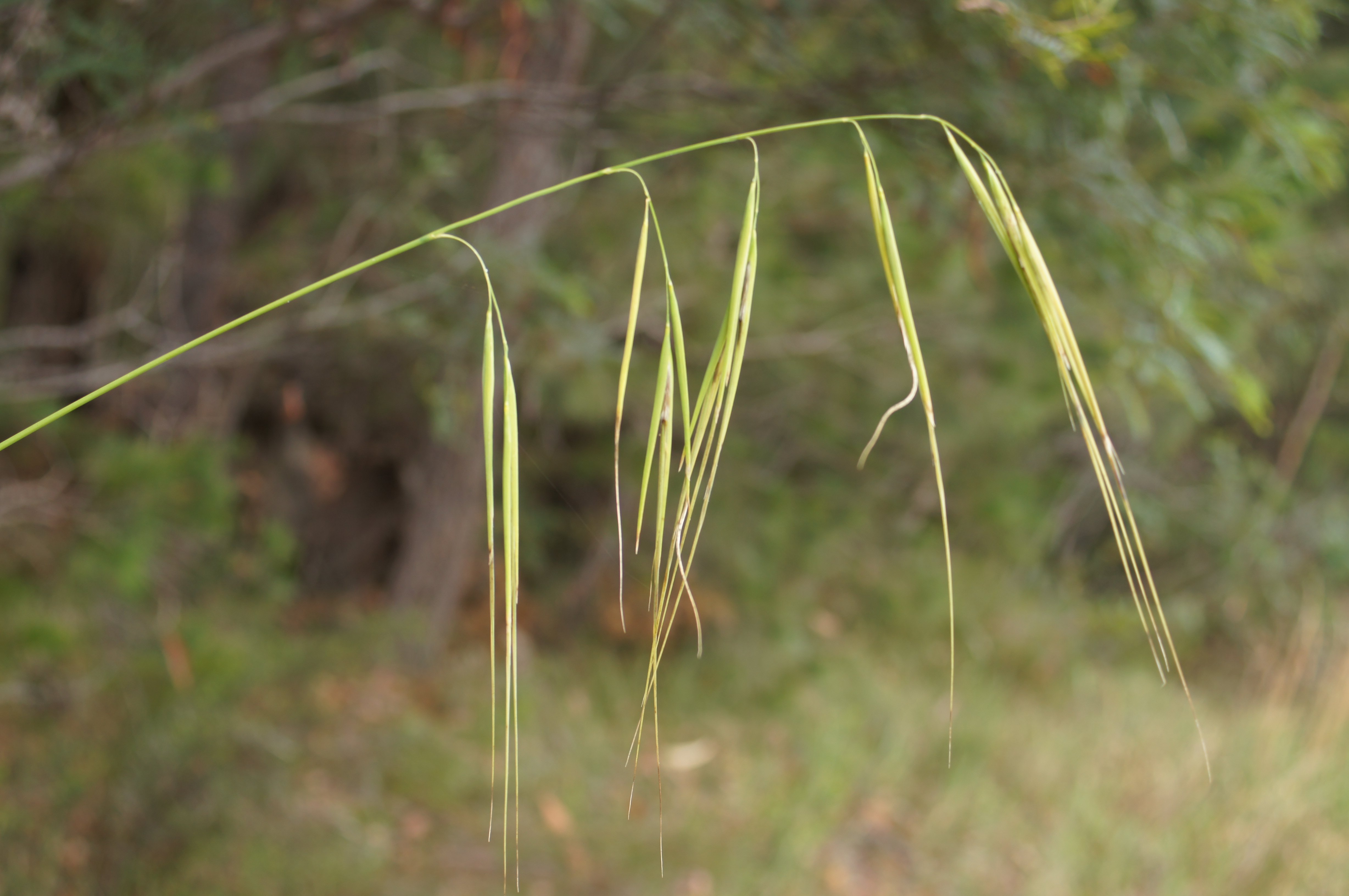
- Anisopogon avenaceus

Scientific classification
- Kingdom: Plantae
- Clade: Tracheophytes
- Clade: Angiosperms
- Clade: Monocots
- Clade: Commelinids
- Order: Poales
- Family: Poaceae
- Clade: BOP clade
- Subfamily: Pooideae
- Tribe: Duthieeae; Röser & Jul.Schneider (2011)

Genera
- Anisopogon; Danthoniastrum; Duthiea (syn. Triavenopsis); Metcalfia; Pappagrostis; Pseudodanthonia; Sinochasea; Stephanachne

Synonyms
- subtribe Duthieinae Pilg. ex Potztal (1969)

= Duthieeae =

Tribe of grasses

Duthieeae is a tribe of grasses, subfamily Pooideae, containing eight genera.
