= Avena abyssinica =

Conservation status
- Least Concern (IUCN 3.1)

Scientific classification
- Kingdom: Plantae
- Clade: Tracheophytes
- Clade: Angiosperms
- Clade: Monocots
- Clade: Commelinids
- Order: Poales
- Family: Poaceae
- Subfamily: Pooideae
- Genus: Avena
- Species: A. abyssinica

Binomial name
- Avena abyssinica Hochst.

Synonyms
- Avena alba subsp. abyssinica (Hochst.) Á.Löve & D.Löve; Avena barbata var. abbreviata Hausskn.; Avena barbata var. pseudoabyssinica Tab.Morais; Avena sativa var. abyssinica (Hochst.) Körn.; Avena strigosa subsp. abyssinica (Hochst.) Thell.; Avena strigosa var. abyssinica (Hochst.) Hausskn.; Avena strigosa var. pseudoabyssinica Thell.; Avena vaviloviana var. pseudoabyssinica C.E.Hubb.; Avena wiestii var. pseudoabyssinica Thell.; Avena abyssinica var. baldratiana Cufod.; Avena abyssinica var. chiovendae Mordv.; Avena abyssinica f. glaberrima Chiov.; Avena abyssinica var. neoschimperi Cufod.; Avena sativa var. braunii Körn.; Avena sativa var. hildebrandtii Körn.; Avena sativa var. schimperi Körn.; Avena strigosa var. glaberrima (Chiov.) Thell.; Avena strigosa var. subglaberrima Malzev

Species of grass

Avena abyssinica, also known as the Ethiopian oat and "Ajja" by Ethiopians, is a member of the family Poaceae. This grain has long been used in Ethiopia and is well adapted to the high elevations and other conditions there. Still a traditional food plant in Africa, this little-known grain has potential to improve nutrition, boost food security, foster rural development and support sustainable landcare.
