= Metcalfia =

Scientific classification
- Kingdom: Plantae
- Clade: Tracheophytes
- Clade: Angiosperms
- Clade: Monocots
- Clade: Commelinids
- Order: Poales
- Family: Poaceae
- Subfamily: Pooideae
- Tribe: Duthieeae
- Genus: Metcalfia; Conert
- Species: M. mexicana

Binomial name
- Metcalfia mexicana (Scribn.) Conert

Genus of grasses

Metcalfia is a genus of plants in the grass family. It contains a single species, Metcalfia mexicana, native to Mexico.
