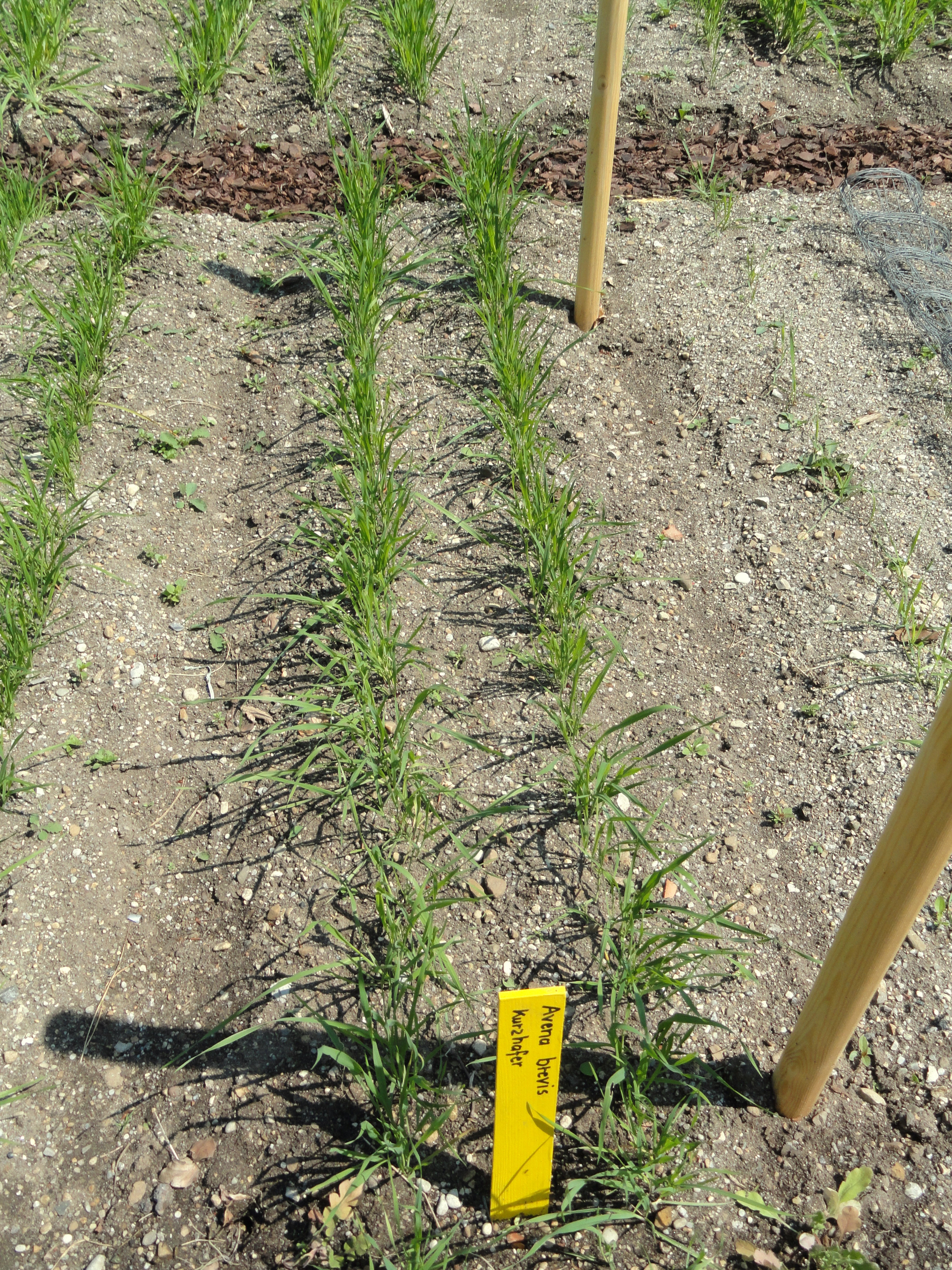

Conservation status
- Data Deficient (IUCN 3.1) (Europe regional assessment)

Scientific classification
- Kingdom: Plantae
- Clade: Embryophytes
- Clade: Tracheophytes
- Clade: Angiosperms
- Clade: Monocots
- Clade: Commelinids
- Order: Poales
- Family: Poaceae
- Subfamily: Pooideae
- Genus: Avena
- Species: A. brevis

Binomial name
- Avena brevis Roth

= Avena brevis =

Short oat

Species of grass

Avena brevis, the short oat, is a species of grass in the family Poaceae whose seeds are edible.

== Synonyms ==
There are a number of synonyms:

- Avena uniflora Parl.
- Avena sativa var. brevis (Roth) Körn.
- Avena strigosa var. abbreviata Hausskn.
- Avena strigosa var. brevis (Roth) Hausskn.
- Avena strigosa subsp. brevis (Roth) Husnot
- Avena sativa subsp. brevis (Roth) Asch. & Graebn., Syn. mitteleur.
- Avena strigosa subsp. strigosa prol. brevis (Roth) Thell.
- Avena sativa subsp. sativa var. brevis (Roth) Fiori
- Avena nuda subsp. brevis (Roth) Mansf.
