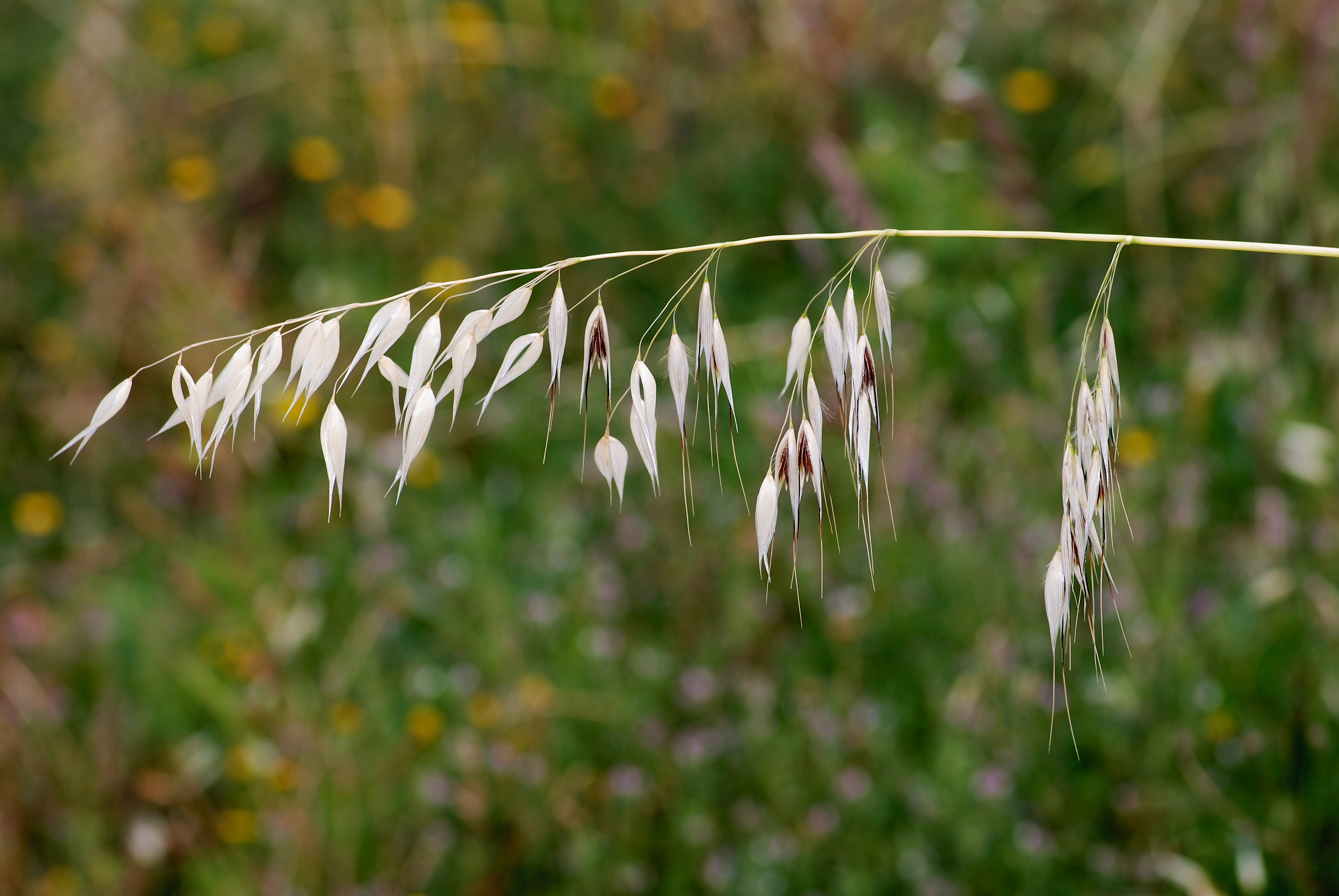

Conservation status
- Least Concern (IUCN 3.1)

Scientific classification
- Kingdom: Plantae
- Clade: Tracheophytes
- Clade: Angiosperms
- Clade: Monocots
- Clade: Commelinids
- Order: Poales
- Family: Poaceae
- Subfamily: Pooideae
- Genus: Avena
- Species: A. fatua

Binomial name
- Avena fatua L.

Synonyms
- Synonymy: Anelytrum avenaceum Hack.; Avena cultiformis (Malzev) Malzev; Avena hybrida Peterm.; Avena intermedia T.Lestib.; Avena japonica Steud.; Avena lanuginosa Gilib.; Avena meridionalis (Malzev) Roshev.; Avena nigra Wallr.; Avena occidentalis Durieu; Avena septentrionalis Malzev; Avena vilis Wallr.

= Avena fatua =

Common wild oat

Species of grass

Avena fatua is a species of grass in the oat genus. It is known as the common wild oat. Like fellow wild oat species A. sterilis, it bears 42 chromosomes, and its seeds shatter at maturity for yearly seeding. This oat is native to Eurasia (particularly the eastern Mediterranean) but it has been introduced to most of the other temperate regions of the world. It is naturalized in some areas and considered a noxious weed in others.

A. fatua is a typical oat in appearance, a green grass with hollow, erect stems 1 to 4 feet (0.30 to 1.22 m) tall bearing nodding structures – panicles – of spikelets. The long dark green leaves are up to 1 centimetre (0.39 in) wide and rough due to small hairs. The seedlings are also hairy. The seed kernel is thinner, longer, darker and hairy when compared with the seed of the common cultivated oat (A. sativa). This species and other wild oats can become troublesome in prairie agriculture when it invades and lowers the quality of a field crop, or competes for resources with the crop plants. It takes very few wild oat plants to cause a significant reduction in the yield of a wheat or cultivated oat field.
