= Avena byzantina =

Scientific classification
- Kingdom: Plantae
- Clade: Tracheophytes
- Clade: Angiosperms
- Clade: Monocots
- Clade: Commelinids
- Order: Poales
- Family: Poaceae
- Subfamily: Pooideae
- Genus: Avena
- Species: A. byzantina

Binomial name
- Avena byzantina K.Koch

Synonyms
- Avena sativa subsp. byzantina (K.Koch) Romero Zarco; Avena sterilis subsp. byzantina (K.Koch) Thell.; Avena byzantina subvar. biaristata (Hack. ex Trab.) Maire & Weiller; Avena byzantina var. biaristata (Hack. ex Trab.) Thell.; Avena byzantina var. hypomelanthera (Thell.) Parodi; Avena sativa var. biaristata Hack. ex Trab.; Avena sterilis subvar. biaristata (Hack. ex Trab.) Malzev; Avena sterilis var. biaristata (Hack. ex Trab.) Thell.; Avena sterilis subvar. hypomelanthera (Thell.) Malzev; Avena sterilis f. hypomelanthera Thell.; Avena sterilis var. hypomelanthera (Thell.) Parodi

Species of plant in the genus Avena

Avena byzantina, red oats, is a species of cultivated oat in the family Poaceae. It is native to Greece, Turkey, Cyprus, the Transcaucasus, Iran, and Saudi Arabia. Cultivated for thousands of years, it is better suited to warmer conditions than white or common oats (Avena sativa), but is often sown as a no‑till winter crop. There are 564 landraces and 203 cultivars of red oats listed in the European Plant Genetic Resources Search Catalogue (EURISCO). Approximately 10% of the millions of hectares worldwide under oats are devoted to red oats, principally for fodder.
