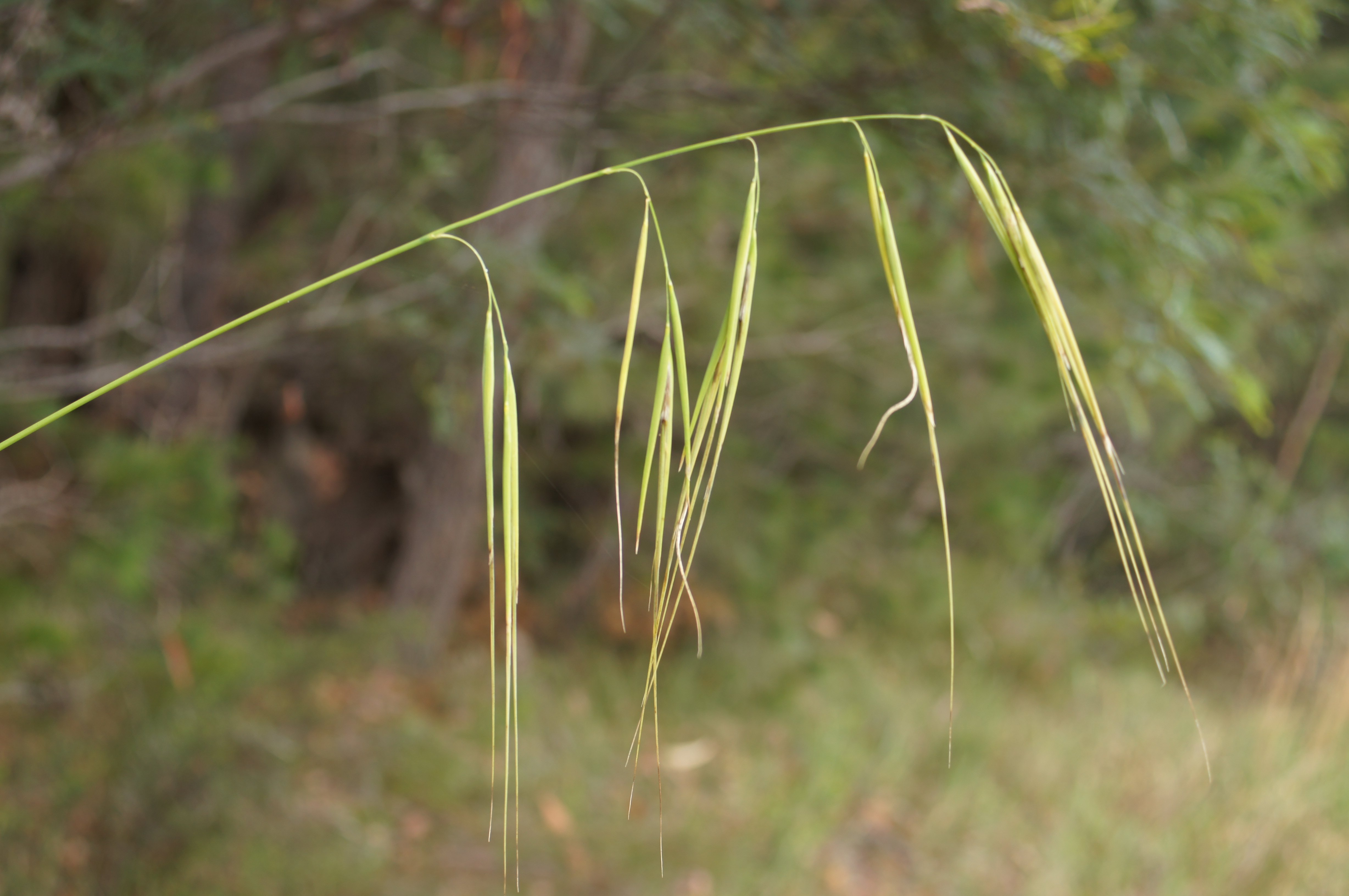

Scientific classification
- Kingdom: Plantae
- Clade: Tracheophytes
- Clade: Angiosperms
- Clade: Monocots
- Clade: Commelinids
- Order: Poales
- Family: Poaceae
- Subfamily: Pooideae
- Tribe: Duthieeae
- Genus: Anisopogon; R.Br.
- Species: A. avenaceus

Binomial name
- Anisopogon avenaceus R.Br.

Synonyms
- Deyeuxia avenacea (R.Br.) Spreng.; Avena anisopogon Raspail; Danthonia anisopogon Trin.

= Anisopogon =

Genus of grasses

Anisopogon is a genus of Australian plants in the grass family. The only known species is Anisopogon avenaceus, native to Victoria and New South Wales. It is known commonly as oat speargrass. It is a perennial grass growing up to 1.5 metres tall, bearing spikelets up to 6 centimetres long.

== See also ==
- List of Poaceae genera
