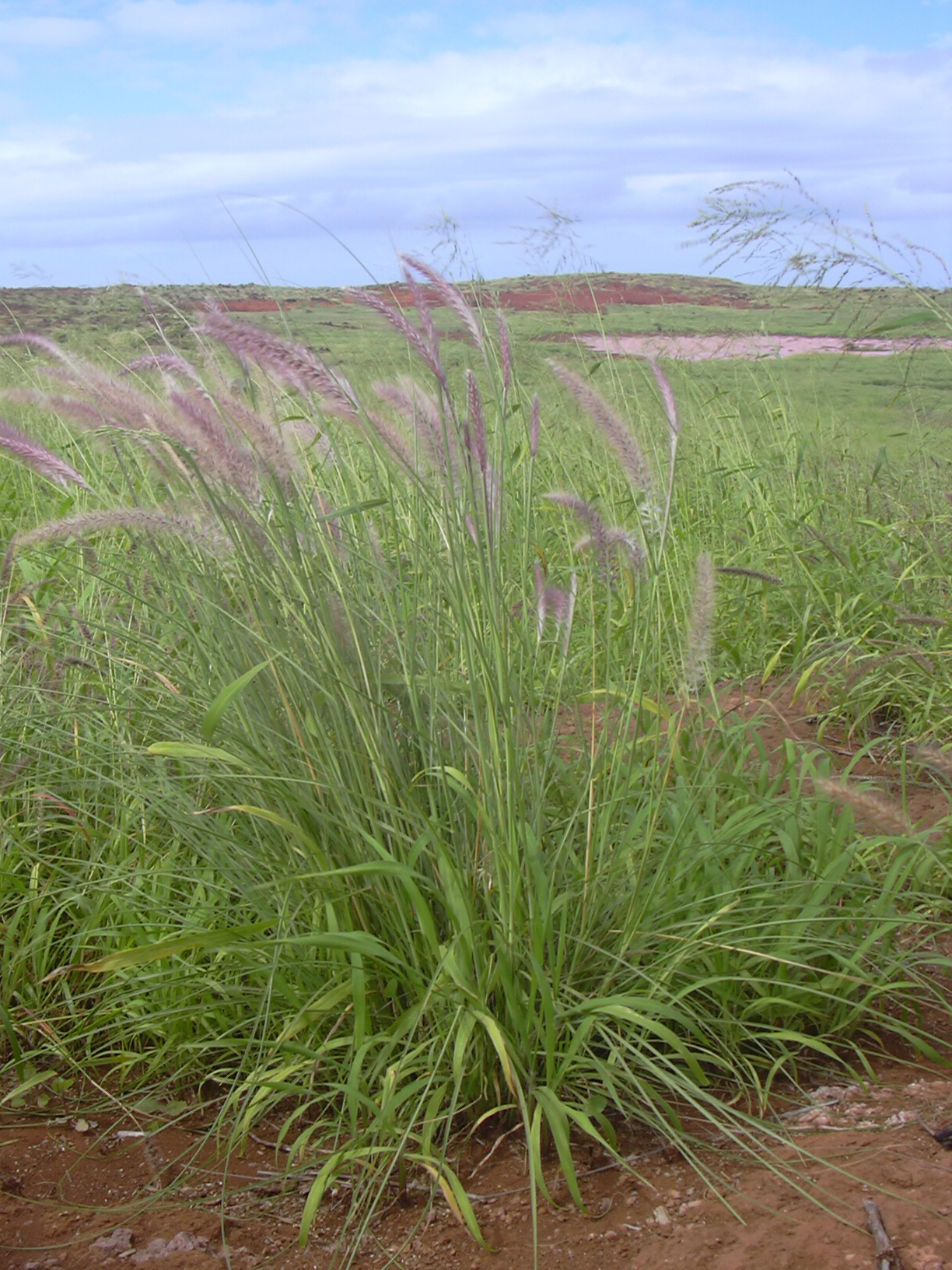

Scientific classification
- Kingdom: Plantae
- Clade: Tracheophytes
- Clade: Angiosperms
- Clade: Monocots
- Clade: Commelinids
- Order: Poales
- Family: Poaceae
- Subfamily: Panicoideae
- Genus: Cenchrus
- Species: C. setaceus

Binomial name
- Cenchrus setaceus (Forssk.) Morrone

Synonyms
- List: Pennisetum erythraeum Chiov.; Pennisetum numidicum Paris; Pennisetum parisii (Trab.) Trab.; Pennisetum phalaroides Schult.; Pennisetum ruppellii Steud.; Pennisetum scoparium Chiov.; Pennisetum setaceum (Forssk.) Chiov.; Pennisetum spectabile Fig. & De Not.; Pennisetum tiberiadis Boiss.; Phalaris setacea Forssk.

= Cenchrus setaceus =

Species of grass

Cenchrus setaceus, commonly known as crimson fountaingrass, is a C_{4} perennial bunch grass that is native to open, scrubby habitats in East Africa, tropical Africa, the Middle East and south-western Asia. It has been introduced to many parts of the world as an ornamental plant, and has become an invasive species in some of them. It is drought-tolerant, grows fast, reaches 3 feet in height, and has many purple, plumose flower spikes.

== Environmental threat ==
Fountaingrass has been introduced to the Canary Islands, Sicily, Sardinia, southern Spain, Australia, South Africa, Hawaii, the western United States, southern Florida and New Caledonia. It thrives in warmer, drier areas and threatens many native species, with which it competes very effectively as an invasive species. It also tends to increase the risk of intense wildfires, to which it is well adapted, thus posing a further threat to certain native species.

In Europe, Fountain grass is included since 2017 in the list of Invasive Alien Species of Union concern (the Union list). This implies that this species cannot be imported, cultivated, transported, commercialized, planted, or intentionally released into the environment in the whole of the European Union.

== Gallery ==
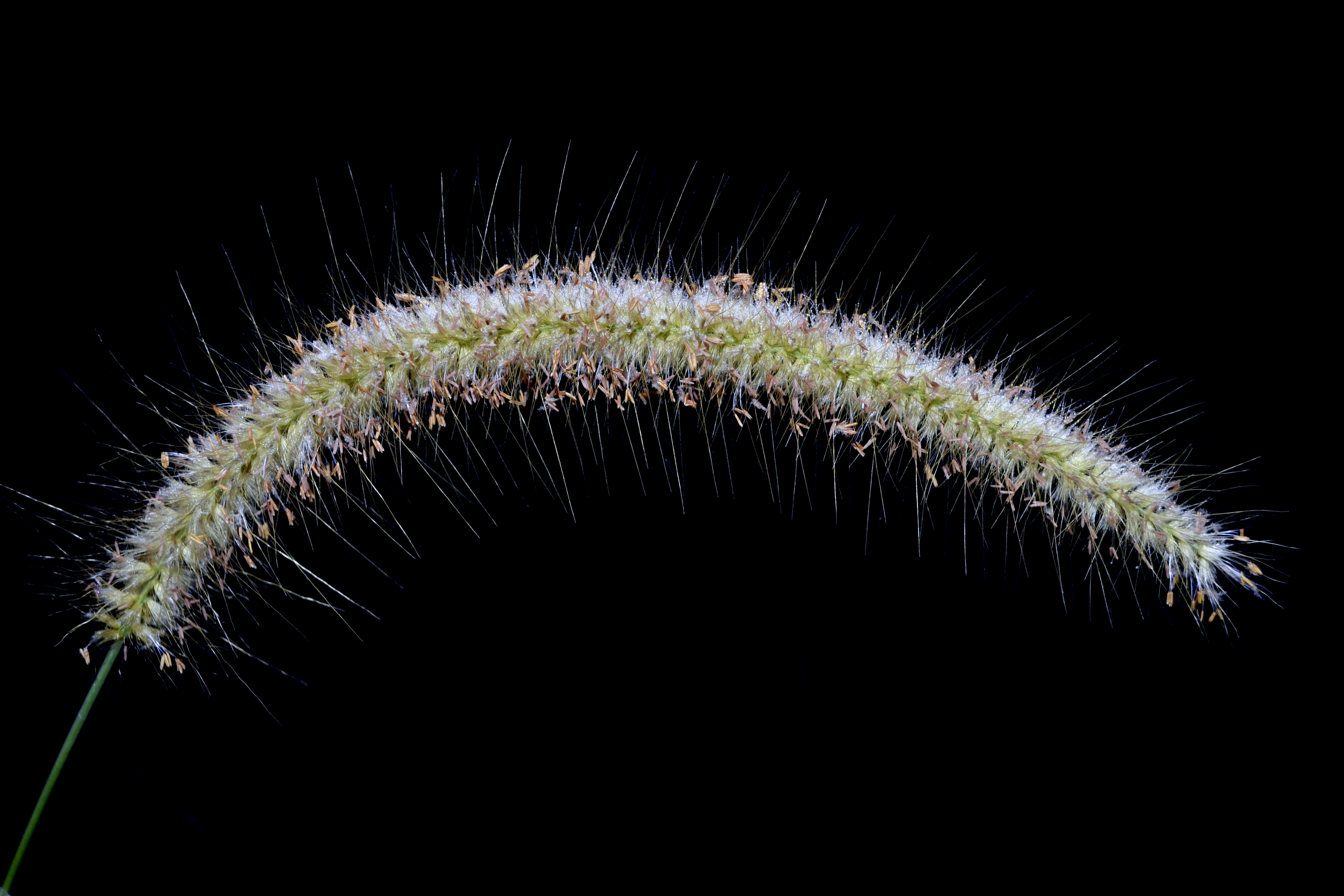
Ripening seeds of Cenchrus setaceus, In Kannur – Kerala

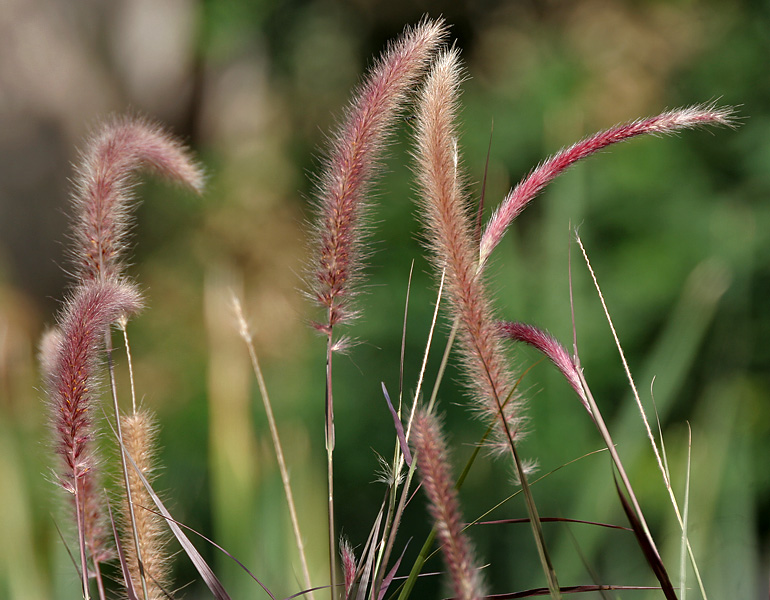
in Hyderabad, India

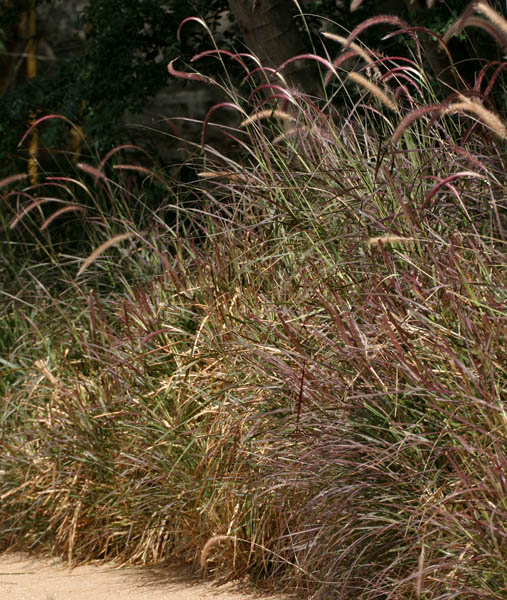
in Hyderabad, India

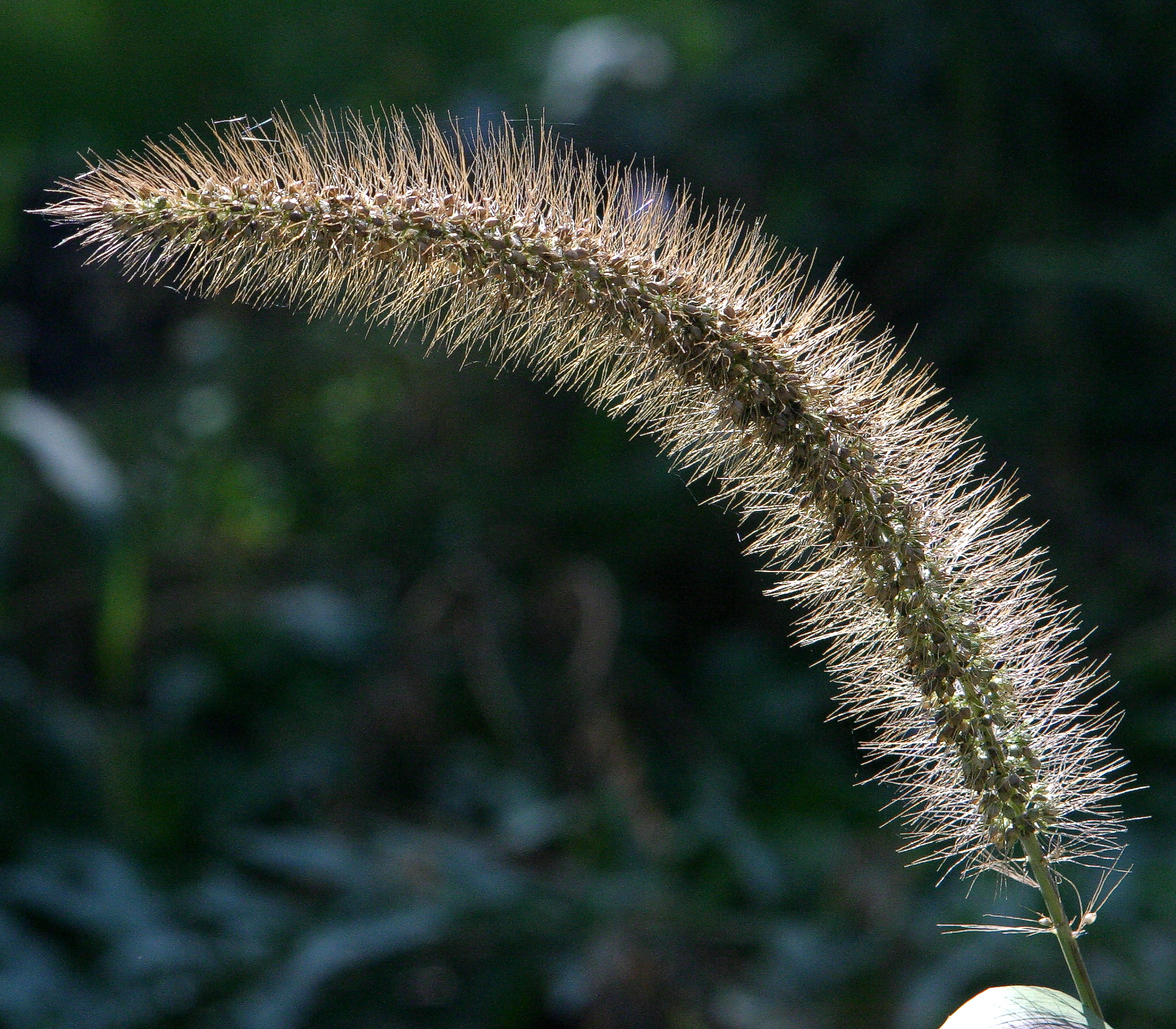
Detail of ripening seeds

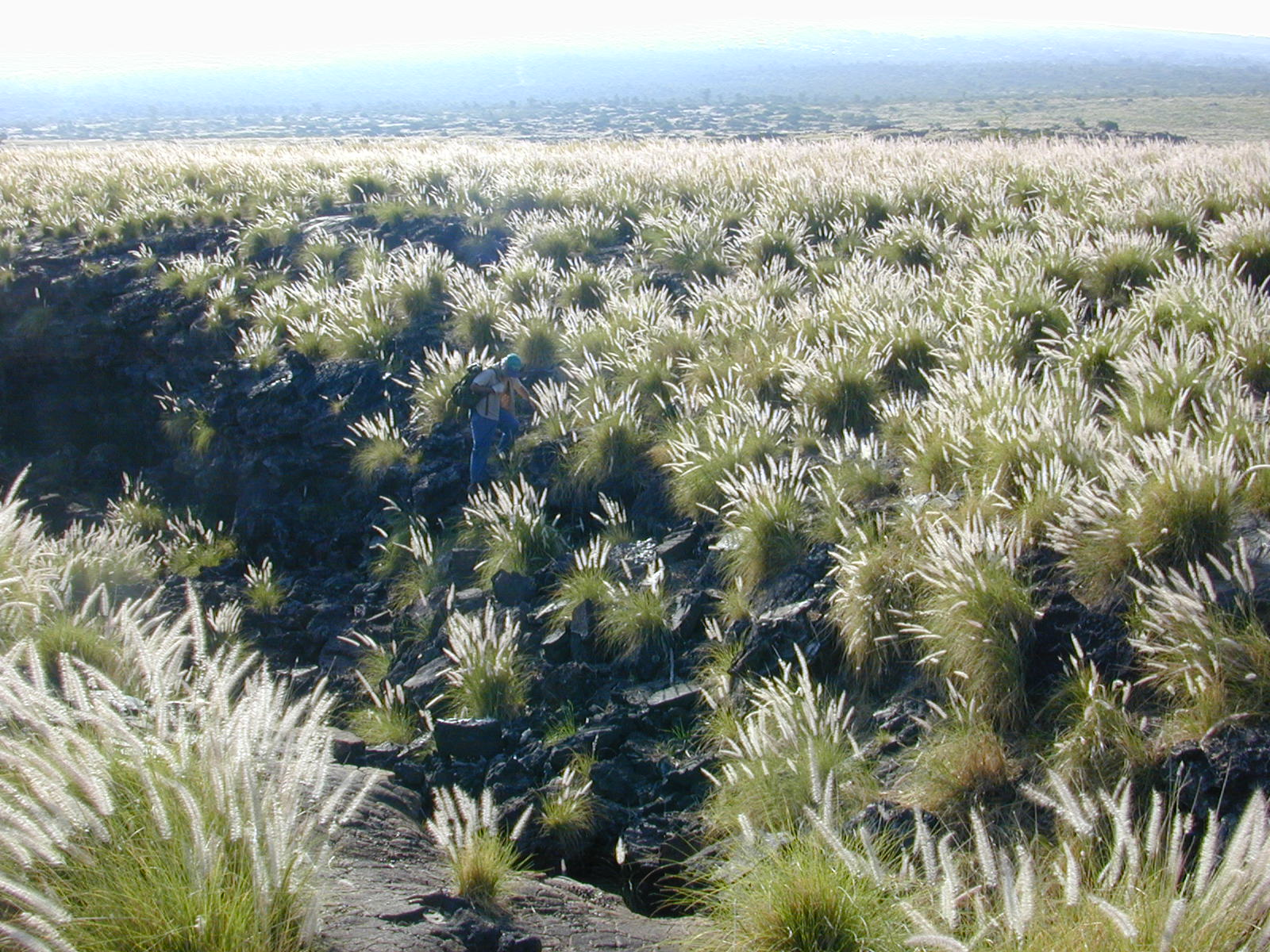
Invasive, on a lava flow near Kailua-Kona, Hawaii

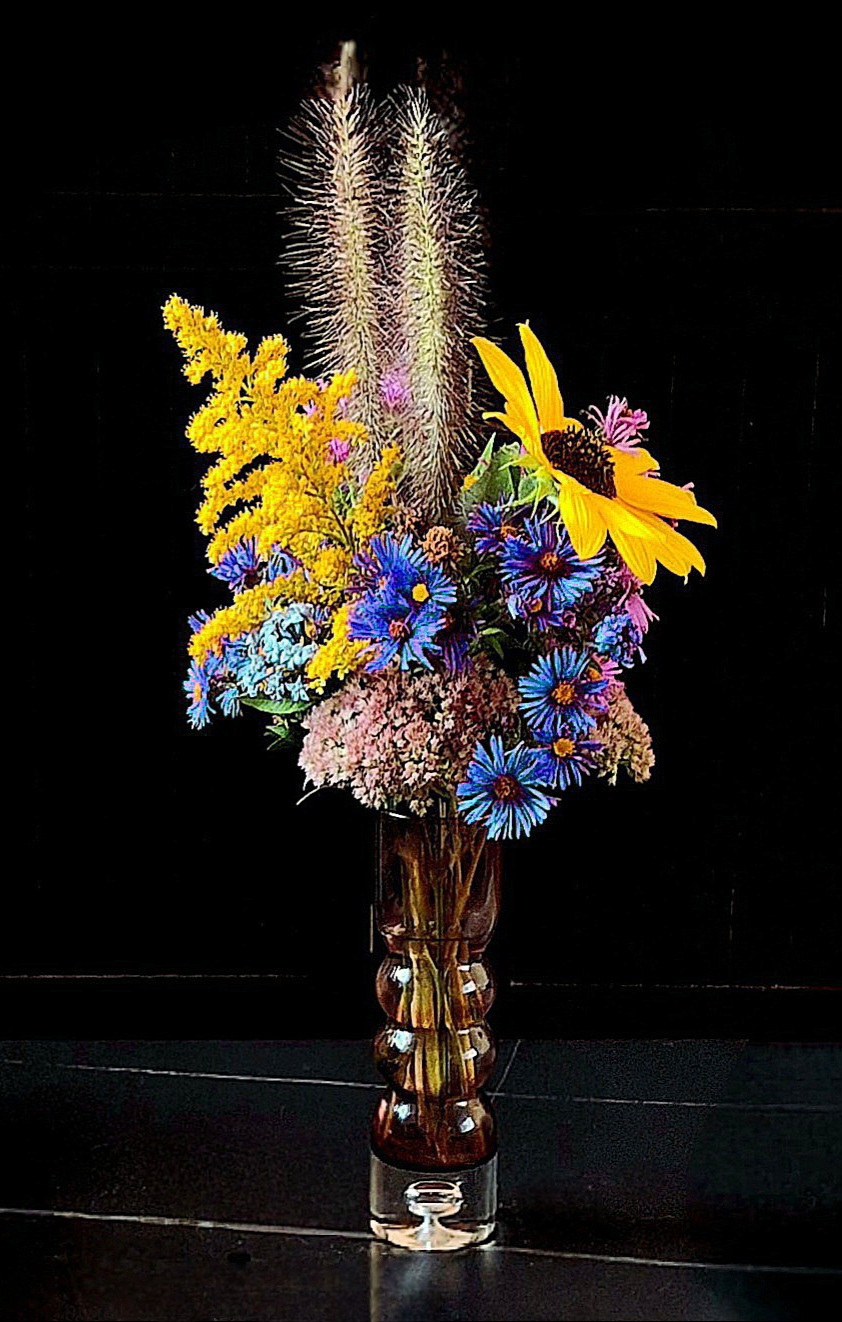
Autumn bouquet featuring showy plumes of Cenchrus setaceus (southeastern New York)
