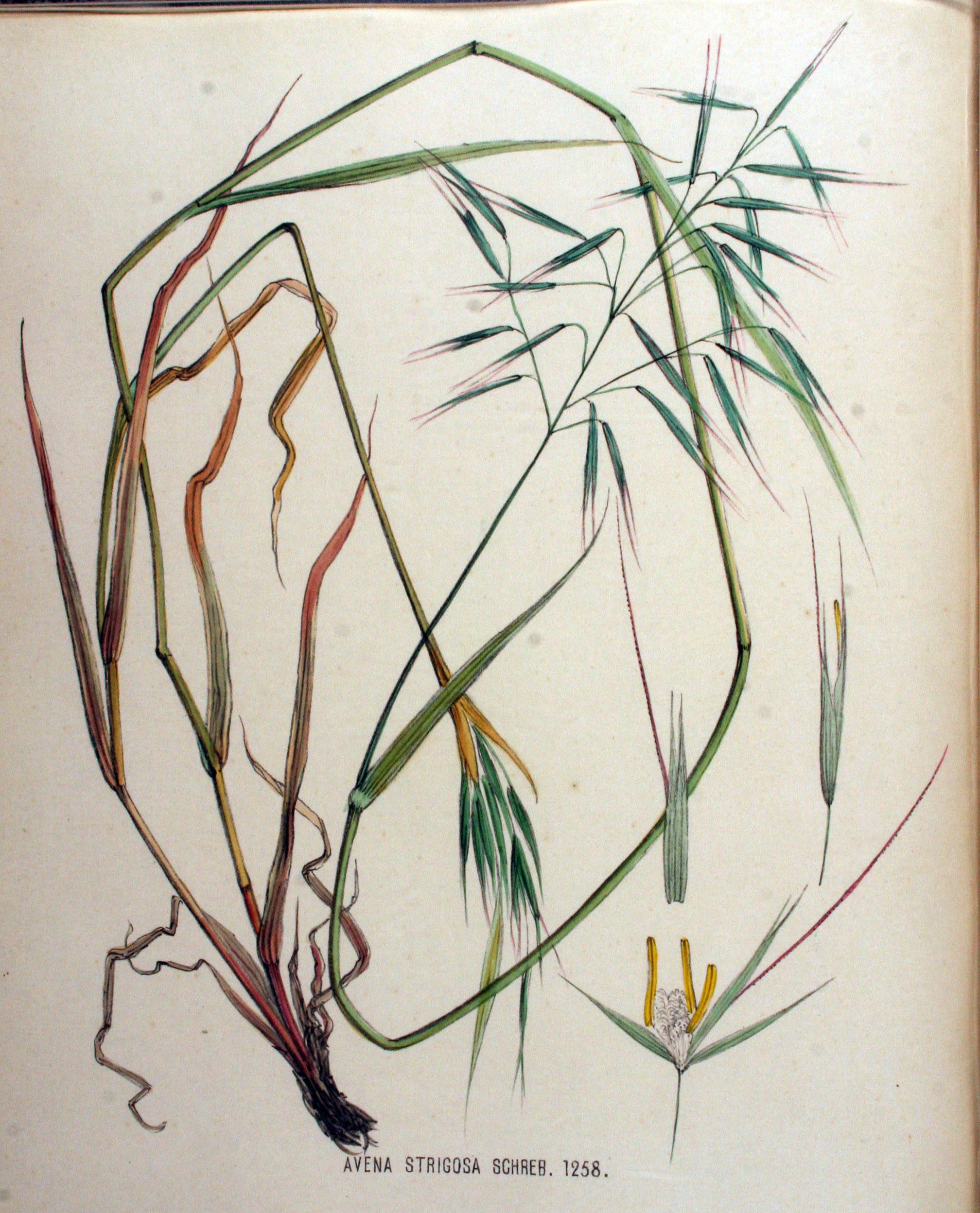

Conservation status
- Data Deficient (IUCN 3.1)

Scientific classification
- Kingdom: Plantae
- Clade: Tracheophytes
- Clade: Angiosperms
- Clade: Monocots
- Clade: Commelinids
- Order: Poales
- Family: Poaceae
- Subfamily: Pooideae
- Genus: Avena
- Species: A. strigosa

Binomial name
- Avena strigosa Schreb.

= Avena strigosa =

Lopsided oat

Species of grass

Avena strigosa (also called lopsided oat, bristle oat or black oat; syn. Avena hispanica Ard.) is a species of grass native to Europe. It has edible seeds and is often cultivated as animal feed in Portugal and Brazil. It is the only 14-chromosome species of the seven in existence that is grown for profit (though on small land areas). It is sometimes reported as a weed.

== Description ==
Avena strigosa is a tufted grass growing to a height of 0.8–1.6 m. Its seeds are smaller than those of the common oat, Avena sativa.

== Uses ==
Avena strigosa used to be cultivated as human food in Scotland, but it is now cultivated as a forage for ruminants in South America. It is a nutritive grass with a good protein content.
