= Pappagrostis =

Scientific classification
- Kingdom: Plantae
- Clade: Tracheophytes
- Clade: Angiosperms
- Clade: Monocots
- Clade: Commelinids
- Order: Poales
- Family: Poaceae
- Subfamily: Pooideae
- Tribe: Duthieeae
- Genus: Pappagrostis; Roshev. (1934)
- Species: P. pappophorea

Binomial name
- Pappagrostis pappophorea (Hack.) Roshev. (1934)

Synonyms
- Calamagrostis pappophorea Hack. (1903) (basionym; Stephanachne monandra (P.C.Kuo & S.L.Lu) P.C.Kuo & S.L.Lu (1987); Stephanachne pappophorea (Hack.) Keng (1934); Stephanachne pappophorea var. monandra P.C.Kuo & S.L.Lu (1979)

Genus of grasses

Pappagrostis is a genus of grasses. It includes a single species, Pappagrostis pappophorea, a perennial native to Tajikistan, Xinjiang, Mongolia, and northern China.
