= Sinochasea =

Scientific classification
- Kingdom: Plantae
- Clade: Tracheophytes
- Clade: Angiosperms
- Clade: Monocots
- Clade: Commelinids
- Order: Poales
- Family: Poaceae
- Subfamily: Pooideae
- Tribe: Duthieeae
- Genus: Sinochasea; Keng
- Species: S. trigyna

Binomial name
- Sinochasea trigyna Keng

Synonyms
- Pseudodanthonia trigyna (Keng) Clayton; Trikeraia oreophila Cope; Trikeraia tianshanica S.L.Lu & X.F.Lu

Genus of grasses

Sinochasea is a genus of plants in the grass family. The only known species is Sinochasea trigyna, native to mountainous regions of Tibet, Qinghai, Nepal, Bhutan, Sikkim and Arunachal Pradesh.
