= Duthiea =

Scientific classification
- Kingdom: Plantae
- Clade: Tracheophytes
- Clade: Angiosperms
- Clade: Monocots
- Clade: Commelinids
- Order: Poales
- Family: Poaceae
- Subfamily: Pooideae
- Tribe: Duthieeae
- Genus: Duthiea; Hack. 1896 not Speta 2001 (syn of Drimia in Hyacinthaceae) nor Manza 1937 (red alga in Corallinaceae)

Type species
- Duthiea bromoides Hack.

Synonyms
- Thrixgyne Keng; Triavenopsis P.Candargy

Plant genus

Duthiea is a genus of Asian plants in the grass family.

Species

- Duthiea brachypodium (P.Candargy) Keng & Keng f. - Qinghai, Sichuan, Tibet, Yunnan, Bhutan, Nepal, Sikkim, Arunachal Pradesh
- Duthiea bromoides Hack. - Jammu & Kashmir, Federally Administered Tribal Areas of Pakistan, Afghanistan
- Duthiea oligostachya (Munro ex Aitch.) Stapf - Kurram Valley in Pakistan + Afghanistan

names in homonymic genus in Hyacinthaceae

see Drimia

- Duthiea macrocarpa - Drimia macrocarpa
- Duthiea noctiflora - Drimia noctiflora
- Duthiea senegalensis - Drimia senegalensis
