= Danthoniastrum =

Scientific classification
- Kingdom: Plantae
- Clade: Tracheophytes
- Clade: Angiosperms
- Clade: Monocots
- Clade: Commelinids
- Order: Poales
- Family: Poaceae
- Subfamily: Pooideae
- Tribe: Duthieeae
- Genus: Danthoniastrum (Holub) Holub

Type species
- Helictotrichon compactum (Boiss. & Heldr.) Henr.

Synonyms
- Helictotrichon subgen. Danthoniastrum Holub

Genus of grasses

Danthoniastrum is a genus of Balkan and Caucasian plants in the grass family.

Species

- Danthoniastrum brevidentatum H.Scholz - Kosovo, Albania
- Danthoniastrum compactum (Boiss. & Heldr.) Holub - Greece
- Danthoniastrum kolakovskyi Tzvelev - Bulgaria, Republic of Georgia
- Danthoniastrum neumayerianum (Vis.) Tzvelev - Croatia, Montenegro
