= Reedgrass =

Reedgrass may refer to:

- Alpine reedgrass (Calamagrostis purpurascens)
- Bluejoint reedgrass (Calamagrostis canadensis)
- Bolander's reedgrass (Calamagrostis bolanderi)
- Fire reedgrass (Calamagrostis koelerioides)
- Leafy reedgrass (Calamagrostis foliosa)
- Serpentine reedgrass (Calamagrostis ophitidis)
