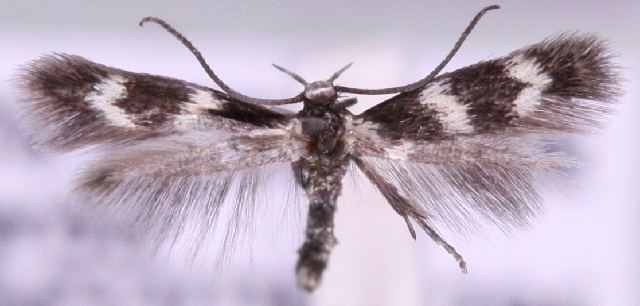

Scientific classification
- Kingdom: Animalia
- Phylum: Arthropoda
- Class: Insecta
- Order: Lepidoptera
- Family: Elachistidae
- Genus: Elachista
- Species: E. bifasciella

Binomial name
- Elachista bifasciella Treitschke, 1833

Synonyms
- Biselachista bifasciellaTraugott-Olsen & Nielsen, 1977; Cosmiotes bifasciella Clemens, 1860

= Elachista bifasciella =

Species of moth

Elachista bifasciella is a moth of the family Elachistidae. It is found from Sweden to the Pyrenees, Italy and Romania and from the Netherlands to Poland. It is the type species of the genus Elachista.

The wingspan is 7–9 millimetres (0.28–0.35 in). Adults are on wing in May and June.

The larvae feed on Agrostis gigantea, Agrostis stolonifera, Brachypodium sylvaticum, Calamagrostis arundinacea, Calamagrostis varia, Calamagrostis villosa, Corynephorus canescens, Dactylis glomerata, Deschampsia cespitosa, Deschampsia flexuosa, Festuca gigantea, Festuca ovina, Festuca rubra, Holcus mollis, Milium effusum and Poa nemoralis. They mine the leaves of their host plant.
