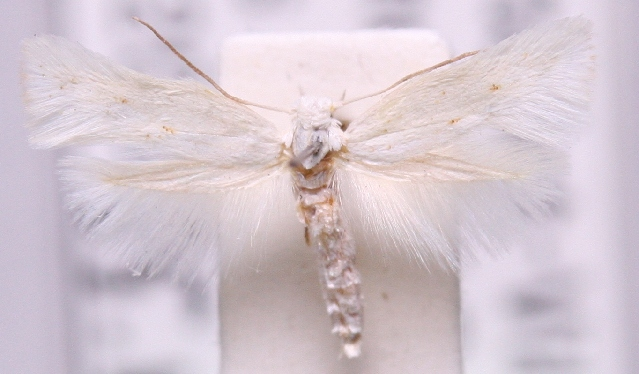

Scientific classification
- Domain: Eukaryota
- Kingdom: Animalia
- Phylum: Arthropoda
- Class: Insecta
- Order: Lepidoptera
- Family: Elachistidae
- Genus: Elachista
- Species: E. dimicatella

Binomial name
- Elachista dimicatella Rebel, 1903

= Elachista dimicatella =

Species of moth

Elachista dimicatella is a moth of the family Elachistidae. It is found in the mountains from Germany and Poland to the Pyrenees, Italy and Romania.

The wingspan is about 10 millimetres (0.39 in).

The larvae feed on Alopecurus pratensis, Anthoxanthum odoratum, Calamagrostis arundinacea, Calamagrostis villosa, Dactylis glomerata, Deschampsia cespitosa, Holcus mollis, Milium effusum, Phleum alpinum, Poa alpina, Poa chaixii, Sesleria albicans, Sesleria caerulea, Sesleria sadlerana tatrae. They mine the leaves of their host plant. Larvae can be found from the end June to early July.
