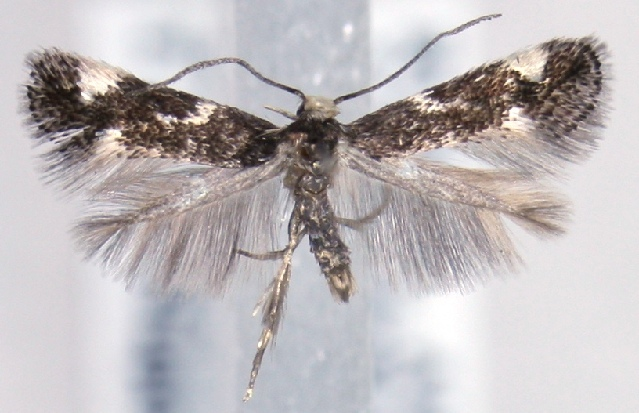

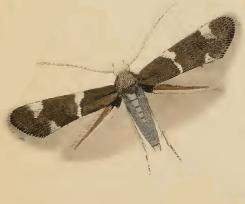

Scientific classification
- Kingdom: Animalia
- Phylum: Arthropoda
- Class: Insecta
- Order: Lepidoptera
- Family: Elachistidae
- Genus: Elachista
- Species: E. albifrontella

Binomial name
- Elachista albifrontella (Hubner, 1817)

Synonyms
- Biselachista albifrontella Traugott-Olsen & Nielsen, 1977; Cosmiotes albifrontella Clemens, 1860; Tinea albifrontella Hübner, 1817

= Elachista albifrontella =

Species of moth

Elachista albifrontella is a moth of the family Elachistidae found in Europe.

== Description ==
The wingspan is 8–9 millimetres (0.31–0.35 in). The head is white with a conspicuously whitish forehead. Forewings are blackish; a somewhat oblique fascia before middle, sometimes interrupted, a tornal spot, and a rather larger triangular costal spot beyond it white. Hindwings dark grey. The larva is yellow-whitish; head pale brown; 2 with three rows of brown dots.

They are on wing from June to July in one generation per year.

The larvae feed on velvet bent (Agrostis canina), meadow foxtail (Alopecurus pratensis), false oat-grass (Arrhenatherum elatius), oats (Avena species), Avenula pubescens, false-brome (Brachypodium sylvaticum), bromes (Bromus species), bunch grass (Calamagrostis arundinacea), Calamagrostis epigejos, Dactylis glomerata, Deschampsia cespitosa, Elymus repens, Festuca rubra, Holcus lanatus, Holcus mollis, Koeleria macrantha, Luzula pilosa, Milium effusum, Phalaris arundinacea, Phleum, Poa pratensis, rough meadow-grass (Poa trivialis), oatgrass (Trisetum species) and wheat (Triticum species). They mine the leaves of their host plant. Larvae can be found from September to May. Pupation takes place outside of the mine.

== Distribution ==
It is found from Fennoscandia and northern Russia to the Pyrenees and Italy and from Ireland to Romania.
