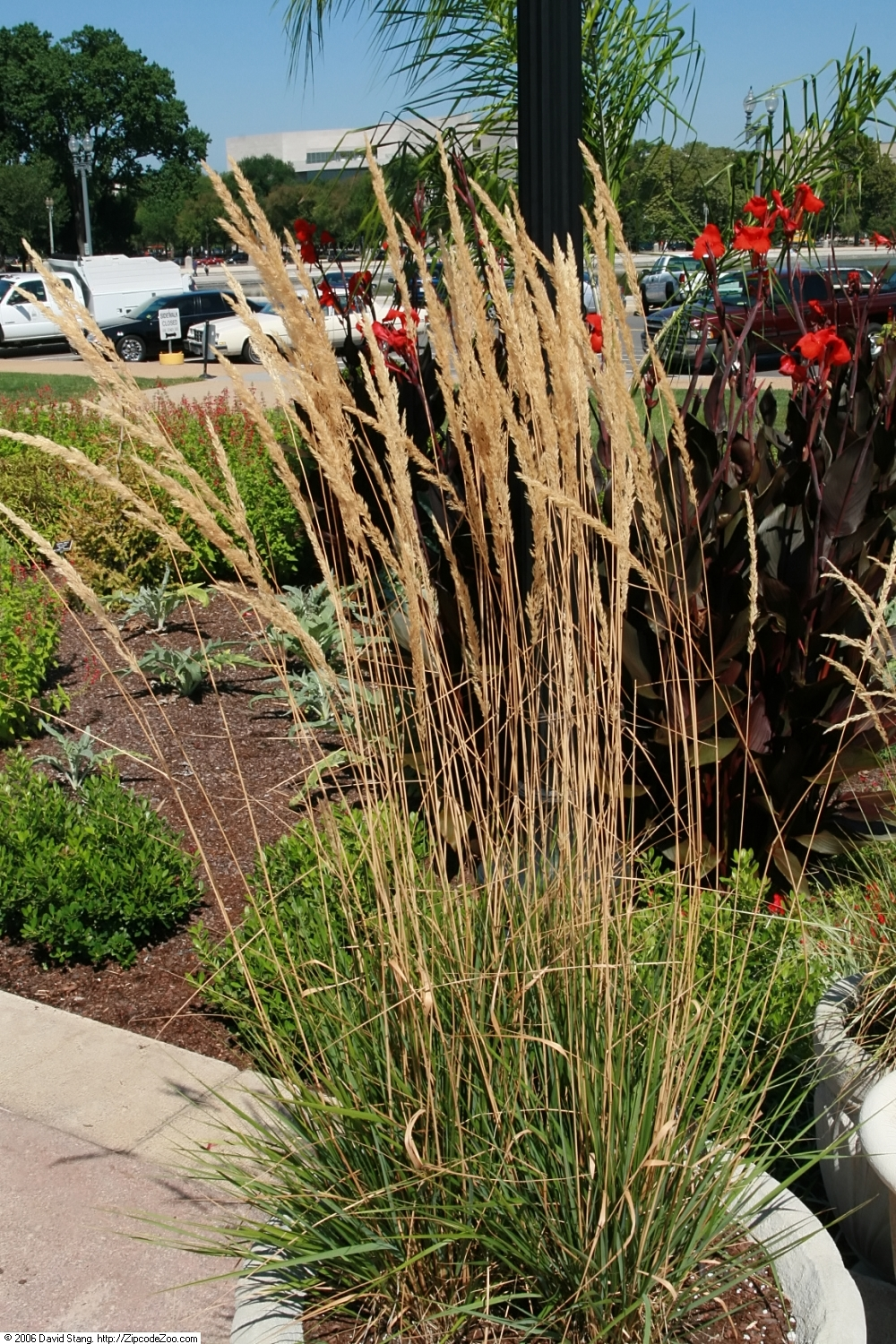
- 'Overdam' cultivar
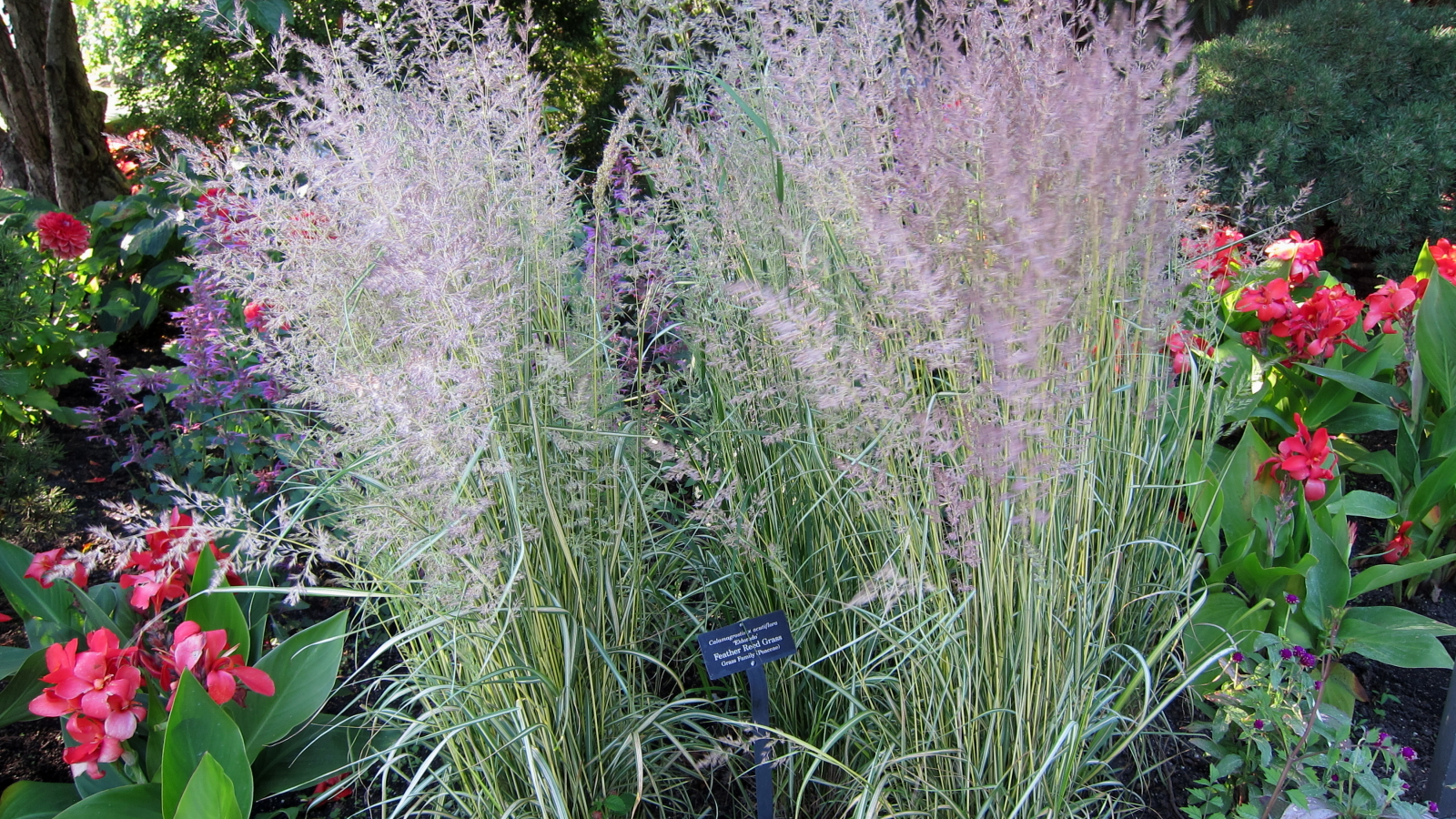
- 'Eldorado' cultivar

Scientific classification
- Kingdom: Plantae
- Clade: Tracheophytes
- Clade: Angiosperms
- Clade: Monocots
- Clade: Commelinids
- Order: Poales
- Family: Poaceae
- Subfamily: Pooideae
- Genus: Calamagrostis
- Species: C. × acutiflora

Binomial name
- Calamagrostis × acutiflora (Schrad.) DC.

Synonyms
- List: Arundo × acutiflora Schrad.; Arundo × agrostis Weber; Arundo × pseudoarundinacea Schleich. ex Gaudin; Arundo × splendida Schkuhr ex Steud.; Arundo × subulata J.Gay ex Rchb.; Calamagrostis × arundinacea Wibel; Calamagrostis × subulata Dumort.; Calamagrostis × subuliglumis Hartm.; Calamagrostis × trinii Rupr.; Calamagrostis × yatabei Maxim.; Deyeuxia × acutiflora (Schrad.) P.Beauv.; Deyeuxia × montana Boiss.; Donax × acutiflorus (Schrad.) P.Beauv.

= Calamagrostis × acutiflora =

Hybrid species of grass

Calamagrostis × acutiflora, called feather reed-grass, is a naturally occurring hybrid species of grass in the genus Calamagrostis, occasionally found in Europe and Asia. Its cultivar 'Karl Foerster' has gained the Royal Horticultural Society's Award of Garden Merit.

It is a hybrid of Calamagrostis arundinacea and Calamagrostis epigejos, both widespread Eurasian species.
