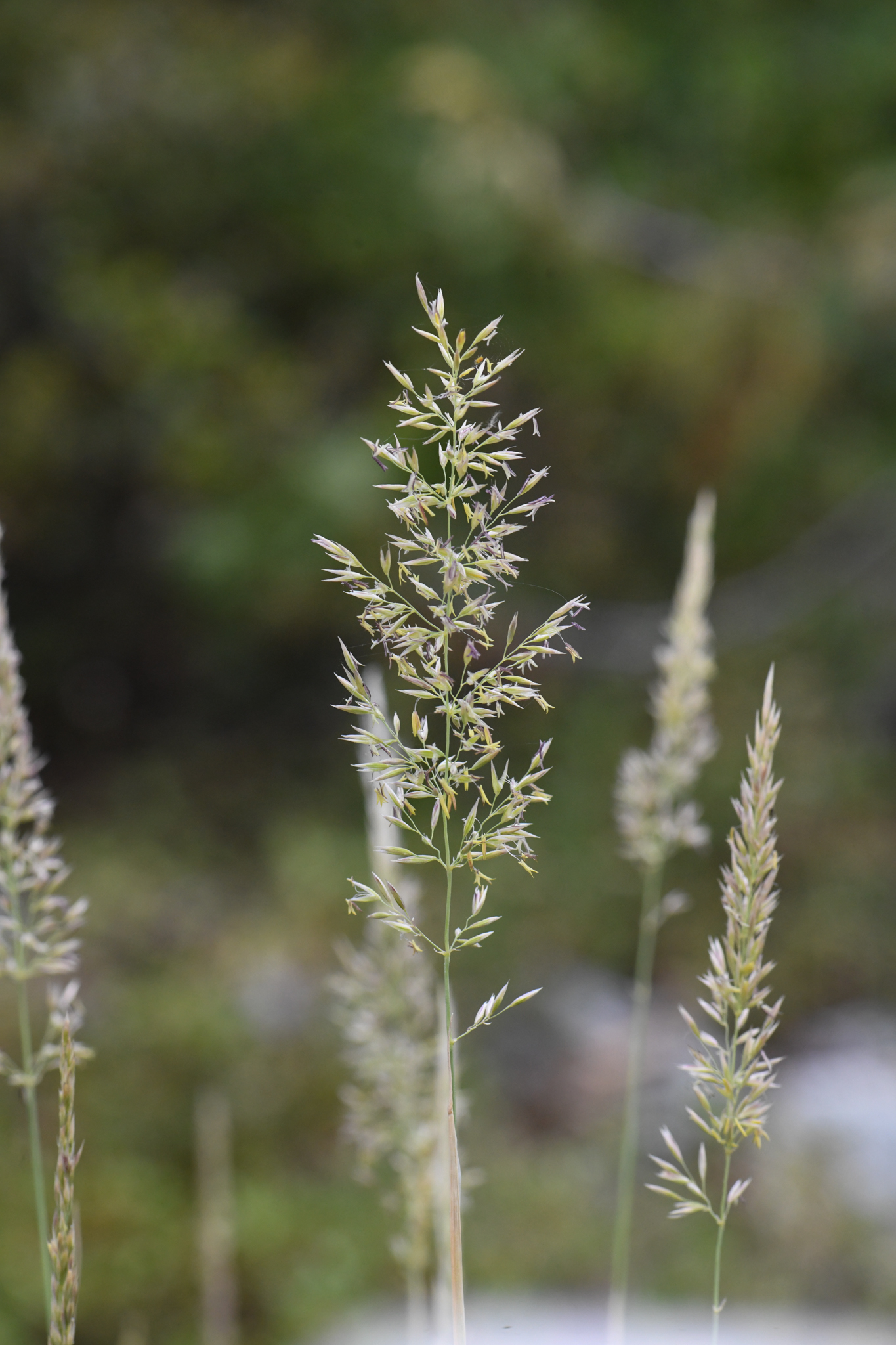
- The inflorescences.

Conservation status
- Secure (NatureServe)

Scientific classification
- Kingdom: Plantae
- Clade: Tracheophytes
- Clade: Angiosperms
- Clade: Monocots
- Clade: Commelinids
- Order: Poales
- Family: Poaceae
- Subfamily: Pooideae
- Genus: Calamagrostis
- Species: C. koelerioides

Binomial name
- Calamagrostis koelerioides Vasey

Synonyms
- Calamagrostis densa

= Calamagrostis koelerioides =

Species of flowering plant

Calamagrostis koelerioides is a species of perennial bunch grass in the family Poaceae native to western North America commonly known as the fire reedgrass, dense-pine reedgrass, pineland reedgrass, or San Diego reedgrass. It ranges from California north to Washington, Idaho, Montana, and Wyoming. It is found in many habitat types, including mountain meadows, chaparral, pine and spruce forests, and on slopes, dry hills, and ridges.

== Description ==
Calamagrostis koelerioides is a rhizomatous perennial grass of cespitose habit. The stout rhizomes are 2–6 cm (0.79–2.36 in) long and 2–4 mm (0.079–0.157 in) thick. The stems are 60–100 cm (24–39 in) long with 3 to 5 nodes. The sheaths and collars are glabrous and usually scabrous, or rarely smooth. The ligule is membranous and 3–7 mm (0.12–0.28 in) long. The leaf blade is 3–7 mm (0.12–0.28 in) wide and is flat or inrolled, and may be scabrous or smooth.

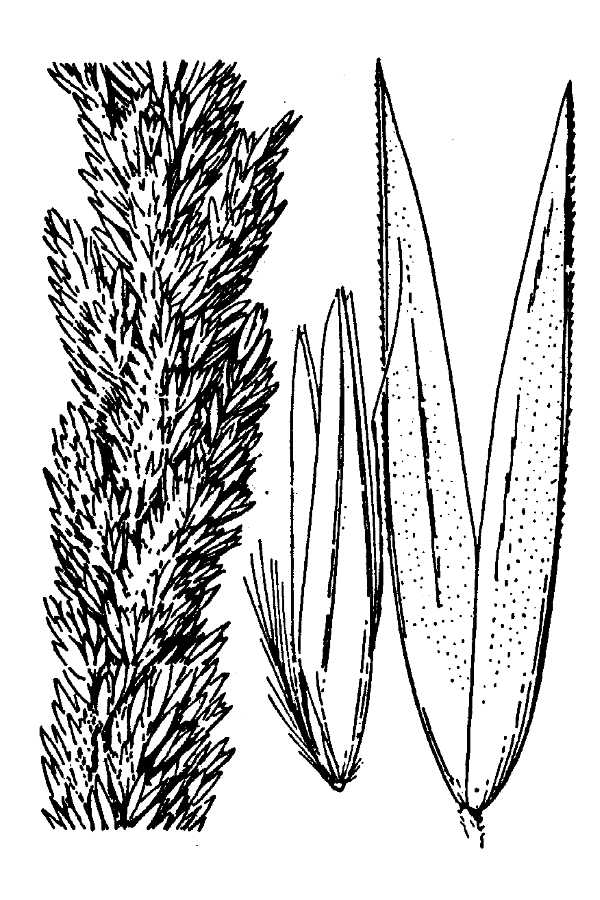
Illustration of the panicle (×1 scale), glumes, and floret (×10 scale)

The inflorescence is 5–16 cm (2.0–6.3 in) tall and generally dense and erect to slightly nodding in habit, and with a straw to pale green to pale purple color. The inflorescence branches are generally less than 3 cm (1.2 in) long and appressed, bearing spikelets to their base. The glumes are scabrous, slightly keeled and 4–6 mm (0.16–0.24 in) long, with callus hairs <2 mm (0.079 in) long. The lemma is 4–5 mm (0.16–0.20 in) long, usually 0.5–1.5 mm (0.020–0.059 in) shorter than the glumes, with a small twisted awn 4–5.5 mm (0.16–0.22 in) long which equals or slightly exceeds the length of the glume tips. This species generally flowers from June to August.

== Taxonomy ==
Calamagrostis koelerioides and C. densa were first described by George Vasey in 1891, based on specimens collected near Julian, California by Charles Russell Orcutt. The two species were originally separated based on their difference in size, with C. densa being larger. William James Beal would later merge C. densa into a variety of C. koelerioides.

C. koelerioides has been found to form a clade with its sister species, C. ophitidis, and C. foliosa, sharing overlapping distributions but differing in their ecology. Morphologically, C. koelerioides is similar to C. rubescens. The two are traditionally distinguished by the presence of hairs on the leaf collars of C. rubescens, with the hairs absent in C. koelerioides. More reliable characters for differentiation are the longer lemmas, glumes, and awns of C. koelerioides when compared to C. rubescens. Tall plants of C. koelerioides may also appear similar to C. nutkaensis.

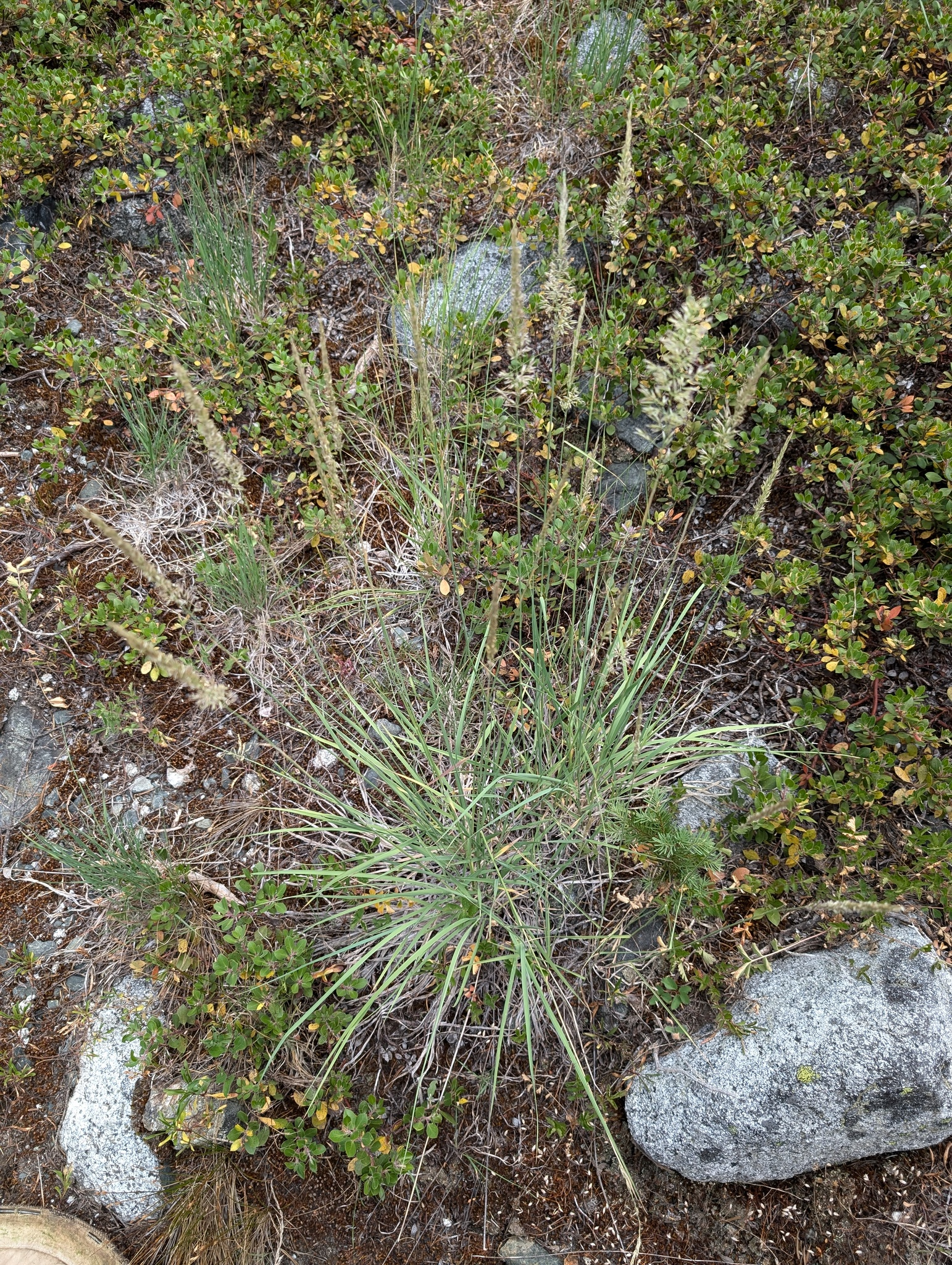
C. koelerioides in habitat

== Distribution and habitat ==
Calamagrostis koelerioides is native to the western United States. It shares a partial sympatric distribution with its close relatives C. foliosa and C. ophitidis in Northern California and the California Coast Ranges, but extends further north to the states of Washington, Idaho, Montana, and Wyoming. It is also found further south in the Peninsular Ranges of Southern California. Ira Loren Wiggins reported C. koelerioides (as C. densa) for northern Baja California, but there are no recorded specimens that verify his claim.
