= C. fulgida =

C. fulgida may refer to:

- Calamagrostis fulgida, a South American grass
- Canna fulgida, a garden plant
- Cavia fulgida, a guinea pig
- Charidea fulgida, a New World moth
- Chrysaora fulgida, a jellyfish with four oral arms
- Chrysis fulgida, a cuckoo wasp
- Cicindela fulgida, a tiger beetle
- Cingulopsis fulgida, a sea snail
- Cyclaspis fulgida, a hooded shrimp
- Cylindropuntia fulgida, a cholla cactus
