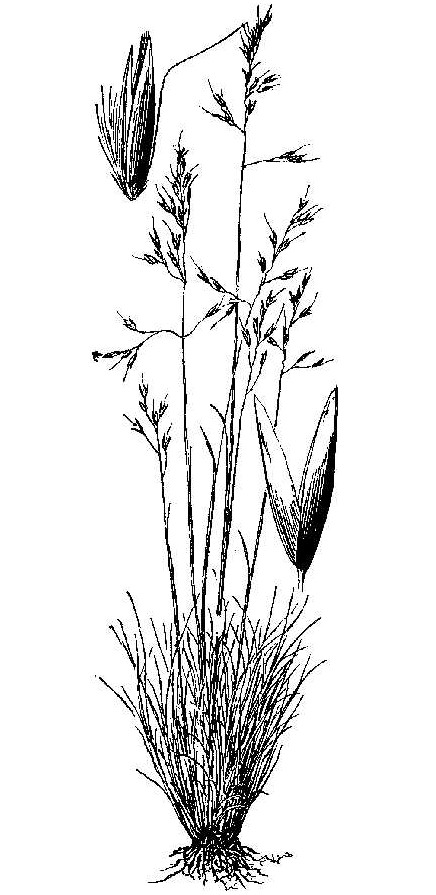

Conservation status
- Vulnerable (NatureServe)

Scientific classification
- Kingdom: Plantae
- Clade: Tracheophytes
- Clade: Angiosperms
- Clade: Monocots
- Clade: Commelinids
- Order: Poales
- Family: Poaceae
- Subfamily: Pooideae
- Genus: Calamagrostis
- Species: C. breweri

Binomial name
- Calamagrostis breweri Thurb.

Synonyms
- Calamagrostis lemmonii

= Calamagrostis breweri =

Species of flowering plant

Calamagrostis breweri is a species of grass known by the common name shorthair reedgrass.

== Distribution ==
It is native to the mountains of Northern California and Oregon, where it usually grow in forests and meadows in subalpine and alpine climates.

== Description ==
This is a perennial grass without rhizomes which form tufts and bunches up to about 50 centimeters in maximum height, but generally shorter. The small, sparse leaves are mainly located at the base of the stems. The inflorescence is small, scattered and reddish, with spikelet about half a centimeter long.

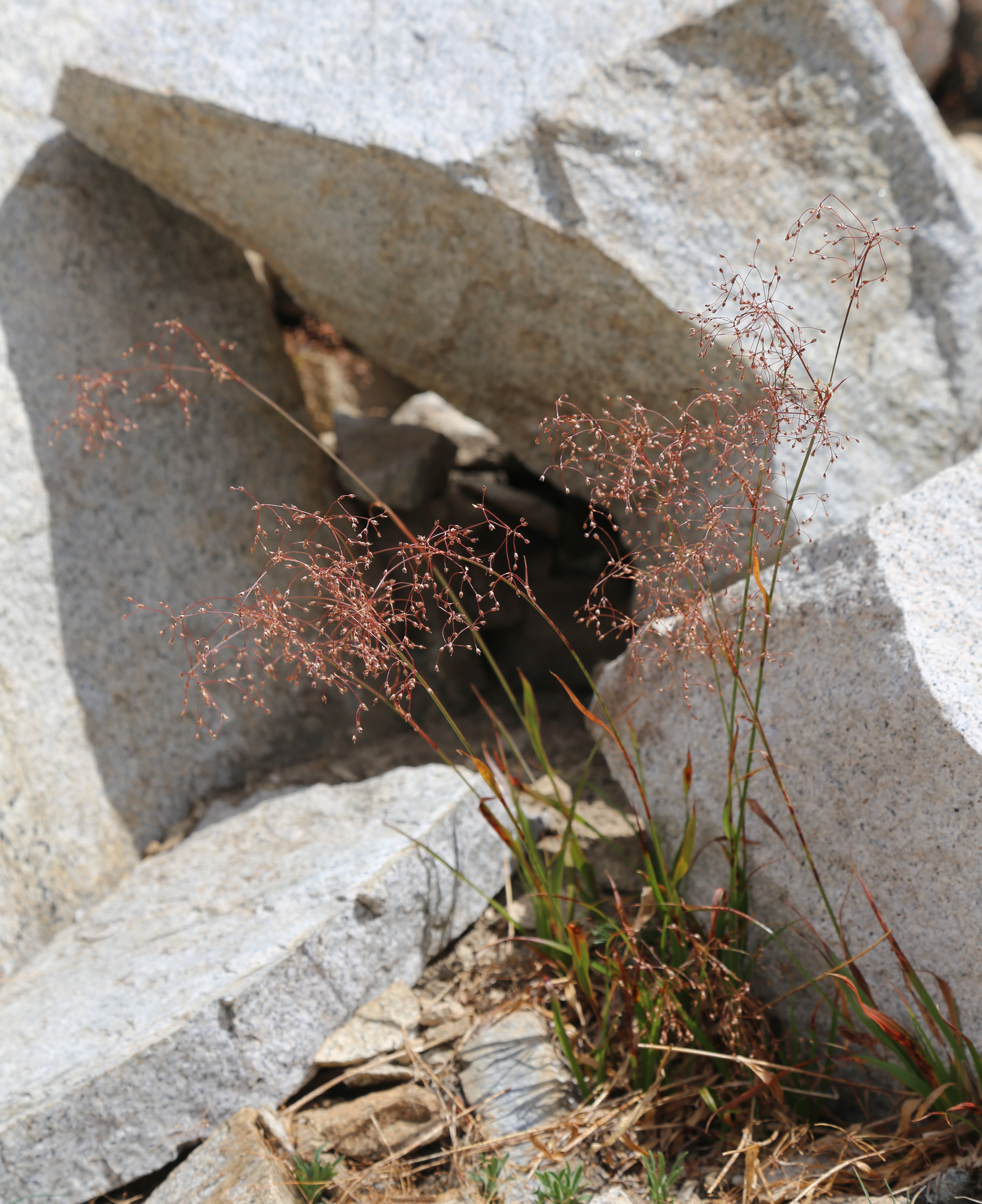
Calamagrostis breweri clump in rocks at 11,000 ft (3,400 m)
