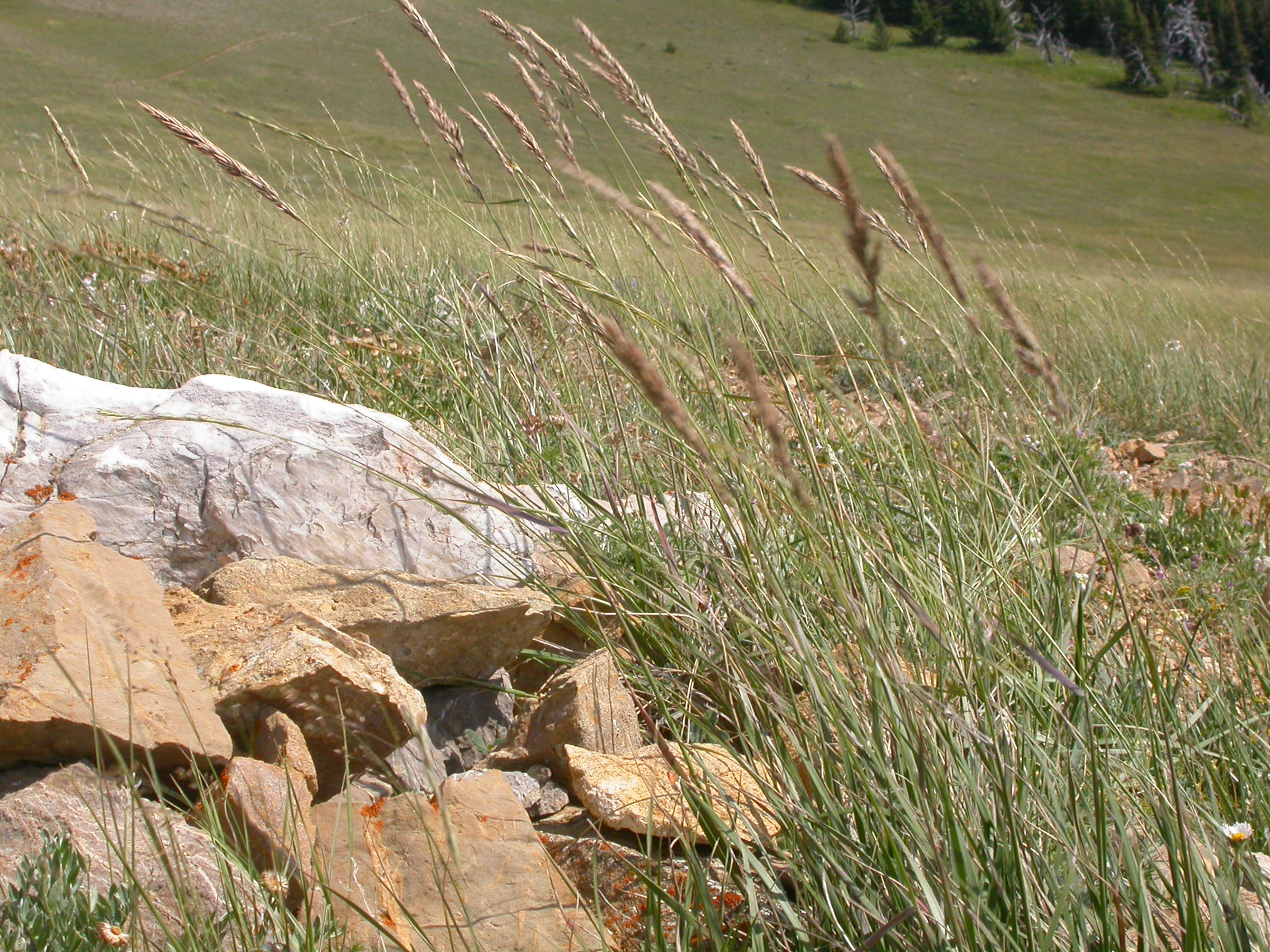

Scientific classification
- Kingdom: Plantae
- Clade: Tracheophytes
- Clade: Angiosperms
- Clade: Monocots
- Clade: Commelinids
- Order: Poales
- Family: Poaceae
- Subfamily: Pooideae
- Genus: Calamagrostis
- Species: C. purpurascens

Binomial name
- Calamagrostis purpurascens R.Br.

Synonyms
- Arundo purpurascens (R.Br.) Schult. & Schult.f.; C. arctica Vasey; C. arundinacea f. purpurascens (R.Br.) Gelert in Ostenf.; C. a. var. purpurascens (R.Br.) Porsild; C. caespitosa V.N.Vassil.; C. lepageana Louis-Marie; C. maltei (Polunin) Á.Löve & D.Löve; C. purpurascens subsp. maltei (Polunin) A.E.Porsild; C. p. var. arctica (Vasey) Kearney; C. p. var. maltei Polunin; C. p. var. ophitidis J.T.Howell; C. p. var. vaseyi (Beal) M.E.Jones; C. sylvatica var. americana Vasey; C. s. var. purpurascens Thurb. ex Vasey; C. vaseyi Beal; C. wiluica Litv. ex Petrov; C. yukonensis Nash; Deschampsia congestiformis W.E.Booth; Deyeuxia robusta Phil.; Trisetum sesquiflorum Trin.^{List sources :}

= Calamagrostis purpurascens =

Species of grass

Calamagrostis purpurascens, is a perennial grass commonly known as purple reedgrass, purple pinegrass, or alpine reedgrass.

== Description ==
Calamagrostis purpurascens is a large, clump forming, perennial grass; growing 30–80 cm (12–31 in) tall. It grows from short rhizomes and has dense, often purpled tinted flower heads that are 4 to 13 cm (1.6 to 5.1 in) long. It has one flowered spikelets, two subequal glumes, and lemma with a dorsal awn. The awn is longer than the glum and sharply bent, and longer than the tip of the spikelet. Flowering stems have typically one or two leaves.

== Distribution ==
Calamagrostis purpurascens is native from arctic Greenland, to much of Canada (Alberta, British Columbia, Manitoba, Newfoundland, Northwest Territories, Nunavut, Ontario, Quebec, Saskatchewan, and Yukon Territory) and the western and northern U.S. (Alaska, California, Colorado, Idaho, Minnesota, Montana, Nevada, New Mexico, Oregon, South Dakota, Utah, Washington, and Wyoming). It is rare and scattered in the southern U.S. states, such as Louisiana, where it is a post-glacial relict.

Further south, C. purpurascens is also known in Chile, where it was recorded by Rodolfo Amando Philippi in 1860. Philippi gave it the name Deyeuxia robusta, now relegated to synonymy.

It is also found in Asia (in eastern Siberia).

== Habitat ==
Calamagrostis purpurascens grows in dry mountainous zones, from high up on the foothills to close to the snow-line, often taking root in gaps in the talus, where few other plants can grow. It is an arctic-alpine species with disjunct boreal populations in eastern North America. In Minnesota it is an endangered species found growing in the north eastern part of the state in the coniferous region in Cook county where it is found on tall north facing cliffs composed of slate and diabase; these locations are cool, moist, and lack heavy competition from other plant species.

== Ecology ==
Carterocephalus palaemon (arctic skipper) butterflies eat the nectar from C. purpurascens flowers, and their caterpillars feed on the shoots. Ovis canadensis (bighorn sheep) are known to graze this grass.
