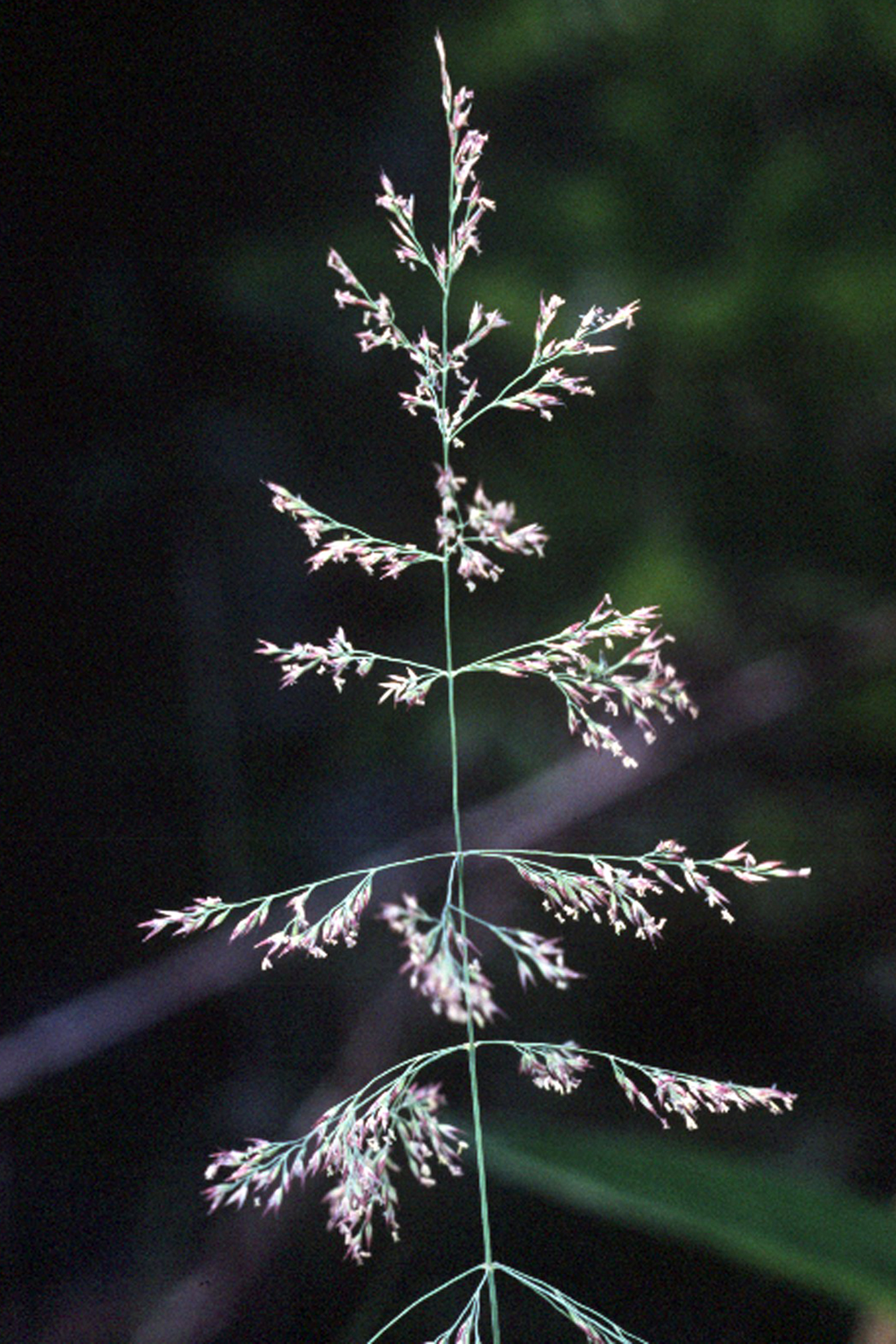
- Calamagrostis canadensis

Scientific classification
- Kingdom: Plantae
- Clade: Tracheophytes
- Clade: Angiosperms
- Clade: Monocots
- Clade: Commelinids
- Order: Poales
- Family: Poaceae
- Subfamily: Pooideae
- Supertribe: Poodae
- Tribe: Poeae
- Subtribe: Agrostidinae
- Genus: Calamagrostis; Adans.

Type species
- Calamagrostis epigejos (L.) Roth

Synonyms
- × Ammocalamagrostis P.Fourn.; Ancistrochloa Honda; Anisachne Keng; Athernotus Dulac; Cinnagrostis Griseb.; Chamaecalamus Meyen; Deyeuxia Clarion ex P.Beauv.; Sclerodeyeuxia Pilg.; Stilpnophleum Nevski; Stylagrostis Mez

= Calamagrostis =

Genus of grasses

Calamagrostis (reed grass or smallweed) is a genus of flowering plants in the grass family Poaceae, with about 260 species that occur mainly in temperate regions of the globe. Towards equatorial latitudes, species of Calamagrostis generally occur at higher elevations. These tufted perennials usually have hairless narrow leaves. The ligules are usually blunt. The inflorescence forms a panicle. Some may be reed-like.

The plants may be rhizomatous (underground stems with shoots), stoloniferous (with runners), or caespitose (growing in tufts or clumps). The bisexual spikelets have a single floret and generally they are purple or purple-brown. The spikelets are clustered into inflorescences, which usually develop in early- to mid-summer on long culms ( = stems).

Many species of Calamagrostis are morphologically similar, but they generally occur in distinct habitats, and they have unique geographical distributions. Given the subtle distinctions between many closely related taxa, there are several species complexes that could benefit from additional systematic study. Even the generic boundaries of the genus are controversial. For example, species in the genus Deyeuxia (named after French chemist Nicolas Deyeux), distributed largely in the southern hemisphere are morphologically very similar to species of Calamagrostis. It may be appropriate to recognize all of these species in a single genus, but this will require detailed scientific study of DNA of species from around the world.

Some Calamagrostis can be very decorative, and are widely cultivated largely in northern temperate zones. The species Calamagrostis brachytricha and the cultivar Calamagrostis × acutiflora 'Karl Foerster' are recipients of the Royal Horticultural Society's Award of Garden Merit.

The word "Calamagrostis" is derived from the Greek word kalamos (reed) and agrostis (a kind of grass).

== Species ==
Calamagrostis contains the following recognised species:

- Calamagrostis abnormis (Hook.f.) U.Shukla
- Calamagrostis acuminata (Vickery) Govaerts
- Calamagrostis × acutiflora (Schrad.) DC.
- Calamagrostis affinis (M.Gray) Govaerts
- Calamagrostis ajanensis Kharkev. & Prob.
- Calamagrostis alajica Litv.
- Calamagrostis alba (J.Presl) Steud.
- Calamagrostis albiflora Vaniot
- Calamagrostis altaica Tzvelev
- Calamagrostis amoena (Pilg.) Pilg.
- Calamagrostis ampliflora Tovar
- Calamagrostis × andrejewii Litv.
- Calamagrostis angustifolia Kom.
- Calamagrostis anthoxanthoides (Munro) Regel
- Calamagrostis appressa (Vickery) Govaerts
- Calamagrostis archboldii Hitchc.
- Calamagrostis arundinacea (L.) Roth
- Calamagrostis atjehensis Ohwi
- Calamagrostis aurea (Munro) Hack. ex Sodiro
- Calamagrostis australis (Moritzi) Buse
- Calamagrostis austrodensa Govaerts
- Calamagrostis austroscaberula Govaerts
- Calamagrostis autumnalis Koidz.
- Calamagrostis avenoides (Hook.f.) Cockayne
- Calamagrostis × badzhalensis Prob.
- Calamagrostis baicalensis (Litv.) Steph. ex Komarov
- Calamagrostis balkharica P.A.Smirn.
- Calamagrostis benthamiana (Vickery) Govaerts
- Calamagrostis × bihariensis Simonk.
- Calamagrostis bogotensis (Pilg.) Pilg.
- Calamagrostis bolanderi Thurb.
- Calamagrostis boliviensis Hack.
- Calamagrostis borii Tzvelev
- Calamagrostis boyacensis Swallen & Garc.-Barr.
- Calamagrostis brachyathera (Stapf) Govaerts
- Calamagrostis brassii Hitchc.
- Calamagrostis breviaristata (Wedd.) Pilg.
- Calamagrostis brevifolia (J.Presl) Steud.
- Calamagrostis breweri Thurb.
- Calamagrostis cabrerae Parodi
- Calamagrostis cainii Hitchc.
- Calamagrostis calderillensis Pilg.
- Calamagrostis canadensis (Michx.) P.Beauv.
- Calamagrostis canescens (Weber) Roth
- Calamagrostis carchiensis Laegaard
- Calamagrostis carinata (Vickery) Govaerts
- Calamagrostis caucasica Trin.
- Calamagrostis cephalantha Pilg.
- Calamagrostis chalybaea (Laest.) Fr.
- Calamagrostis chaseae Luces
- Calamagrostis chilensis Phil.
- Calamagrostis chrysantha (J.Presl) Steud.
- Calamagrostis chrysophylla (Phil.) Govaerts
- Calamagrostis cleefii Escalona
- Calamagrostis clipeata Vaniot
- Calamagrostis coahuilensis P.M.Peterson, Soreng & Valde's-Reyna
- Calamagrostis coarctata Eaton
- Calamagrostis conferta (Keng) P.C.Kuo & S.L.Lu
- Calamagrostis × conwentzii Ulbr.
- Calamagrostis cordechii Govaerts
- Calamagrostis crassiuscula (Vickery) Govaerts
- Calamagrostis crispa (Rugolo & Villav.) Govaerts
- Calamagrostis cryptolopha (Wedd.) Hitchc.
- Calamagrostis curta (Wedd.) Hitchc.
- Calamagrostis curtoides (Rugolo & Villav.) Govaerts
- Calamagrostis curvula (Wedd.) Pilg.
- Calamagrostis cuzcoensis Tovar
- Calamagrostis × czerepanovii Husseinov
- Calamagrostis debilis Hook.f.
- Calamagrostis decipiens (R.Br.) Govaerts
- Calamagrostis decora Hook.f.
- Calamagrostis densiflora (J.Presl) Steud.
- Calamagrostis deschampsiiformis C.E.Hubb.
- Calamagrostis deschampsioides Trin.
- Calamagrostis deserticola (Phil.) Phil.
- Calamagrostis diemii (Rúgolo) Soreng
- Calamagrostis diffusa (Keng) Keng f.
- Calamagrostis distantifolia Luchnik
- Calamagrostis divaricata P.M.Peterson & Soreng
- Calamagrostis divergens Swallen
- Calamagrostis dmitrievae Tzvelev
- Calamagrostis drummondii (Steud.) Govaerts
- Calamagrostis effusiflora (Rendle) P.C.Kuo & S.L.Lu ex J.L.Yang
- Calamagrostis elatior (Griseb.) A.Camus
- Calamagrostis eminens (J.Presl) Steud.
- Calamagrostis emodensis Griseb.
- Calamagrostis epigejos (L.) Roth
- Calamagrostis erectifolia Hitchc.
- Calamagrostis eriantha (Kunth) Steud.
- Calamagrostis expansa (Munro ex Hillebr.) Hitchc.
- Calamagrostis fauriei Hack.
- Calamagrostis fibrovaginata Laegaard
- Calamagrostis fiebrigii Pilg.
- Calamagrostis filifolia Merr.
- Calamagrostis filipes (Keng) P.C.Kuo & S.L.Lu ex J.L.Yang
- Calamagrostis flaccida Keng f.
- Calamagrostis foliosa Kearney
- Calamagrostis frigida (Benth.) Maiden & Betche
- Calamagrostis fulgida Laegaard
- Calamagrostis fulva (Griseb.) Kuntze
- Calamagrostis fuscata (J.Presl) Steud.
- Calamagrostis gayana (Steud.) Soreng
- Calamagrostis gigas Takeda
- Calamagrostis glacialis (Wedd.) Hitchc.
- Calamagrostis griffithii (Bor) G.Singh
- Calamagrostis guamanensis Escalona
- Calamagrostis guatemalensis Hitchc.
- Calamagrostis gunniana (Nees) Reeder
- Calamagrostis hackelii Lillo ex Stuck.
- Calamagrostis hakonensis Franch. & Sav.
- Calamagrostis × hartmaniana Fr.
- Calamagrostis × haussknechtiana Torges
- Calamagrostis hedbergii Melderis
- Calamagrostis henryi (Rendle) P.C.Kuo & S.L.Lu ex J.L.Yang
- Calamagrostis heterophylla (Wedd.) Pilg.
- Calamagrostis hieronymi Hack.
- Calamagrostis hillebrandii (Munro ex Hillebr.) C.L.Hitchc.
- Calamagrostis hirta (Sodiro ex Mille) Laegaard
- Calamagrostis holciformis Jaub. & Spach
- Calamagrostis holmii Lange
- Calamagrostis howellii Vasey
- Calamagrostis hupehensis (Rendle) Chase
- Calamagrostis imbricata (Vickery) Govaerts
- Calamagrostis inaequalis (Vickery) Govaerts
- Calamagrostis inexpansa A.Gray
- Calamagrostis insperata Swallen
- Calamagrostis intermedia (J.Presl) Steud.
- Calamagrostis involuta Swallen
- Calamagrostis jamesonii Steud.
- Calamagrostis kalarica Tzvelev
- Calamagrostis kengii T.F.Wang
- Calamagrostis killipii Swallen
- Calamagrostis koelerioides Vasey
- Calamagrostis kokonorica Keng ex Tzvelev
- Calamagrostis korotkyi Litv.
- Calamagrostis korshinskyi Litv.
- Calamagrostis × kotulae Zapal.
- Calamagrostis × kuznetzovii Tzvelev
- Calamagrostis lahulensis G.Singh
- Calamagrostis lapponica (Wahlenb.) Hartm.
- Calamagrostis lawrencei (Vickery) Govaerts
- Calamagrostis leiophylla (Wedd.) Hitchc.
- Calamagrostis leonardii Chase
- Calamagrostis levipes (Keng) P.C.Kuo & S.L.Lu ex J.L.Yang
- Calamagrostis licentiana Hand.-Mazz.
- Calamagrostis ligulata (Kunth) Hitchc.
- Calamagrostis linifolia Govaerts
- Calamagrostis llanganatensis Laegaard
- Calamagrostis longiseta Hack.
- Calamagrostis macbridei Tovar
- Calamagrostis macilenta (Griseb.) Litv.
- Calamagrostis macrophylla (Pilg.) Pilg.
- Calamagrostis malamalensis Hack. ex Stuck.
- Calamagrostis mandoniana (Wedd.) Pilg.
- Calamagrostis matsumurae Maxim.
- Calamagrostis mckiei (Vickery) Govaerts
- Calamagrostis menhoferi Govaerts
- Calamagrostis mesathera (Vickery) Govaerts
- Calamagrostis microseta (Vickery) Govaerts
- Calamagrostis minarovii Hüseyin
- Calamagrostis minima (Pilg.) Tovar
- Calamagrostis minor (Benth.) J.M.Black
- Calamagrostis mollis Pilg.
- Calamagrostis montanensis (Scribn.) Scribn. ex Vasey
- Calamagrostis moupinensis Franch.
- Calamagrostis muiriana B.L.Wilson & Sami Gray
- Calamagrostis mulleri Luces
- Calamagrostis munroi Boiss.
- Calamagrostis nagarum (Bor) G.Singh
- Calamagrostis nardifolia (Griseb.) Hack. ex Stuck.
- Calamagrostis neesii Steud.
- Calamagrostis neocontracta Govaerts
- Calamagrostis niitakayamensis Honda
- Calamagrostis ningxiaensis D.Z.Ma & J.N.Li
- Calamagrostis nitidula Pilg.
- Calamagrostis nivicola (Hook.f.) Hand.-Mazz.
- Calamagrostis nudiflora (Vickery) Govaerts
- Calamagrostis nutkaensis (J.Presl) Steud.
- Calamagrostis obtusata Trin.
- Calamagrostis ophitidis (Howell) Nygren
- Calamagrostis orbignyana (Wedd.) Pilg.
- Calamagrostis orizabae (Rupr. ex E.Fourn.) Beal
- Calamagrostis ovata (J.Presl) Steud.
- Calamagrostis × paradoxa Lipsky
- Calamagrostis parsana (Bor) M.Dogan
- Calamagrostis parviseta (Vickery) Reeder
- Calamagrostis patagonica (Speg.) Makloskie
- Calamagrostis pavlovii (Roshev.) Roshev.
- Calamagrostis perplexa Scribn.
- Calamagrostis petelotii (Hitchc.) Govaerts
- Calamagrostis pickeringii A.Gray
- Calamagrostis pinetorum Swallen
- Calamagrostis pisinna Swallen
- Calamagrostis pittieri Hack.
- Calamagrostis planifolia (Kunth) Trin. ex Steud.
- Calamagrostis poluninii T.J.Sørensen
- Calamagrostis polycephala Vaniot
- Calamagrostis polygama (Griseb.) Parodi
- Calamagrostis × ponojensis Montell
- Calamagrostis porteri A.Gray
- Calamagrostis × prahliana Torges
- Calamagrostis preslii (Kunth) Hitchc.
- Calamagrostis pringlei Beal
- Calamagrostis przevalskyi Tzvelev
- Calamagrostis × pseudodeschampsioides Tzvelev
- Calamagrostis pseudophragmites (Haller f.) Koeler
- Calamagrostis pungens Tovar
- Calamagrostis purpurascens R.Br.
- Calamagrostis purpurea (Trin.) Trin.
- Calamagrostis pusilla Reeder
- Calamagrostis quadriseta (Labill.) Spreng.
- Calamagrostis radicans Vaniot
- Calamagrostis ramonae Escalona
- Calamagrostis rauhii Tovar
- Calamagrostis recta (Kunth) Trin. ex Steud.
- Calamagrostis reflexa (Vickery) Govaerts
- Calamagrostis reitzii Swallen
- Calamagrostis × rigens Lindgr.
- Calamagrostis rigescens (J.Presl) Scribn.
- Calamagrostis rigida (Kunth) Trin. ex Steud.
- Calamagrostis rodwayi (Vickery) Govaerts
- Calamagrostis rosea (Griseb.) Hack.
- Calamagrostis rubescens Buckley
- Calamagrostis rupestris Trin.
- Calamagrostis sachalinensis F.Schmidt
- Calamagrostis sajanensis Malyschev
- Calamagrostis salina Tzvelev
- Calamagrostis scaberula Swallen
- Calamagrostis scabrescens Griseb.
- Calamagrostis scabriflora Swallen
- Calamagrostis sclerantha Hack.
- Calamagrostis sclerophylla (Stapf) Hitchc.
- Calamagrostis scopulorum M.E.Jones
- Calamagrostis scotica (Druce) Druce
- Calamagrostis sesquiflora (Trin.) Tzvelev
- Calamagrostis setiflora (Wedd.) Pilg.
- Calamagrostis sichuanensis J.L.Yang
- Calamagrostis sikangensis (Keng) P.C.Kuo & S.L.Lu ex J.L.Yang
- Calamagrostis sinelatior (Keng) P.C.Kuo & S.L.Lu ex J.L.Yang
- Calamagrostis smirnowii Litv. ex Petrov
- Calamagrostis spicigera (J.Presl) Steud.
- Calamagrostis spruceana (Wedd.) Hack. ex Sodiro
- Calamagrostis srilankensis Davidse
- Calamagrostis staintonii G.Singh
- Calamagrostis stenophylla Hand.-Mazz.
- Calamagrostis steyermarkii Swallen
- Calamagrostis stolizkai Hook.f.
- Calamagrostis stricta (Timm) Koeler
- Calamagrostis × strigosa (Wahlenb.) Hartm.
- Calamagrostis subacrochaeta Nakai
- Calamagrostis × subchalybaea Tzvelev
- Calamagrostis × subepigeios Tzvelev
- Calamagrostis sublanceolata Honda
- Calamagrostis × submonticola Prob.
- Calamagrostis × subneglecta Tzvelev
- Calamagrostis suka Speg.
- Calamagrostis tacomensis K.L.Marr & Hebda
- Calamagrostis tarmensis Pilg.
- Calamagrostis tashiroi Ohwi
- Calamagrostis × tatianae Prob.
- Calamagrostis teberdensis Litv.
- Calamagrostis teretifolia Laegaard
- Calamagrostis tianschanica Rupr.
- Calamagrostis tibetica (Bor) Tzvelev
- Calamagrostis tolucensis (Kunth) Trin. ex Steud.
- Calamagrostis × torgesiana Hausskn.
- Calamagrostis trichodonta (Wedd.) Soreng
- Calamagrostis turkestanica Hack.
- Calamagrostis tweedyi (Scribn.) Scribn.
- Calamagrostis tzvelevii Hüseyin
- Calamagrostis × uralensis Litv.
- Calamagrostis × ussuriensis Tzvelev
- Calamagrostis valida Sohns
- Calamagrostis varia (Schrad.) Host
- Calamagrostis × vassiljevii Tzvelev
- Calamagrostis velutina (Nees & Meyen) Steud.
- Calamagrostis veresczaginii Zolot.
- Calamagrostis vicunarum (Wedd.) Pilg.
- Calamagrostis villosa (Chaix) J.F.Gmel.
- Calamagrostis × vilnensis Besser
- Calamagrostis violacea (Wedd.) Hack.
- Calamagrostis viridiflavescens (Poir.) Steud.
- Calamagrostis viridis (Phil.) Soreng
- Calamagrostis vulcanica Swallen
- Calamagrostis yanyuanensis J.L.Yang
- Calamagrostis × yatabei Maxim.
- Calamagrostis youngii (Hook.f.) Buchanan
- Calamagrostis zenkeri (Trin.) Davidse
- Calamagrostis × zerninensis Lüderw.

=== Formerly placed here ===
- Laegaardia ecuadoriense (Laegaard) P.M.Peterson, Soreng, Romasch. & Barberá (as Calamagrostis ecuadoriensis Laegaard)
- Paramochloa crispifolia (Sylvester) P.M.Peterson, Soreng, Romasch. & Barberá (as Calamagrostis crispifolius Sylvester)
- Paramochloa effusa (Kunth) P.M.Peterson, Soreng, Romasch. & Barberá (as Calamagrostis effusa (Kunth) Steud., C. areantha (Pilg.) Pilg., or C. funckii Steud.)
