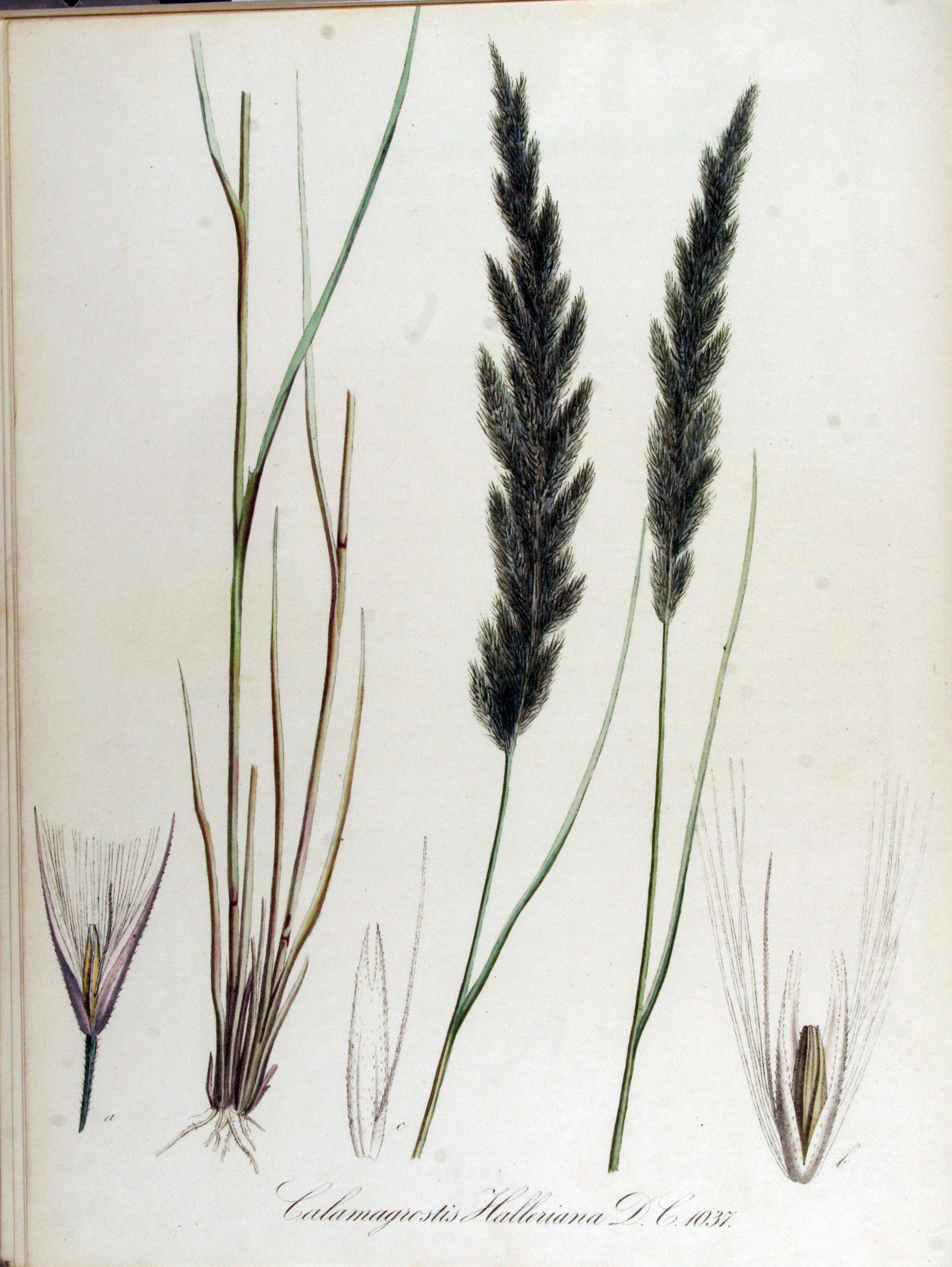

Scientific classification
- Kingdom: Plantae
- Clade: Tracheophytes
- Clade: Angiosperms
- Clade: Monocots
- Clade: Commelinids
- Order: Poales
- Family: Poaceae
- Subfamily: Pooideae
- Genus: Calamagrostis
- Species: C. pseudophragmites

Binomial name
- Calamagrostis pseudophragmites (Haller f.) Koeler

= Calamagrostis pseudophragmites =

Species of grass

Calamagrostis pseudophragmites is a species of grass in the genus Calamagrostis and the family Poaceae. It occurs along water, canals and rivers in Europe. It is a perennial species, blooming in June and July. The stem is smooth and less hairy than the other species in the genus. This grass species grows up to 1.2 meters high, the leaves are approximately 6 mm wide/broad, and roll in their edges/margin. The spikelets in the over-hanging panicle are coloured violet, and the lower bract has a needle on it. The sepals/bracts are longer than those of the spikelets.
