= Calamagrostis hirta =

Conservation status
- Vulnerable (IUCN 3.1)

Scientific classification
- Kingdom: Plantae
- Clade: Tracheophytes
- Clade: Angiosperms
- Clade: Monocots
- Clade: Commelinids
- Order: Poales
- Family: Poaceae
- Subfamily: Pooideae
- Genus: Calamagrostis
- Species: C. hirta

Binomial name
- Calamagrostis hirta (Sodiro ex Mille) Lægaard

Synonyms
- Calamagrostis brevipaleata Deyeuxia hirta

Species of grass

Calamagrostis hirta is a species of grass in the family Poaceae.

It is a bunchgrass that is endemic to Ecuador. It is an IUCN Red List Vulnerable species.
