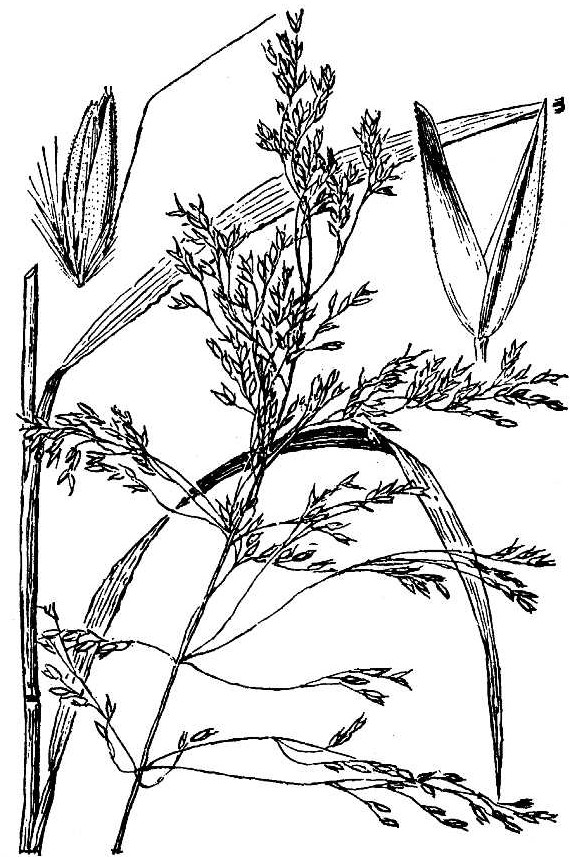

Conservation status
- Apparently Secure (NatureServe)

Scientific classification
- Kingdom: Plantae
- Clade: Tracheophytes
- Clade: Angiosperms
- Clade: Monocots
- Clade: Commelinids
- Order: Poales
- Family: Poaceae
- Subfamily: Pooideae
- Genus: Calamagrostis
- Species: C. bolanderi

Binomial name
- Calamagrostis bolanderi Thurb.

= Calamagrostis bolanderi =

Species of flowering plant

Calamagrostis bolanderi is a species of grass known by the common name Bolander's reedgrass. It is endemic to northern California, where it grows in moist coastal habitat such as temperate coniferous forest, wet meadows and bogs, and coastal scrub.

== Description ==
This is a perennial grass growing to heights between 0.5 and 1.5 meters, each erect stem generally with four nodes. It has flat leaves and open, spreading inflorescences of very small spikelets. Each spikelet is made up of one floret surrounded by a v-shaped pair of smooth bracts.
