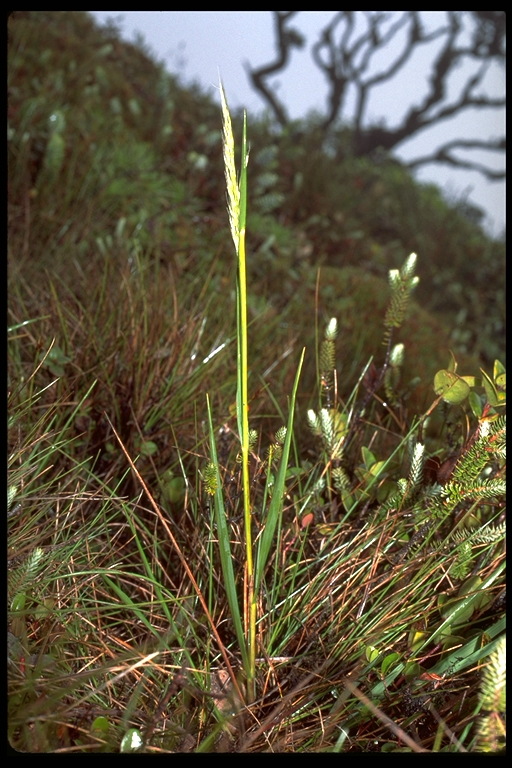

Conservation status
- Endangered (IUCN 3.1)

Scientific classification
- Kingdom: Plantae
- Clade: Tracheophytes
- Clade: Angiosperms
- Clade: Monocots
- Clade: Commelinids
- Order: Poales
- Family: Poaceae
- Subfamily: Pooideae
- Genus: Calamagrostis
- Species: C. hillebrandii

Binomial name
- Calamagrostis hillebrandii (G.Munro ex Hillebr.) Hitchc.

= Calamagrostis hillebrandii =

Species of grass

Calamagrostis hillebrandii is a species of grass in the family Poaceae known commonly as Hillebrand's reedgrass. It is endemic to Maui in Hawaii, where there are only two known subpopulations with a total of perhaps 500 individuals. This is a federally listed endangered species of the United States.
