= Calamagrostis carchiensis =

Conservation status
- Vulnerable (IUCN 3.1)

Scientific classification
- Kingdom: Plantae
- Clade: Tracheophytes
- Clade: Angiosperms
- Clade: Monocots
- Clade: Commelinids
- Order: Poales
- Family: Poaceae
- Subfamily: Pooideae
- Genus: Calamagrostis
- Species: C. carchiensis

Binomial name
- Calamagrostis carchiensis Lægaard

Species of grass

Calamagrostis carchiensis is a species of grass in the family Poaceae. It is found only in Ecuador.
