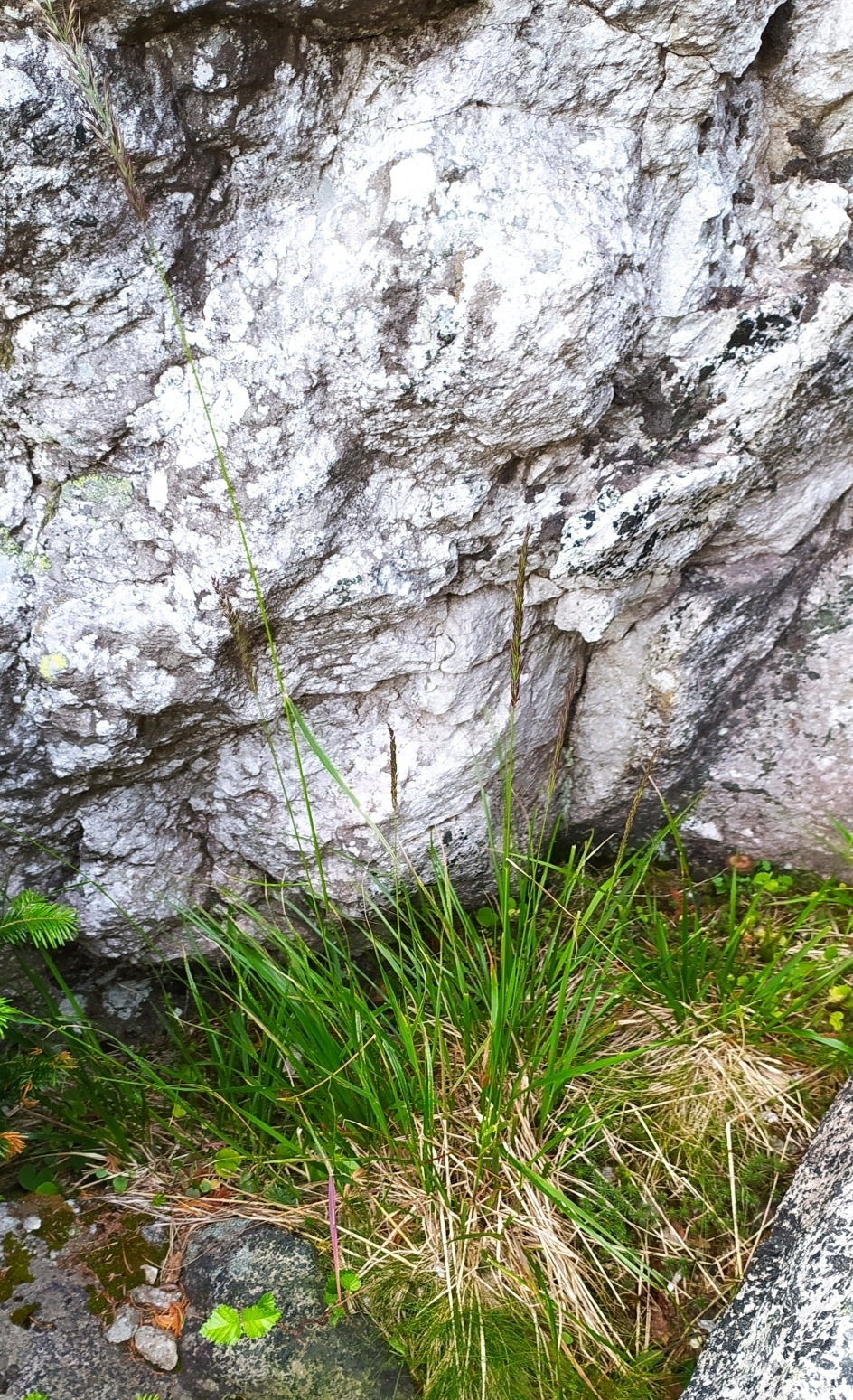

Scientific classification
- Kingdom: Plantae
- Clade: Tracheophytes
- Clade: Angiosperms
- Clade: Monocots
- Clade: Commelinids
- Order: Poales
- Family: Poaceae
- Subfamily: Pooideae
- Genus: Calamagrostis
- Species: C. lapponica

Binomial name
- Calamagrostis lapponica (Wahlenb.) Hartman

Synonyms
- Arundo confinis Willd.; Arundo lapponica Wahlenb.; Calamagrostis alaskana Kearney; Calamagrostis confinis (Willd.) P. Beauv.; Calamagrostis gorodkovii V.N. Vassil.; Calamagrostis henriettae Petrov; Calamagrostis lancea Ohwi; Calamagrostis lapponica subsp. sibirica (Petrov) Tzvelev; Calamagrostis lapponica var. gorodkowii Litv. ex Krylov; Calamagrostis lapponica var. groenlandica Lange; Calamagrostis lapponica var. nearctica A.E. Porsild; Calamagrostis lapponica var. opima Hartm.; Calamagrostis neglecta var. confinis (Willd.) Beal; Calamagrostis pseudolapponica V.N. Vassil.; Calamagrostis sibirica Petrov; Deyeuxia confinis (Willd.) Kunth; Deyeuxia lapponica (Wahlenb.) Kunth

= Calamagrostis lapponica =

Species of grass

Calamagrostis lapponica, the Lappland reedgrass, is a grass species native to colder parts of the Northern Hemisphere. It has been reported from Scandinavia, Russia, Greenland, Alaska, and every Canadian province and territory except the Maritime Provinces (Nova Scotia, New Brunswick and Prince Edward Island).

Calamagrostis lapponica is an herb growing up to 60 cm (24 inches) tall. It spreads by means of short underground rhizomes. Panicle is up to 15 cm (6 inches) long, frequently purple.
