= Calamagrostis eminens =

Scientific classification
- Kingdom: Plantae
- Clade: Tracheophytes
- Clade: Angiosperms
- Clade: Monocots
- Clade: Commelinids
- Order: Poales
- Family: Poaceae
- Subfamily: Pooideae
- Genus: Calamagrostis
- Species: C. eminens

Binomial name
- Calamagrostis eminens (J. Presl) Steud.

Synonyms
- Deyeuxia elegans Wedd.; Calamagrostis elegans (Wedd.) Henrard, 1921

Species of grass

Calamagrostis eminens is a grass species in the genus Calamagrostis. It is found in South America.
