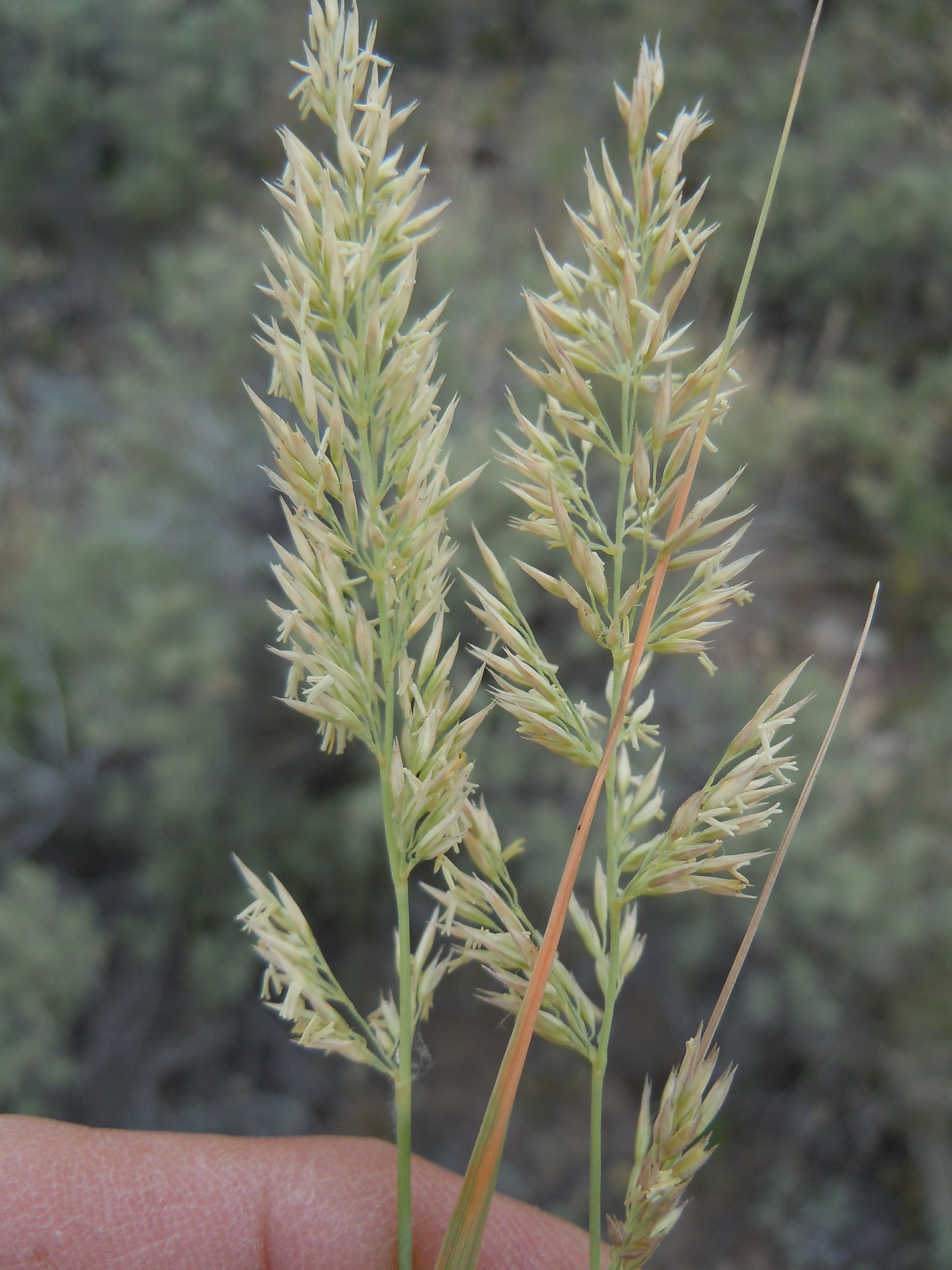

Conservation status
- Secure (NatureServe)

Scientific classification
- Kingdom: Plantae
- Clade: Tracheophytes
- Clade: Angiosperms
- Clade: Monocots
- Clade: Commelinids
- Order: Poales
- Family: Poaceae
- Subfamily: Pooideae
- Genus: Calamagrostis
- Species: C. montanensis

Binomial name
- Calamagrostis montanensis Scribn. ex Vasey

= Calamagrostis montanensis =

Species of flowering plant

Calamagrostis montanensis is a species of grass known by the common names plains reedgrass and prairie reedgrass. It is native to North America, where it is found across Canada from British Columbia to Manitoba and south to Colorado in the United States.

This plant is a perennial grass growing a single stem, not forming a tuft or clump. It grows up to 60 centimeters tall. It has a network of thin rhizomes and roots that hold the soil, forming sod. The roots have been observed to penetrate over a meter deep in the soil. The stiff, rolled leaves are mostly located around the base of the stem and reach up to 15 centimeters long by just a few millimeters wide. The inflorescence is a narrow panicle up to 10 centimeters long. The spikelet contains one flower. The plant reproduces vegetatively by sprouting from its rhizome and sexually by its wind-dispersed seed.

This grass occurs in a number of habitat types, including temperate coniferous forest, sagebrush, shrubsteppe, and several types of prairie and grassland. It is a dominant grass species in several regions in the Great Basin and Great Plains. It tolerates cold winters and hot summers. It is common in disturbed habitat. It grows in all stages of ecological succession and is a climax species in some regions, such as the Canadian mixed-grass prairie and the mountains and foothills of Montana.

This is the only Calamagrostis that provides forage for grazing livestock on the northern Great Plains. It is consumed by cattle and horses, and less often by sheep. It is not a favorite forage plant for livestock because its leaves are coarse in texture.
