= Calamagrostis nardifolia =

Scientific classification
- Kingdom: Plantae
- Clade: Tracheophytes
- Clade: Angiosperms
- Clade: Monocots
- Clade: Commelinids
- Order: Poales
- Family: Poaceae
- Subfamily: Pooideae
- Genus: Calamagrostis
- Species: C. nardifolia

Binomial name
- Calamagrostis nardifolia (Griseb.) Hack. ex Stuck.

Synonyms
- Agrostis canescens Griseb. non (L.) Salisb.; Agrostis nardifolia Griseb.; Deyeuxia nardifolia (Griseb.) Phil.; Deyeuxia trisetoides Phil.

Species of grass

Calamagrostis nardifolia is a species of grass native to the southern Andes.

== Description ==
Calamagrostis nardifolia grows up to 15 centimetres (5.9 in) high, and bears a panicle of flowers, 1–5 cm (0.4–2.0 in) by 0.8–1.0 cm (0.3–0.4 in). Each spikelet is 5.0–6.8 millimetres (0.20–0.27 in) long and contains a single fertile floret.

== Ecology ==
Calamagrostis nardifolia is one of the fodder species preferred by vicuñas during the wet season.
