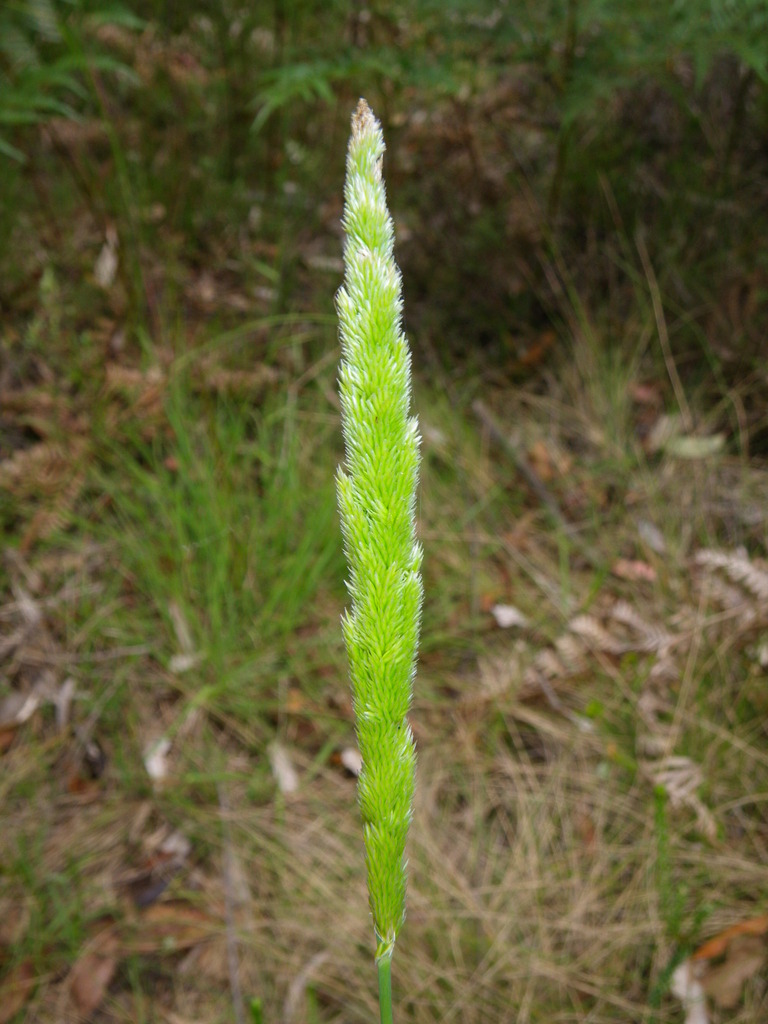
- Cathedral Rock National Park, 22 December 2010

Scientific classification
- Kingdom: Plantae
- Clade: Tracheophytes
- Clade: Angiosperms
- Clade: Monocots
- Clade: Commelinids
- Order: Poales
- Family: Poaceae
- Subfamily: Pooideae
- Genus: Calamagrostis
- Species: C. imbricata

Binomial name
- Calamagrostis imbricata (Vickery) Govaerts

Synonyms
- Deyeuxia imbricata Vickery

= Calamagrostis imbricata =

Species of grass

Calamagrostis imbricata (common name - bent-grass) is a species of grass in the family Poaceae, native to the eastern states of Australia (Queensland, New South Wales and Victoria). It was first described in 1940 by Joyce Vickery as Deyeuxia imbricata. In 1999, Rafaël Govaerts transferred it to the genus, Calamagrostis.
