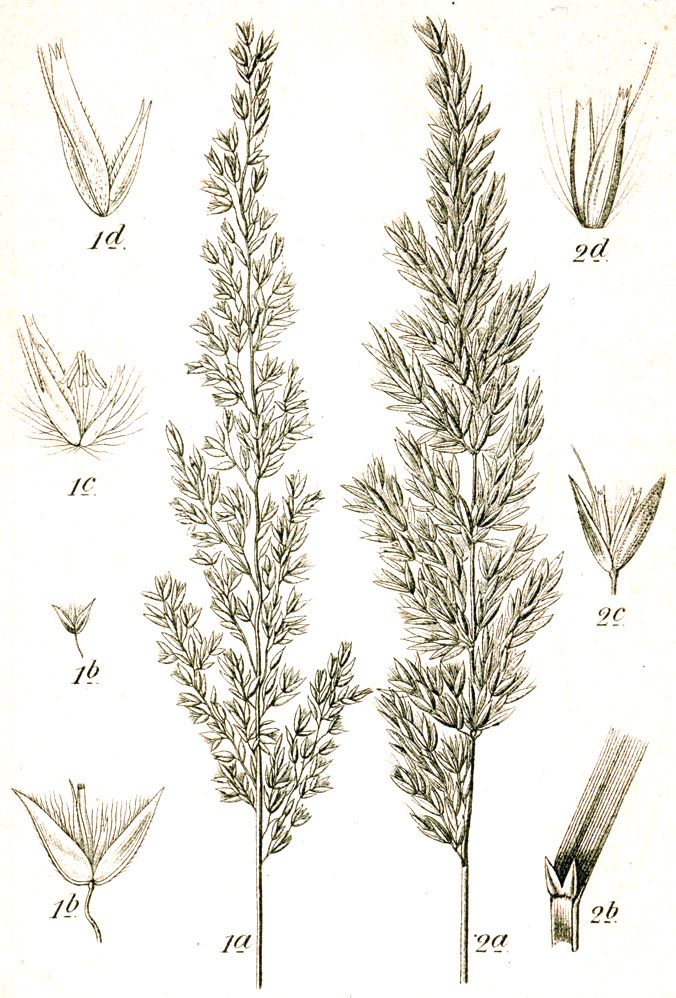

Scientific classification
- Kingdom: Plantae
- Clade: Tracheophytes
- Clade: Angiosperms
- Clade: Monocots
- Clade: Commelinids
- Order: Poales
- Family: Poaceae
- Subfamily: Pooideae
- Genus: Calamagrostis
- Species: C. varia

Binomial name
- Calamagrostis varia (Schrad.) Host

= Calamagrostis varia =

Species of plant

Calamagrostis varia is a species of flowering plant from the family Poaceae which is native to Europe.

== Description ==
The species is perennial and caespitose with short rhizomes and erect culms which are 30–120 centimetres (12–47 in) long. It ligule have an eciliate membrane which is 2–4 millimetres (0.079–0.157 in) long and is also lacerate, and obtuse. The leaf-blades are 10–25 centimetres (3.9–9.8 in) by 4–9 millimetres (0.16–0.35 in) with the bottom being glabrous. The panicle is open, linear, is 5–20 centimetres (2.0–7.9 in) long and have scabrous branches. It fertile spikelets are lanceolate and are 4–6 millimetres (0.16–0.24 in). They carry one fertile floret which have a hairy floret callus which is 0.5–0.75 millimetres (0.020–0.030 in) over lemma.

Fertile lemma is oblong and is of the same size as a spikelet, membranous and keelless. Lemma itself have an asperulous surface and dentate apex with the main lemma having awns which are 0–0.1 millimetres (0.0000–0.0039 in) over the lemma and are geniculated and are 1–3 millimetres (0.039–0.118 in) long. The species also have glumes which are lanceolate, membranous, and are 4–6 millimetres (0.16–0.24 in) long with the upper glume having an acuminate apex. Rhachilla is 1 millimetre (0.039 in) long and pilose. Flowers have two lodicules and two stigmas along with and three stamens which are 1.5 millimetres (0.059 in) long. The fruits are caryopses with additional pericarp.
