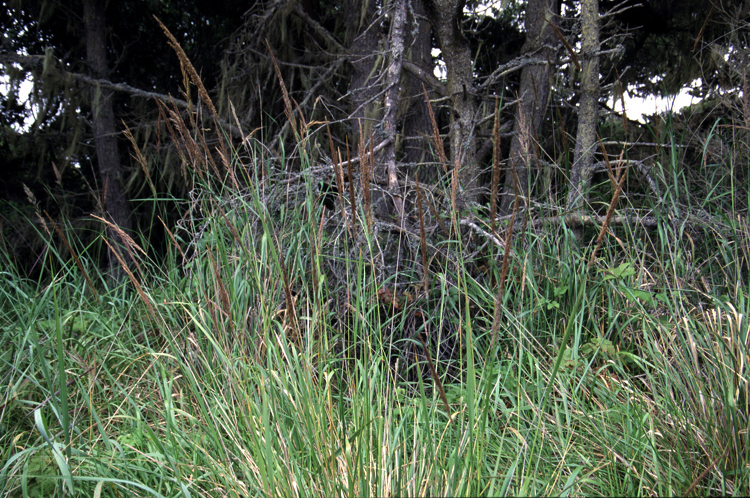

Scientific classification
- Kingdom: Plantae
- Clade: Tracheophytes
- Clade: Angiosperms
- Clade: Monocots
- Clade: Commelinids
- Order: Poales
- Family: Poaceae
- Subfamily: Pooideae
- Genus: Calamagrostis
- Species: C. nutkaensis

Binomial name
- Calamagrostis nutkaensis (J.Presl) J.Presl ex Steud.

Synonyms
- Deyeuxia nutkaensis

= Calamagrostis nutkaensis =

Species of grass

Calamagrostis nutkaensis is a species of grass known by the common names Pacific reedgrass and Nootka reedgrass.

It is native to western North America from Alaska to central California, where it is mainly a coastal species growing in moist areas such as beaches and wetlands. This is a perennial bunchgrass forming thick tufts of stems which may exceed a meter in height. There are several flat grass leaves up to a centimeter wide. The inflorescence is usually narrow and thin.

Coastal roadsides in Mendocino County, California can have populations, often receiving fog drip under Eucalyptus stands.
