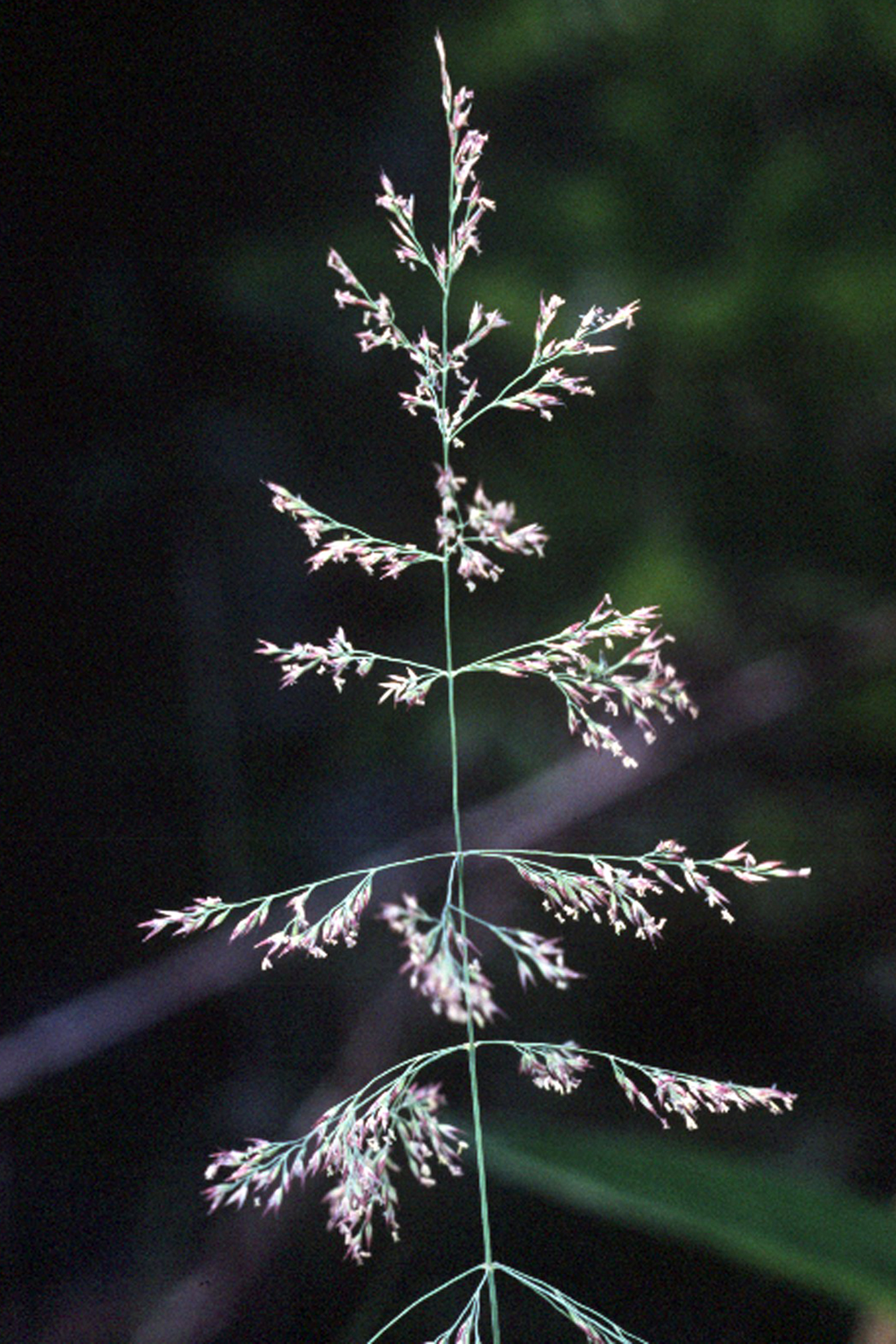

Scientific classification
- Kingdom: Plantae
- Clade: Tracheophytes
- Clade: Angiosperms
- Clade: Monocots
- Clade: Commelinids
- Order: Poales
- Family: Poaceae
- Subfamily: Pooideae
- Genus: Calamagrostis
- Species: C. canadensis

Binomial name
- Calamagrostis canadensis (Michx.) P.Beauv.

Varieties^{List source :}
- C. c. var. langsdorffii (Link) Inman; C. c. var. macouniana (Vasey) Stebbins

Synonyms^{List sources :}
- C. c. var. imberbis (Stebbins) C.L.Hitchc. [ = C. canadensis ]; C. c. var. pallida (Vasey & Scribn.) Stebbins [ = C. canadensis ]; C. c. var. robusta Vasey [ = C. canadensis ]; C. c. var. typica Stebbins [ = C. canadensis ]; C. anomala Suksd. [ = C. canadensis ]; C. atropurpurea Nash [ = C. canadensis ]; C. expansa var. robusta (Vasey) Stebbins [ = C. canadensis ]; C. hyperborea Lange [ = C. canadensis ]; C. inexpansa var. cuprea Kearney [ = C. canadensis ]; C. inexpansa var. robusta (Vasey) Stebbins [ = C. canadensis ]; C. scribneri Beal [ = C. canadensis ]; C. c. subsp. langsdorffii (Link) Hultén [ = var. langsdorffii ]; C. c. var. lactea (Beal) C.L.Hitchc. [ = var. langsdorffii ]; C. c. var. scabra (J.Presl) Hitchc. [ = var. langsdorffii ]; Calamagrostis × lactea Beal (pro sp.) [ = var. langsdorffii ]; C. lactea Beal [ = var. langsdorffii ]; C. langsdorffii (Link) Trin. [ = var. langsdorffii ]; C. nubila Louis-Marie [ = var. langsdorffii ]; C. macouniana (Vasey) Vasey [ = var. macouniana ]; Arundo canadensis Michx. (basionym)

= Calamagrostis canadensis =

Bluejoint

Species of grass

Calamagrostis canadensis is a species of grass, having three or more varieties, in the family Poaceae. It is known variously by the common names of bluejoint, bluejoint reedgrass, marsh reedgrass, Canadian reedgrass, meadow pinegrass, Canada bluejoint and marsh pinegrass.

== Varieties ==
Calamagrostis canadensis takes the form of at least three varieties, including the type. The U.S. Forest Service names others.

- The type variety (and autonym), is C. c. var. canadensis. This is the name for C. canadensis after varieties of it were named and is used only to differentiate it from the other, newer varieties. The common name is bluejoint
- C. c. var. langsdorffii. It is also called bluejoint.
- C. c. var. macouniana. It is known as Macoun's reedgrass. It was named for Canadian Botanist James Melville Macoun.

== Distribution ==
The varieties often overlap in where they are distributed.

=== In the United States ===
Most states in the U.S. have one or more varieties of C. canadensis, the most common by distribution being C. c. var. canadensis. Only Minnesota, New Hampshire, New York, and Vermont have all three; and only one, Kentucky, has C. c. var. macouniana with no others.

15 states have only C. c. var. canadensis, without others (Arizona, Delaware, Idaho, Indiana, Kansas, Maryland, Maine, North Carolina, Nevada, New Mexico, Rhode Island, Tennessee, Utah, West Virginia, and Wyoming); and no state has C. c. var. langsdorffii without sharing territory with C. c. var. canadensis.

14 states have both C. c. var. canadensis and C. c. var. macouniana, without C. c. var. langsdorffii (Connecticut, Iowa, Illinois, Massachusetts, Mississippi, Missouri, North Dakota, Nebraska, New Jersey, Ohio, Pennsylvania, South Dakota, Virginia, and Wisconsin); and only seven have both C. c. var. canadensis and C. c. var. langsdorffii, and no C. c. var. macouniana (Alaska, California, Colorado, Georgia, Montana, Oregon, and Washington)

=== In Canada and elsewhere ===
All three varieties are native to parts of Canada: the provinces of Alberta, Manitoba, Northwest Territories, Ontario, Quebec, Saskatchewan have all three varieties; British Columbia, Labrador, Newfoundland, and Yukon Territory have both C. c. var. canadensis and C. c. var. langsdorffii; New Brunswick, Nova Scotia, and Prince Edward Island have both C. c. var. canadensis and C. c. var. macouniana; and only Nunavut is the home of just one variety, C. c. var. langsdorffii.

Two other places have varieties of C. canandensis, though neither have C. c. var. macouniana: Greenland has C. c. var. langsdorffii; and the French territorial islands of Saint-Pierre and Miquelon have C. c. var. canadensis

== Habitat ==
C. canadensis can be found in many types of habitats, including forest, taiga, and tundra in subarctic regions. It is the most common and widespread Calamagrostis species on the continent.

== Description ==
It is a perennial grass with a branching stem reaching heights between 60 centimeters and 1.5 meters. The flat, drooping leaves are rough with tiny hairs. The inflorescence is up to 25 centimeters long and may be open and loose or narrow and densely packed with spikelets. Each spikelet is about half a centimeter long and purplish in color.

It is a palatable food plant for livestock and wild grazing animals. It is a tough rhizomatous grass that provides soil stability in wet areas and is one of the first plants to reestablish on sites of recent oil spills. It can be a nuisance on sites of forest restoration, because it can outcompete conifer seedlings.
