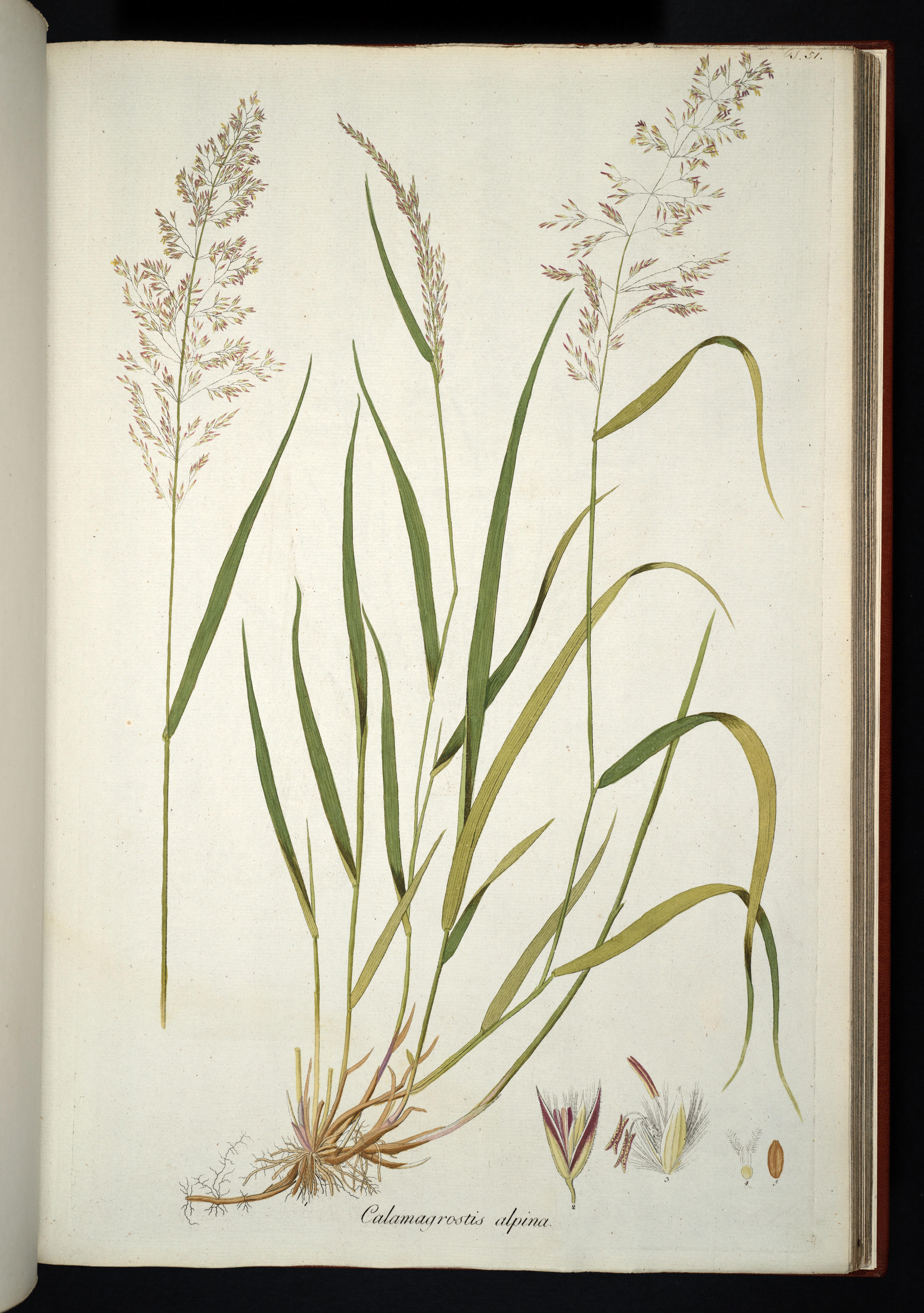

Scientific classification
- Kingdom: Plantae
- Clade: Tracheophytes
- Clade: Angiosperms
- Clade: Monocots
- Clade: Commelinids
- Order: Poales
- Family: Poaceae
- Subfamily: Pooideae
- Genus: Calamagrostis
- Species: C. villosa

Binomial name
- Calamagrostis villosa (Chaix) J.F.Gmel.

= Calamagrostis villosa =

Species of grass

Calamagrostis villosa is a species of flowering plant from the family Poaceae which is native to Europe.

== Description ==
The species is perennial and caespitose with short rhizomes and 50–150 centimetres (20–59 in) long culms. It ligule have an eciliate membrane which is 3–5 millimetres (0.12–0.20 in) long and is also lacerate. The leaf-blades are 3–8 millimetres (0.12–0.31 in) wide with the bottom being scabrous and pilose. The panicle is open, inflorescenced, and linear. It is also 8–20 centimetres (3.1–7.9 in) long and 3–6 centimetres (1.2–2.4 in) wide with the branches being scaberulous. Spikelets are cuneate and are 4–6 millimetres (0.16–0.24 in). They carry one fertile floret which have a bearded floret callus.

Fertile lemma is keelless, membranous, oblong and is 2.5–3.5 millimetres (0.098–0.138 in) long. Lemma itself have a dentate apex with the main lemma having awns which are 0.5–0.6 millimetres (0.020–0.024 in) over the lemma and are sized 1–2 millimetres (0.039–0.079 in). The species also have glumes which are lanceolate, membranous, and have acuminate apexes with the upper glume being of the same size as a spikelet. Rhachilla is 0.5 millimetres (0.020 in) long and pilose. Flowers have two lodicules and two stigmas along with and three stamens. The fruits are caryopses with additional pericarp and punctiform hilum.
