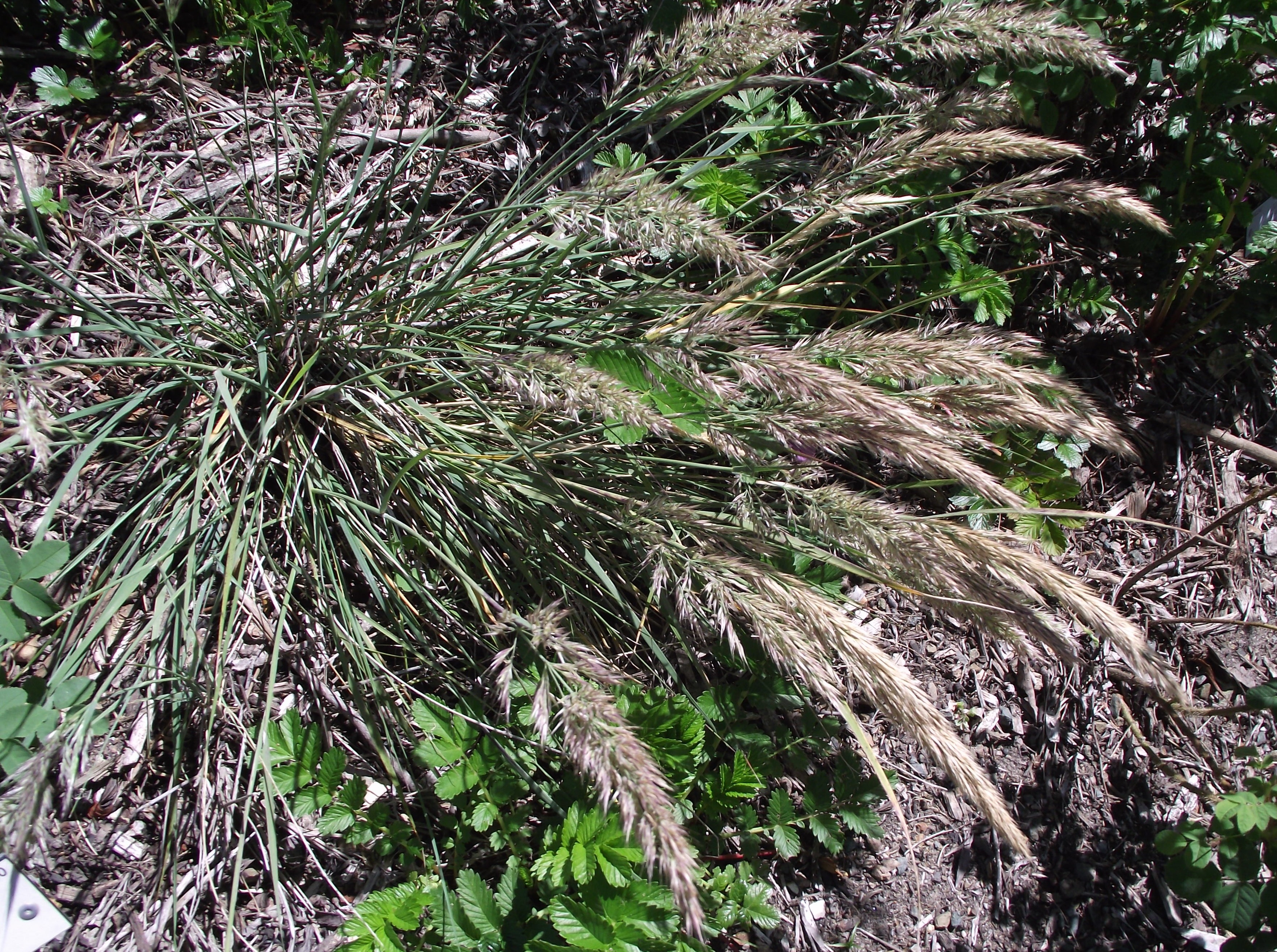

Conservation status
- Vulnerable (NatureServe)

Scientific classification
- Kingdom: Plantae
- Clade: Tracheophytes
- Clade: Angiosperms
- Clade: Monocots
- Clade: Commelinids
- Order: Poales
- Family: Poaceae
- Subfamily: Pooideae
- Genus: Calamagrostis
- Species: C. foliosa

Binomial name
- Calamagrostis foliosa Kearney

= Calamagrostis foliosa =

Species of grass

Calamagrostis foliosa is a species of grass known by the common name Cape Mendocino reed grass or leafy reed grass. It is endemic to the Lost Coast in northern California, where it grows in the forests and scrub on the coastline.

== Description ==
Calamagrostis foliosa is perennial bunchgrass, producing a tuft of stems 30 to 60 centimeters tall. The leaves are mostly located about the base of the stems.

The inflorescence is a dense, narrow sheaf of spikelets up to 12 centimeters long. The fruit of each spikelet is tipped with a bent awn.
