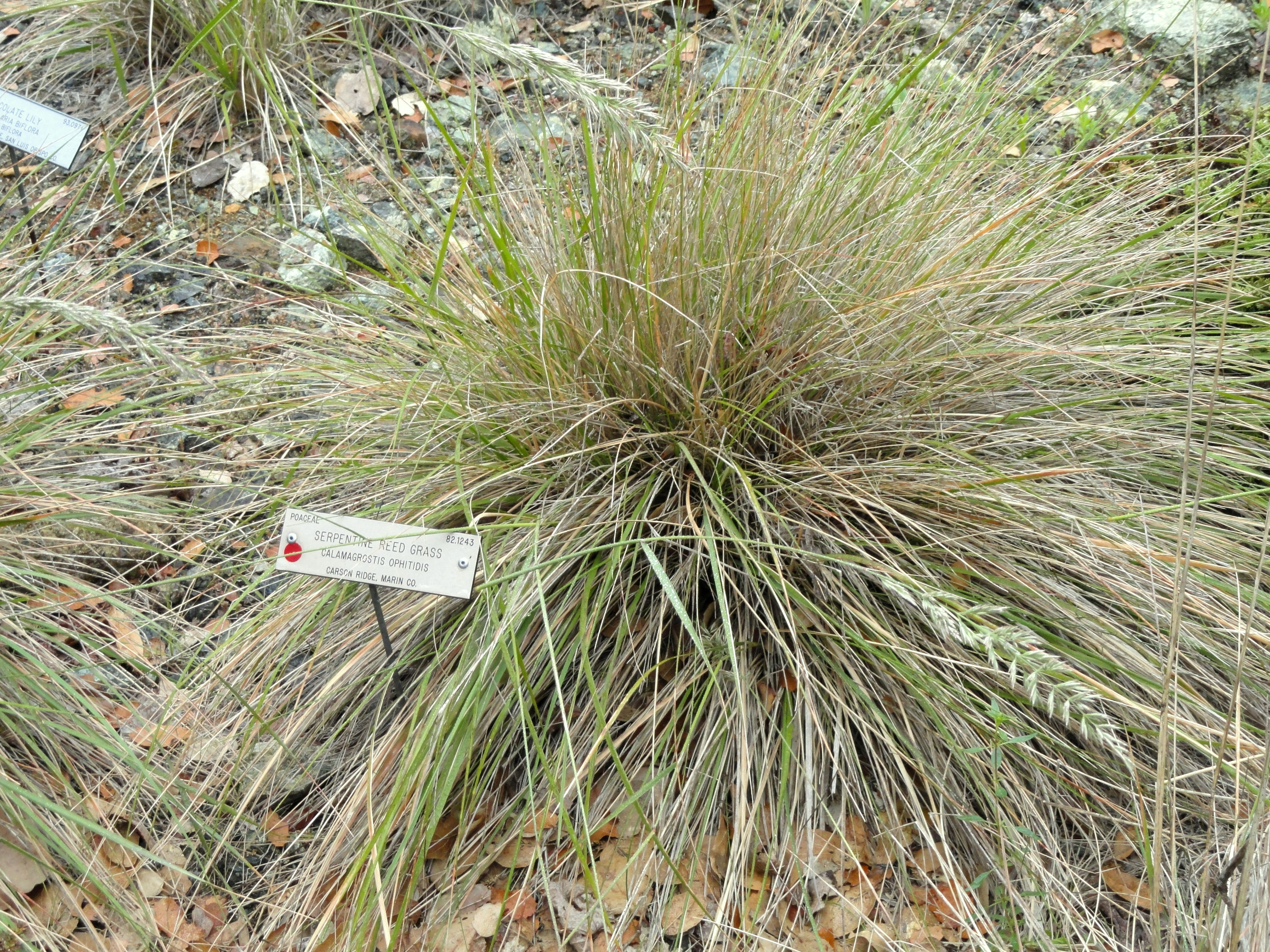

Conservation status
- Vulnerable (NatureServe)

Scientific classification
- Kingdom: Plantae
- Clade: Tracheophytes
- Clade: Angiosperms
- Clade: Monocots
- Clade: Commelinids
- Order: Poales
- Family: Poaceae
- Subfamily: Pooideae
- Genus: Calamagrostis
- Species: C. ophitidis

Binomial name
- Calamagrostis ophitidis (J.T.Howell) Nygren

= Calamagrostis ophitidis =

Species of flowering plant

Calamagrostis ophitidis, the serpentine reedgrass, is a species of bunch grass in the family Poaceae.

It is endemic to California, where it grows in the serpentine soils of the mountain slopes north of the San Francisco Bay Area.

== Description ==
It is a perennial grass forming clumps reaching heights between 60 centimeters and three feet/one meter. The inflorescence is a dense, thinly bushy array of rough, pale-colored spikelets.
