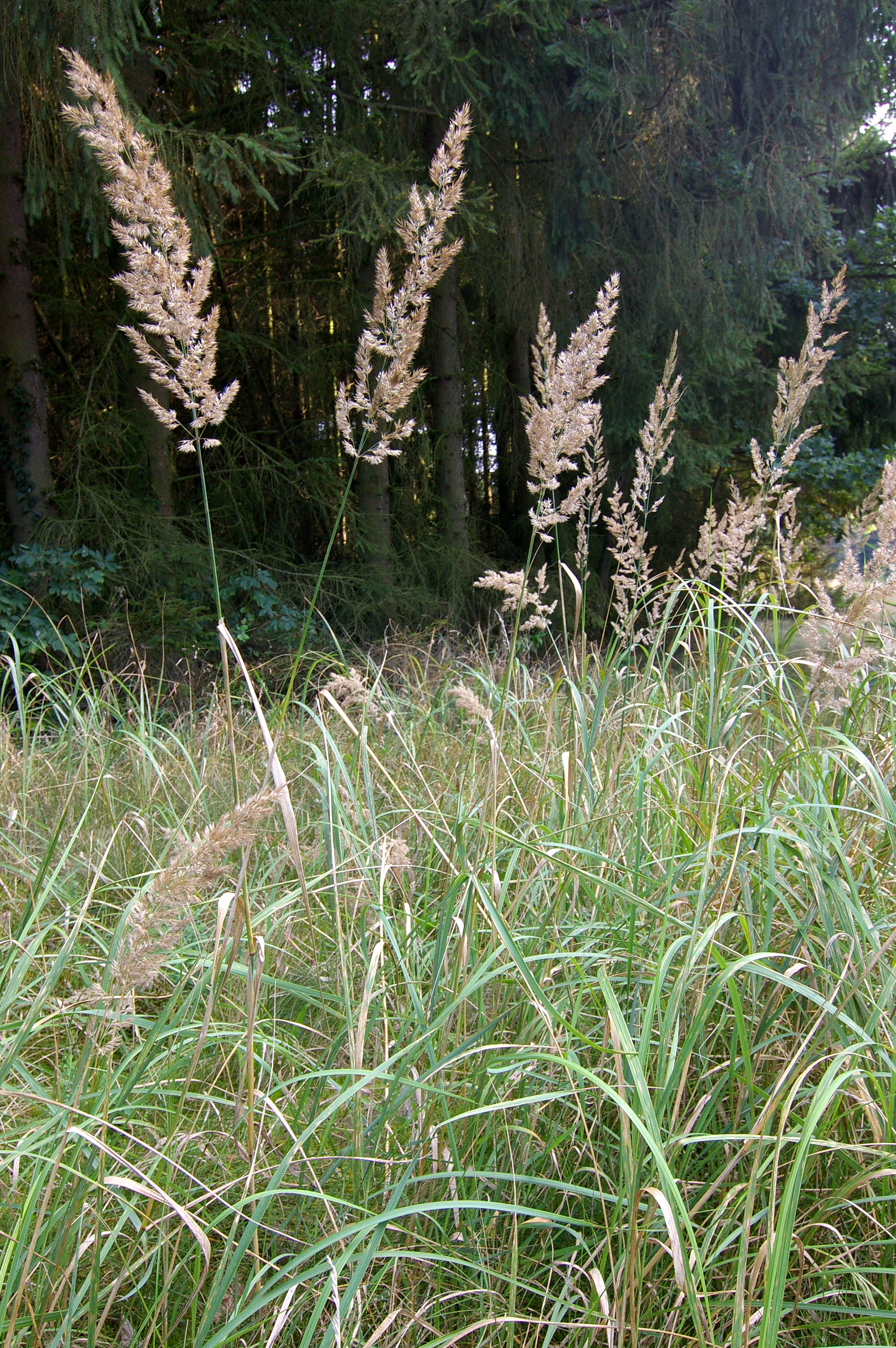

Scientific classification
- Kingdom: Plantae
- Clade: Tracheophytes
- Clade: Angiosperms
- Clade: Monocots
- Clade: Commelinids
- Order: Poales
- Family: Poaceae
- Subfamily: Pooideae
- Genus: Calamagrostis
- Species: C. epigejos

Binomial name
- Calamagrostis epigejos (L.) Roth

Synonyms
- Arundo epigeios L.; Calamagrostis arenicola; Calamagrostis meinshausenii (Tzvelev) Vilyasoo

= Calamagrostis epigejos =

Species of grass

Calamagrostis epigejos, common names wood small-reed or bushgrass, is a species of grass in the family Poaceae which is native to Eurasia and Africa. It is found from average moisture locales to salt marsh and wet habitats.

== Description ==
The foliage is a medium green and is perennial with lengthy rhizomes. The culms are erect and are 60–200 centimetres (24–79 in) long while the leaf-blades are 70 centimetres (28 in) long and 3–14 millimetres (0.12–0.55 in) (in some cases even 20 millimetres or 0.8 inches) wide. Its ligule is 4–12 millimetres (0.16–0.47 in) long and is acute and lacerate. The species also have an erect panicle which is 15–30 centimetres (5.9–11.8 in) long and is also oblong and almost lanceolate. The spikelets are 4.5–7 millimetres (0.18–0.28 in) long while the rhachilla is prolonged. The glumes are scaberulous and lanceolate while the lemma is only a half of its length. Its awns are 1–2.5 millimetres (0.04–0.10 in) and are located closer to the lemmas middle.

The large inflorescence is a rich brown colour. The flowers form dense and narrow spikes 25–35 centimetres (10–14 in) long.

== Distribution ==
Calamagrostis epigejos has a broad distribution in temperate Eurasia, from France and Great Britain to Japan. A distinct variety is found in southern and eastern Africa.

== Cultivation ==
Calamagrostis epigejos is cultivated as an ornamental grass for gardens.
