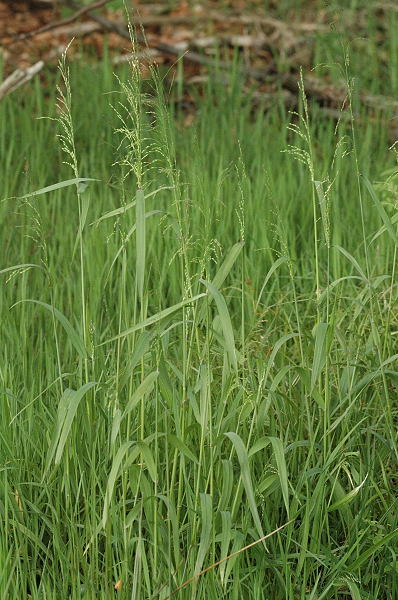

Scientific classification
- Kingdom: Plantae
- Clade: Tracheophytes
- Clade: Angiosperms
- Clade: Monocots
- Clade: Commelinids
- Order: Poales
- Family: Poaceae
- Subfamily: Pooideae
- Genus: Milium
- Species: M. effusum

Binomial name
- Milium effusum L.

Synonyms
- List: Agrostis effusa Lam.; Alopecurus effusus Link ex Kunth nom. inval.; Decandolia effusa (Lam.) T.Bastard; Melica effusa (L.) Salisb.; Miliarium effusum (L.) Moench; Milium adscendens Roxb. nom. inval.; Milium confertum L.; Milium dubium Jacquem. ex Hook.f. nom. inval.; Milium nepalense Nees nom. inval.; Milium transsilvanicum Schur; Milium willdenowii Lojac.; Paspalum effusum (L.) Raspail

= Milium effusum =

Species of flowering plant

Milium effusum, the American milletgrass or wood millet, is a species of flowering plant in the grass family Poaceae, native to damp forests of the Holarctic Kingdom.

The Latin specific epithet effusum means "spreading loosely".

== Description ==
M. effusum is a shortly rhizomatous, nemoral-mesic grass with an open panicle. The spikelets are about 2.5-5mm long, pedicellate, with no awn on the glume(s) or lemma, and only one fertile floret. The leaves are approximately 5-17mm wide and hairless. The ligule is roughly 3-10mm and membranous. The plant is rare in its southernmost range, as a secure species only in Ontario, Novia Scotia, and New Brunswick, ranging in vulnerability outside of its secure area in its natural range.

== Habitat ==
Milium effusum inhabits damp, deciduous woods and shaded banks, where it grows on winter-wet, calcareous to mildly acidic clay and loam soils, and also over rocks in western Scotland.

== Distribution ==
It can be found in the northern United States and Canada, and Europe, including Britain but excluding the Mediterranean, east to Siberia and the Himalayas.

== Cultivation ==
The yellow-leaved cultivar 'Aureum', known as Bowles' golden grass, is cultivated as an ornamental garden plant, and in the UK has won the Royal Horticultural Society's Award of Garden Merit.

== Gallery ==
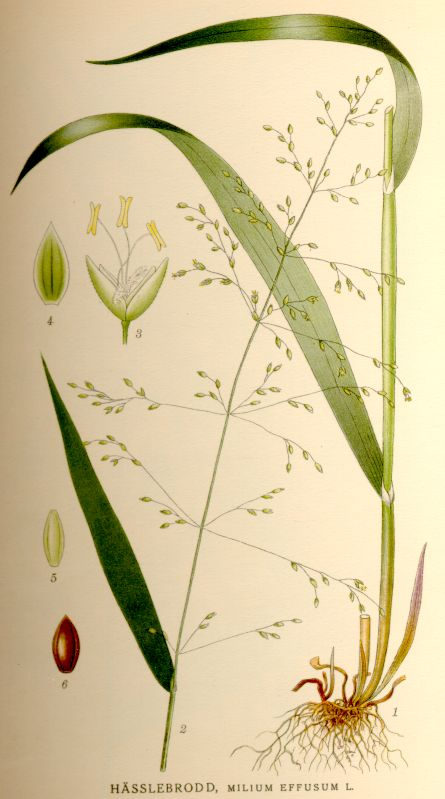

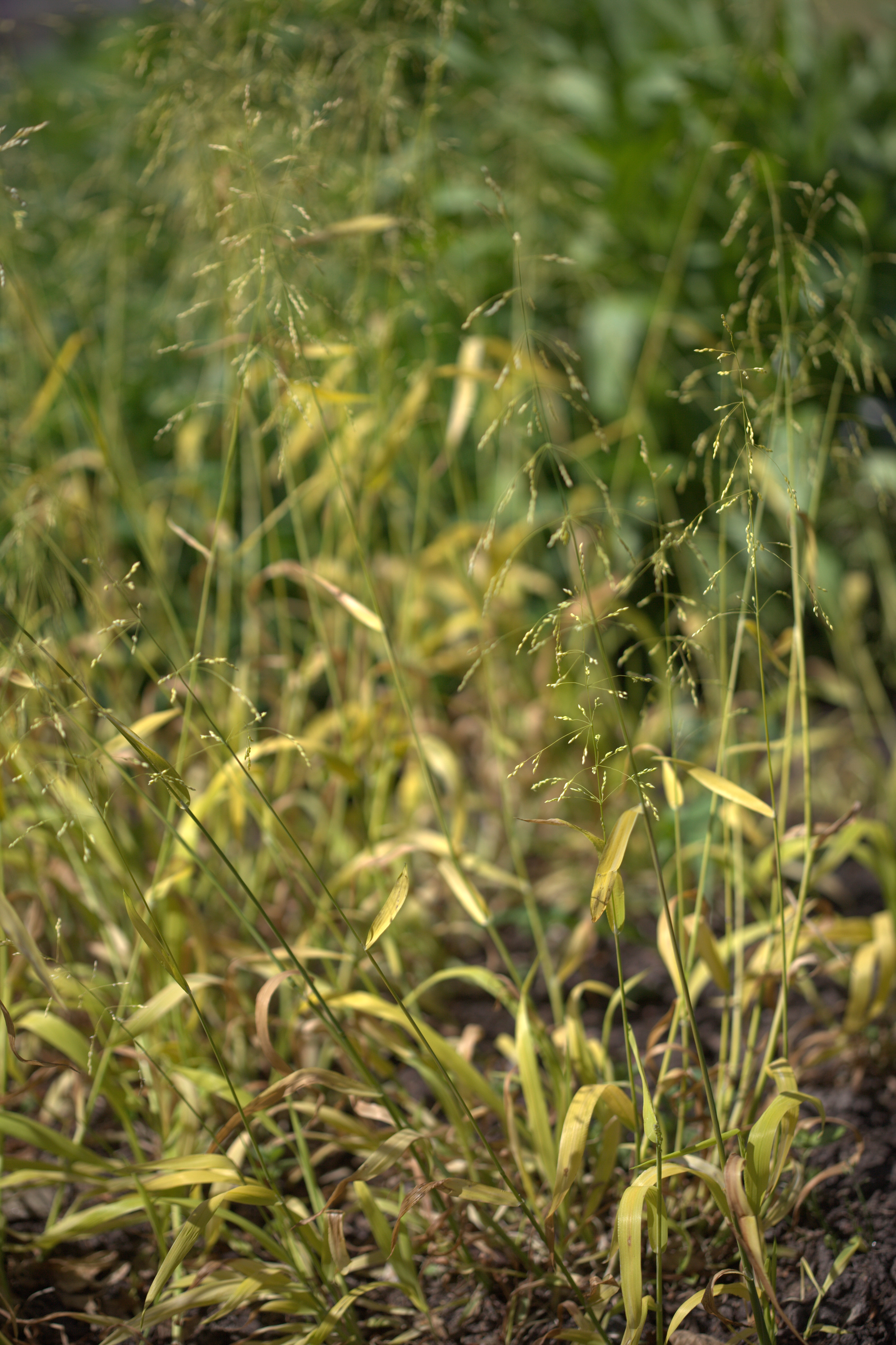

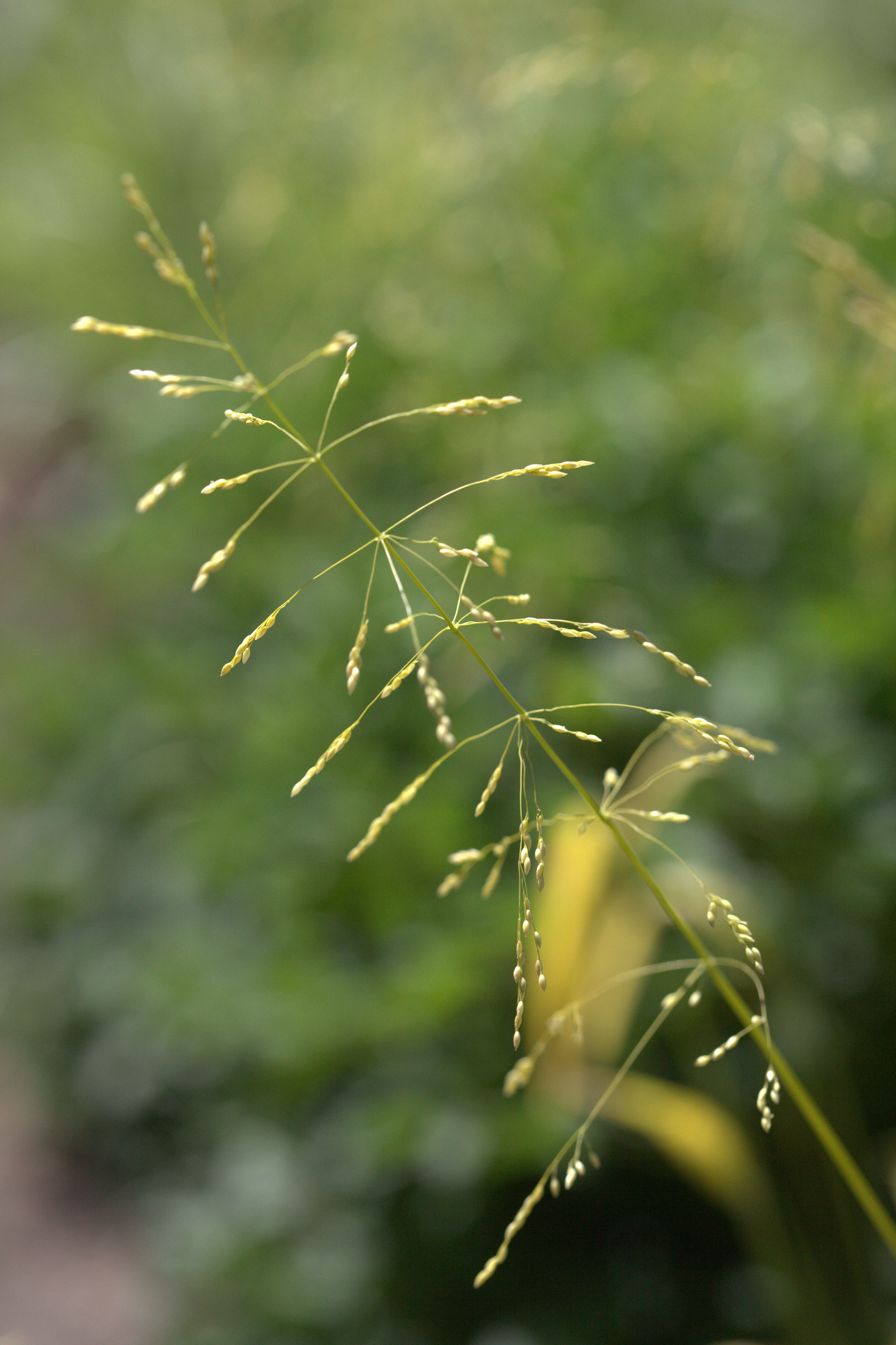
