= George Thurber =

George Thurber (Providence, Rhode Island, September 2, 1821 – Passaic, New Jersey, April 2, 1890) was a United States naturalist and writer. He had a special interest in grasses of the United States.

== Biography ==
He was mainly self-educated, though he did spend time at the Union Classical and Engineering School at Providence. He became a pharmacist, and lectured on chemistry at the Franklin Society in Providence. In 1850, he secured an appointment as botanist, quartermaster and commissary on a survey of the boundary between the United States and Mexico. He made an important collection of plants, and on his return to Providence was given the degree of A.M. by Brown University. He secured an appointment in the Assay Office in New York, lectured on botany in Cooper Institute and on botany and materia medica in the New York College of Pharmacy. Later he occupied the chair of botany and horticulture in the Michigan College of Agriculture but returned again to New York and to lecture at the College of Pharmacy and in 1863 became editor of the American Agriculturist, where he worked for 24 years. In 1880 he visited Europe.

He was life member of the Royal Horticultural Society, life member of the American Pomological Society, an active member of the New York Academy of Sciences and corresponding member of the Philadelphia Academy. From 1873 to 1880, he was the Torrey Botanical Club's president. His collection of plants from the western United States is in the Gray Herbarium at Harvard University.

== Awards and honors ==
Thurber was awarded an honorary degree from Brown University in 1865.

The standard author abbreviation Thurb. is used to indicate this person as the author when citing a botanical name.
