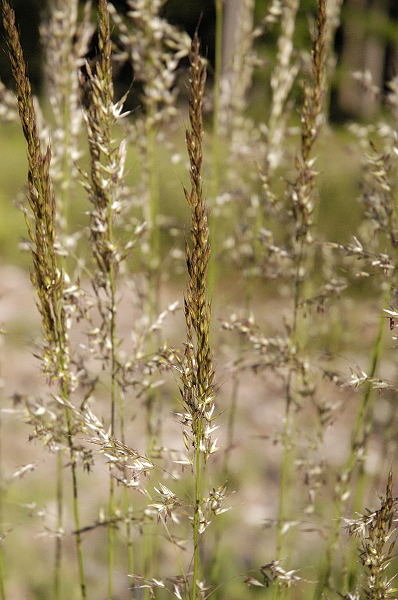

Scientific classification
- Kingdom: Plantae
- Clade: Tracheophytes
- Clade: Angiosperms
- Clade: Monocots
- Clade: Commelinids
- Order: Poales
- Family: Poaceae
- Subfamily: Pooideae
- Genus: Calamagrostis
- Species: C. arundinacea

Binomial name
- Calamagrostis arundinacea (L.) Roth

Synonyms
- List: Agrostis arundinacea L.; Agrostis pseudoarundinacea Schleich. ex Gaudin; Arundo agrostis Scop.; Arundo clarionis Loisel.; Arundo montana Gaudin; Arundo sylvatica Schrad.; Athernotus pyramidalis (Host) Dulac; Calamagrostis abietina Schur; Calamagrostis adpressiramea Ohwi; Calamagrostis arundinacea subsp. adpressiramea (Ohwi) T.Koyama; Calamagrostis arundinacea var. alpina (Schur) Serb. & Beldie; Calamagrostis arundinacea var. austrojeholensis (Honda) Kitag.; Calamagrostis arundinacea var. ciliata Honda; Calamagrostis arundinacea subsp. distantiflora (Luchnik) Tzvelev; Calamagrostis arundinacea subsp. heterogluma (Nakai) T.Koyama; Calamagrostis arundinacea subsp. hymenoglossa (Ohwi) T.Koyama; Calamagrostis arundinacea var. inaequata Honda; Calamagrostis arundinacea var. ligulata (Rendle) Kitag.; Calamagrostis arundinacea var. macrotricha Litv.; Calamagrostis arundinacea subsp. monticola (Petrov ex Kom.) Tzvelev; Calamagrostis arundinacea var. robusta Raclaru; Calamagrostis arundinacea subsp. sugawarae (Ohwi) Tzvelev; Calamagrostis arundinacea f. turfosa (Schur) Soó; Calamagrostis austrojeholensis Honda; Calamagrostis brachytricha Steud.; Calamagrostis brachytricha var. ciliata (Honda) Ibaragi & H.Ohashi; Calamagrostis chassanensis Prob.; Calamagrostis clarionis (Loisel.) Loisel.; Calamagrostis collina Franch.; Calamagrostis formosana Hayata; Calamagrostis henryi (Rendle) P.C.Kuo & S.L.Lu ex J.L.Yang; Calamagrostis heterogluma (Nakai) Honda; Calamagrostis hsinganensis (Kitag.) Kitag.; Calamagrostis hupehensis (Rendle) Chase; Calamagrostis hymenoglossa Ohwi; Calamagrostis korotkyi subsp. monticola (Petrov ex Kom.) Vorosch.; Calamagrostis licentiana Hand.-Mazz.; Calamagrostis matsudana Honda; Calamagrostis montana DC.; Calamagrostis monticola Petrov ex Kom.; Calamagrostis morrisonensis Hayata; Calamagrostis nipponica Franch. & Sav.; Calamagrostis parviflora Rupr.; Calamagrostis pyramidalis Host; Calamagrostis rariflora Schur; Calamagrostis robusta Franch. & Sav.; Calamagrostis sciuroides Franch. & Sav.; Calamagrostis subalpina Schur; Calamagrostis sublanceolata Honda; Calamagrostis sugawarae Ohwi; Cinna agrostoidea P.Beauv.; Deyeuxia abietina (Schur) Fuss; Deyeuxia ampla Keng; Deyeuxia arundinacea (L.) Jansen; Deyeuxia arundinacea var. borealis (Rendle) P.C.Kuo & S.L.Lu; Deyeuxia arundinacea var. brachytricha (Steud.) P.C.Kuo & S.L.Lu; Deyeuxia arundinacea var. ciliata (Honda) P.C.Kuo & S.L.Lu; Deyeuxia arundinacea var. collina (Franch.) P.C.Kuo & S.L.Lu; Deyeuxia arundinacea var. hirsuta (Hack.) P.C.Kuo & S.L.Lu; Deyeuxia arundinacea var. latifolia (Rendle) P.C.Kuo & S.L.Lu; Deyeuxia arundinacea var. ligulata (Rendle) P.C.Kuo & S.L.Lu; Deyeuxia arundinacea var. robusta (Honda) P.C.Kuo & S.L.Lu; Deyeuxia arundinacea var. sciuroides (Franch. & Sav.) P.C.Kuo & S.L.Lu; Deyeuxia brachytricha (Steud.) D.M.Chang; Deyeuxia formosana (Hayata) C.C.Hsu; Deyeuxia henryi Rendle; Deyeuxia hupehensis Rendle; Deyeuxia matsudana (Honda) Keng; Deyeuxia montana P.Beauv.; Deyeuxia multiflora P.Beauv. ex Nyman; Deyeuxia pyramidalis (Host) Veldkamp; Deyeuxia pyramidalis var. borealis (Rendle) Q.X.Liu; Deyeuxia pyramidalis var. ciliata (Honda) Q.X.Liu; Deyeuxia pyramidalis var. ligulata (Rendle) Q.X.Liu; Deyeuxia pyramidalis var. robusta Q.X.Liu; Deyeuxia rariflora (Schur) Fuss; Deyeuxia sciuroides (Franch. & Sav.) Keng; Deyeuxia subalpina Schur; Deyeuxia sylvatica Kunth; Deyeuxia sylvatica var. borealis Rendle; Deyeuxia sylvatica var. ciliata (Honda) Keng; Deyeuxia sylvatica var. ligulata Rendle; Donax montanus P.Beauv.

= Calamagrostis arundinacea =

Species of grass

Calamagrostis arundinacea is a species of bunch grass in the family Poaceae, native to Eurasia, China and India. Under its synonym Calamagrostis brachytricha it has gained the Royal Horticultural Society's Award of Garden Merit.

== Description ==
The species is perennial and tufted with short rhizomes and erect culms that are 60–150 centimetres (24–59 in) long. Each leaf has a truncate ligule which is 2–4 millimetres (0.08–0.16 in) long, and obtuse. The leaf-blades are 8–50 mm (0.3–2.0 in) by 1.8–10 mm (0.07–0.39 in), hairless and have both a scabrous surface and an attenuate apex. The panicle has a scaberulous peduncle and is lanceolate, open, continuous, and is 8–18 cm (3.1–7.1 in) long by 1–4 cm (0.4–1.6 in) wide. Flowers have a pair of lodicules and stigmas, and three anthers which are 2.4–2.7 mm (0.09–0.11 in) long. The fruit is a caryopsis with an additional pericarp.
