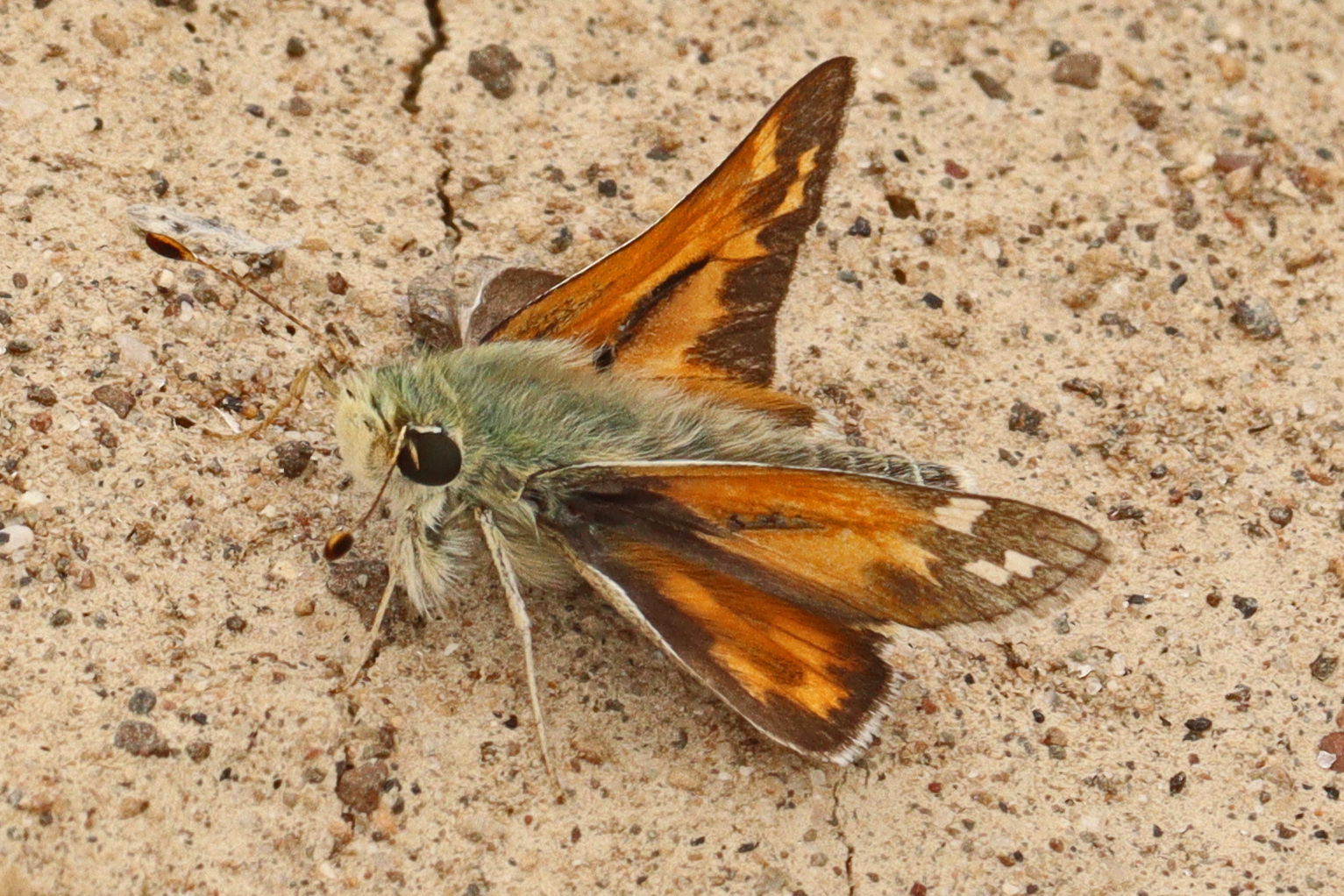

Conservation status
- Secure (NatureServe)

Scientific classification
- Kingdom: Animalia
- Phylum: Arthropoda
- Clade: Pancrustacea
- Class: Insecta
- Order: Lepidoptera
- Family: Hesperiidae
- Genus: Hesperia
- Species: H. juba

Binomial name
- Hesperia juba (Scudder, 1872)

Synonyms
- Pamphila juba Scudder, 1872; Hesperia nevada Garth, 1934

= Hesperia juba =

Species of butterfly

Hesperia juba, the Juba skipper, Yuba skipper, or jagged-border skipper, is a butterfly of the family Hesperiidae. It is found in North America from British Columbia, south to southern California, east to Montana, Wyoming, Colorado, and north-western New Mexico.

The wingspan is 32–42 mm. There are two generations per year with adults on wing from April to June and again from August to October.

The larvae feed on Deschampsia elongata, Stipa, Bromus rubens, and Poa pratensis. Adults feed on flower nectar from various flowers, including rabbitbrush.

The Hesperia juba is known for having heavier, more noticeable white markings compared to other types of Hesperia species. It is also known for its unique perching behavior. Hesperia juba males attract females by perching on the ground or on low vegetation in gullies. This is unique to Hesperia juba, as others in the Hesperia genus prefer perching on hilltops or high ridges.

== Description ==
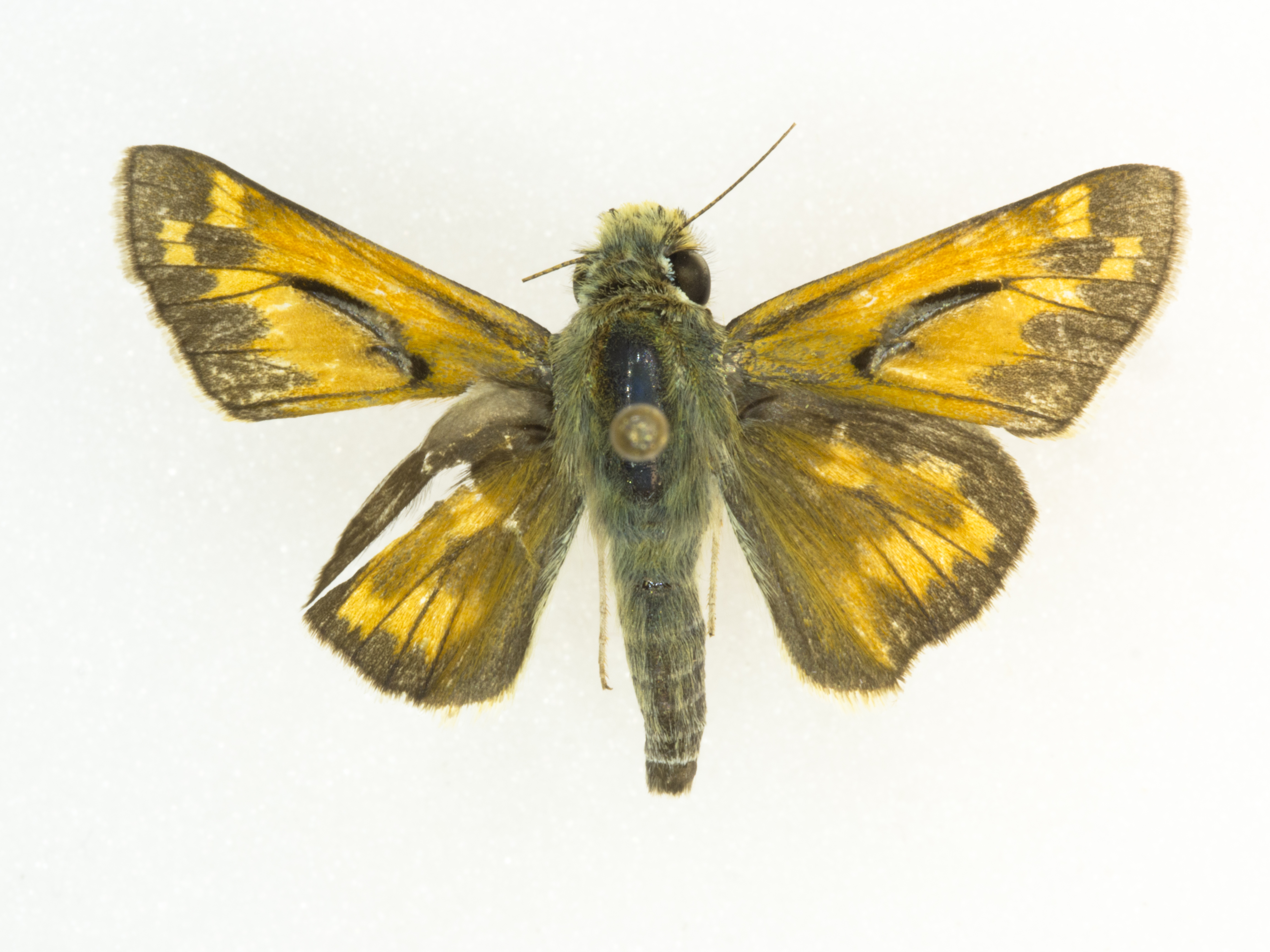
An image of a male H. juba butterfly.

Hesperiidae, or skipper butterflies, typically have large, stout bodies that are disproportionately larger than their wings. These types of butterflies also have hooked antenna tips, as opposed to the clubbed tips that are more common in other butterfly types. Hesperia juba butterflies have similarly large, moth-like bodies with hooked antennae and greenish-brown hindwings.

Juba skippers are distinct from other skipper butterflies due to their larger thoraxes with intense blue-green hairs and the presence of distinct white spotting on their underwings. Male Juba skippers typically have bright orange-brown upperwings with toothed borders, while females have larger upperwings with more striking orange and yellow markings.

The larvae of H. juba vary by instar. At the first instar, hatchlings are a cream white color with black head capsules. They later develop into a greenish color after feeding on grass. At the second instar, the caterpillars maintain the creamy white color, but with some small dark spots dotted around their bodies. At later, more mature instars, the caterpillars have plain green-brown colors, but maintain their dark head capsules.

== Geographic range ==
The juba skipper's range spans North America, with northern limits in British Columbia, Canada and southern limits in northern Arizona and northwestern New Mexico. It is most common in the United States, with distributions in Arizona, southern California, Colorado, Idaho, Montana, North Dakota, New Mexico, Nevada, Oregon, South Dakota, Utah, Washington, and Wyoming.

H. juba is a strong flying montane butterfly and has been observed in a wide range of elevations. It has been observed at up to 3292 m elevations in Rocky mountain states and at least 2743 m in north California. It has also been reported in ranges from 21 m to 2896 m in Oregon. It is also most commonly seen in the Cascades, but rarely in the north Coast Range, which suggests that butterflies in this area are temporary colonists.

== Habitat ==
H. juba prefers arid and semi-arid environments, including sagebrush steppe, arid brushland, dunes, grassy hillsides, and pine-juniper woodlands. They typically thrive in areas with bunchgrasses, as these are their primary host plants. Specific types of caterpillar hosts include the slender hairgrass (Deschampsia elongata), needlegrass (Stipa), foxtail brome (Bromus rubens), and bluegrass (Poa pratensis).

== Food resources ==
H. juba larvae feed on different types of grasses. Specific types of grasses include those in the following families: Bromus, Deschampsia, Koeleria, Poa, and Stipa. Adult butterflies, however, feed on flower nectar and mud. Some flower species include those in the following families: Allium, Balsamorhiza, Barbarea, Centaurea, Chrysothamnus, Erigeron, Eriogonum, Erysimum, Habrouria, Heterotheca, Liatris, Medicago, Physocarpus, Senecio, Symphyotrichum, and Syringa.

== Phenology ==
Juba skippers have bivoltine phenologies, exhibiting two distinct flights: one in the spring and one in the autumn. In the spring, from late April through mid-June, adult butterflies typically emerge from the Rocky Mountain states after snowmelt. Through July, these butterflies are typically seen at high elevations in the Cascades. The second flight is typically in autumn, from August to October, in which butterflies can be observed across Oregon, Washington, and British Columbia.

== Reproductive characteristics ==
Female butterflies typically lay their eggs on or near dead host plants. Summer-laid eggs typically hatch in about 7-14 days, but may diapause if laid late in the season. In this case, these eggs will hatch in the following spring. From there, larvae typically develop to L2 instar after 7 days and to L5 instar in 35 days, but this is highly dependent on the temperature. This L5 instar stage is the final stage before pupation. For spring-laid eggs, larvae typically develop to L5 instar after 37 days, from which larvae undergo summer dormancy for 31 days before pupation in silk cocoons. These larvae may also grow to L6 instar before pupation. The L6 instar is an extra instar that is specifically for winter survival. In either case, adults will then emerge from their cocoons in 15-16 days.

== Social behavior ==
H. juba are highly territorial and solitary insects. Therefore, their social behaviors are limited to locating and securing mates. Male butterflies typically wait for females by perching on the ground or in gullies. With this, males become highly active and aggressive when other insects or butterflies encroach upon their perching spots. Females also exhibit solitary behaviors. They typically lay their eggs singly on host plants.

== Predators ==
H. juba butterflies have predators at every stage of their lives, which range from other insects to birds and mammals. Eggs are typically preyed upon by other insects, such as beetles, lacewings, and mites. Similarly, larvae typically face threats from wasps, ants, and spiders. Predators of pupae also include other insects, like spiders, but also include shrews and mice. Lastly, adult butterflies are preyed upon by various insect-eating birds, as well as frogs and large predatory insects, like mantids.

== Conservation ==
H. juba butterflies are common and widespread across North America. Because of this, their populations are relatively stable and have been assigned an N5 (secure) conservation status in the United States.
