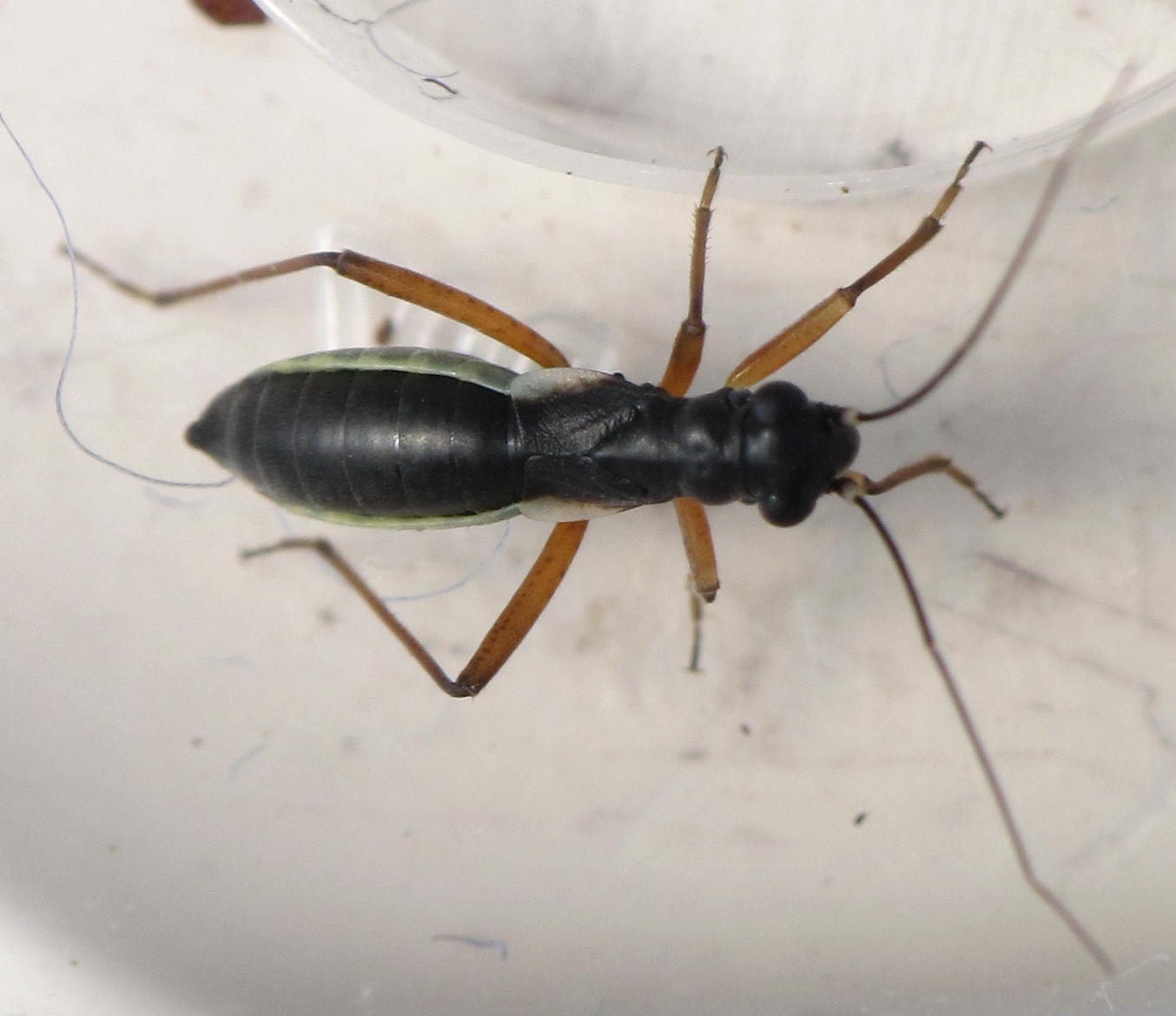
- Specimen from Brión, Galiza, Spain.

Scientific classification
- Kingdom: Animalia
- Phylum: Arthropoda
- Clade: Pancrustacea
- Class: Insecta
- Order: Hemiptera
- Suborder: Heteroptera
- Family: Miridae
- Genus: Pithanus
- Species: P. maerkelii

Binomial name
- Pithanus maerkelii (Herrich-Schaeffer, 1838)

Synonyms
- Capsus maerkelii Herrich-Schaeffer, 1838

= Pithanus maerkelii =

Species of true bug

Pithanus maerkelii is a species of plant bug that belongs to the family Miridae. The species is native to Europe and northern Asia and has been introduced to North America.

== Distribution ==
This species is found in Europe occurring in the Mediterranean basin but only on the western northern edge. To the east this species can be found across the Palearctic to European Russia and Ukraine. The species was introduced to North America being found in the United States and Canada. Their introduction to North America means that this species now has a holarctic distribution.

They inhabit grasses and sedges located in meadows and low-lying areas. They are seen often be found on the ground but can occasionally be on plants, sometimes in association with Mimoceps insignis.

== Description ==
This species can grow to 4-5 mm in length and has a rather ant-like appearance being similar to the silky ant (Formica fusca) found in Europe. It tends to have small, rudimentary wings although fully winged females do occur infrequently.

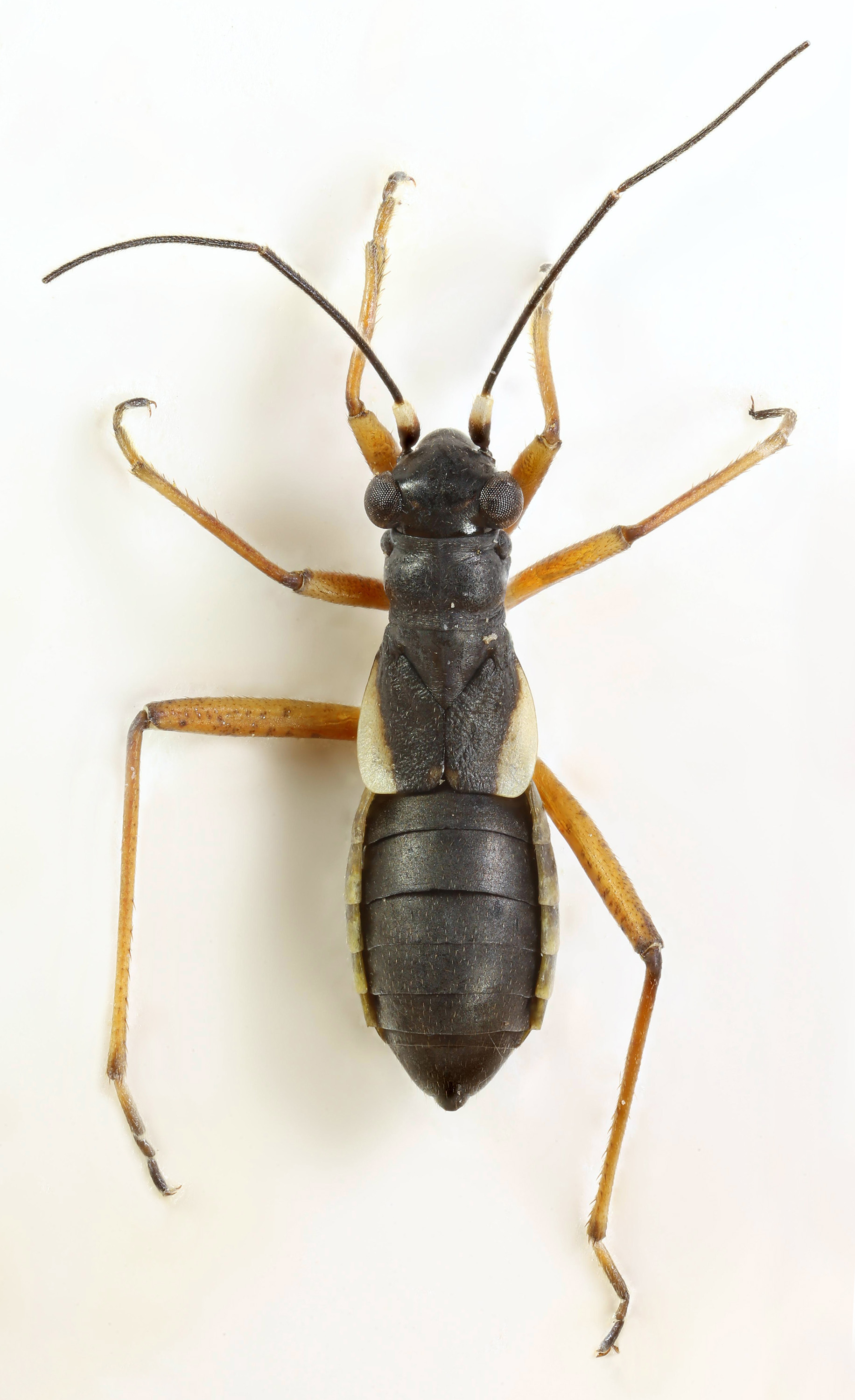
Specimen located in Trawscoed, North Wales.

== Ecology ==
They feed by sucking on their host plants stalks (knots) and ears (ovules). Pithanus maerkelii can be found feeding on species of Poaceae, Cyperaceae and Juncaceae (Agrostis, Festuca, Nardus, Deschampsia, Carex, Scirpus, Juncus).

It is suspected that Pithanus maerkelii might be a mimicry species mimicking the silky ant (Formica fusca), although it's behavior have not been recorded.
