= D. robusta =

D. robusta may refer to:

- Daubentonia robusta, the giant aye-aye, an extinct mammal species that lived in Madagascar
- Derris robusta, a tree species found in India
- Deschampsia robusta, a grass species found on Gough Island
- Drosophila robusta, a fly species

== See also ==
- Robusta
