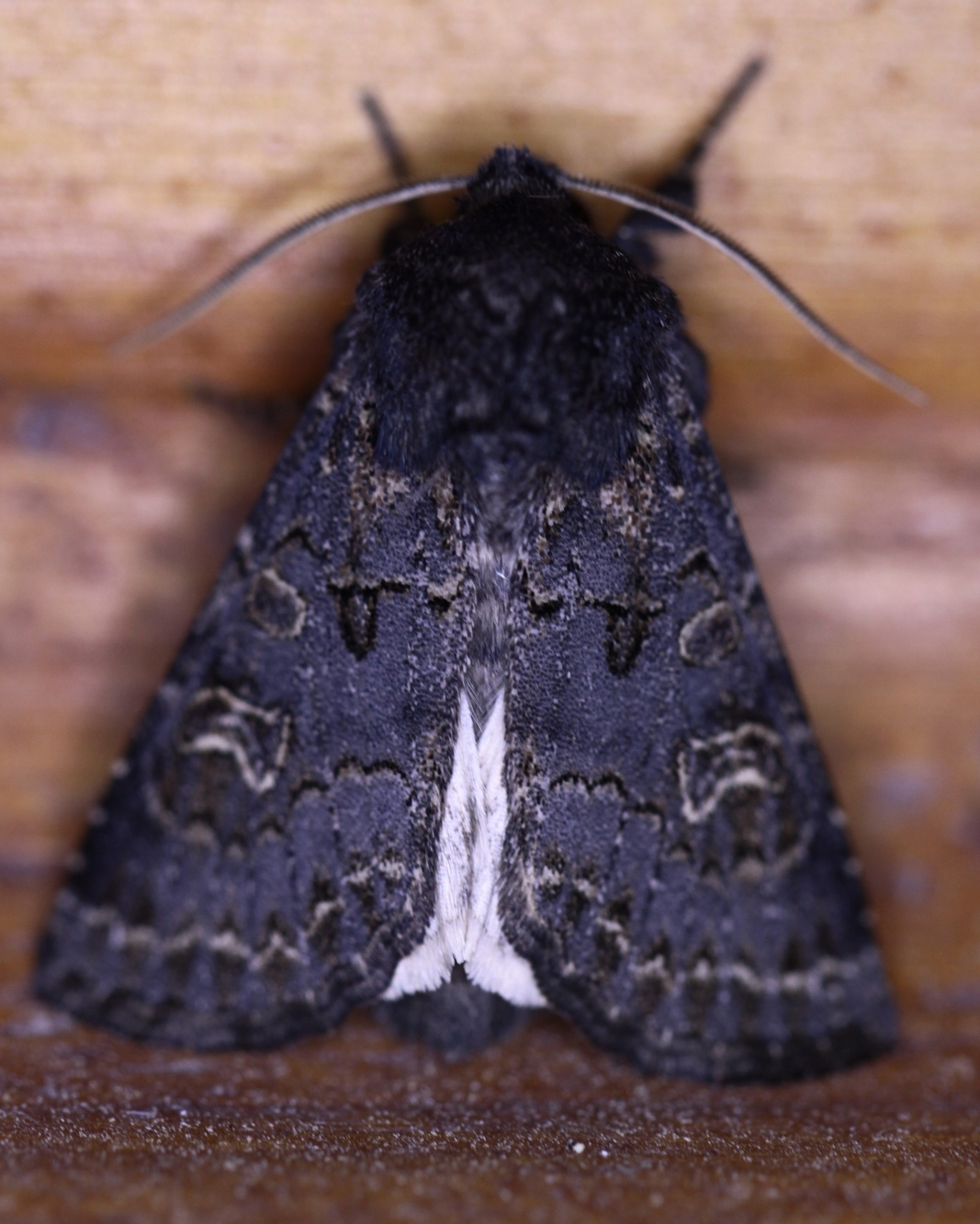

Scientific classification
- Kingdom: Animalia
- Phylum: Arthropoda
- Class: Insecta
- Order: Lepidoptera
- Superfamily: Noctuoidea
- Family: Noctuidae
- Genus: Tholera
- Species: T. cespitis

Binomial name
- Tholera cespitis (Denis & Schiffermüller, 1775)

Synonyms
- Noctua cespitis Denis & Schiffermüller, 1775; Noctua hordei Schrank, 1801; Agrotis autumnalis Stephens, 1827; Charaeas confinis Stephens, 1829; Apamea chloris Milliére, 1883; Neuronia cespitis var. decolor Sohn-Rethel, 1896

= Tholera cespitis =

Species of moth

Tholera cespitis, the hedge rustic, is a moth of the family Noctuidae. The species was first described by Michael Denis and Ignaz Schiffermüller in 1775. It is found through the Palearctic from Europe to the Altai Mountains of Siberia.

== Technical description and variation ==
The wingspan is 34–40 mm. The forewings are dark earth brown (though appearing iridescent purplish blue under some light conditions); lines indistinct; inner and outer black with paler edges; submarginal pale, with black wedge-shaped spots before it; claviform stigma obscure, black-edged; orbicular roundish, brown with pale ring; reniform large with paler outline, especially externally; hindwing whitish, the veins dark; termen diffusely brownish; in male white, with termen narrowly grey; — ab. ferruginea Hofm. (Carinthia and the Tyrol) is much paler with a reddish-yellow tint.

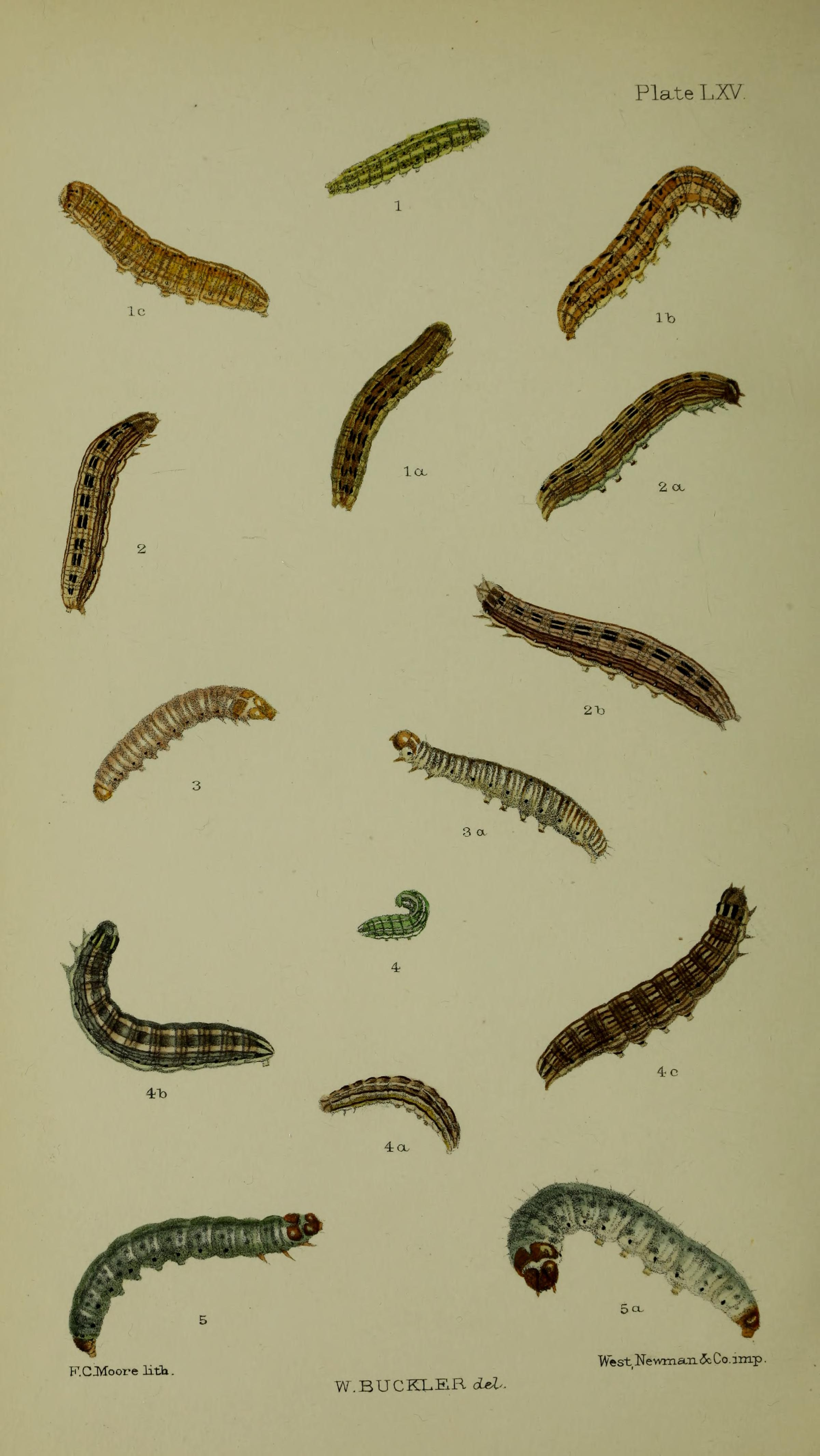
Figs. 4 young larva 4a half grown larva 4b, 4c larva after last moult

== Biology ==
There is one generation per year with adults on wing from the end of July to September.

Larva shining dark brown; thoracic and anal plates black; head brown; dorsal and subdorsal lines narrow, pale yellow; lateral stripe broader; spiracles black. The larvae feed on various grasses, including Nardus stricta, Calamagrostis purpurea, Festuca and Deschampsia species. Larvae can be found from March to July. The species overwinters as an egg.

== Subspecies ==
- Tholera cespitis cespitis
- Tholera cespitis armena Hacker, 1986
