= Campelia =

Campelia can refer to:

- A genus that is now included as a taxonomic section within Tradescantia
- An orthographic variant of Campella, which is a synonym of Deschampsia
