= Deschampsia bolanderi =

Scientific classification
- Kingdom: Plantae
- Clade: Tracheophytes
- Clade: Angiosperms
- Clade: Monocots
- Clade: Commelinids
- Order: Poales
- Family: Poaceae
- Subfamily: Pooideae
- Genus: Deschampsia
- Species: D. bolanderi

Binomial name
- Deschampsia bolanderi (Thurb.) Saarela

Synonyms
- Lepturus bolanderi Thurb.; Scribneria bolanderi (Thurb.) Hack.

Species of grass

Deschampsia bolanderi, synonym Scribneria bolanderi, is a species of flowering plant in the grass family Poaceae, native to west coast of North America from Washington State to Mexico (northern Baja California). It is known by the English name Scribner's grass. When placed in the genus Scribneria, it was the only species.

== Taxonomy ==
The species was first described by George Thurber in 1868 as Lepturus bolanderi. It was transferred to his new genus Scribneria as Scribneria bolanderi by Eduard Hackel in 1886. It was the only species in the genus. Scribneria was later synonymized with Deschampsia, and this species became Deschampsia bolanderi. As of November 2024, the transfer to Deschampsia was accepted by sources such as Plants of the World Online and the World Flora Online. Some other sources maintained the placement in Scribneria.
