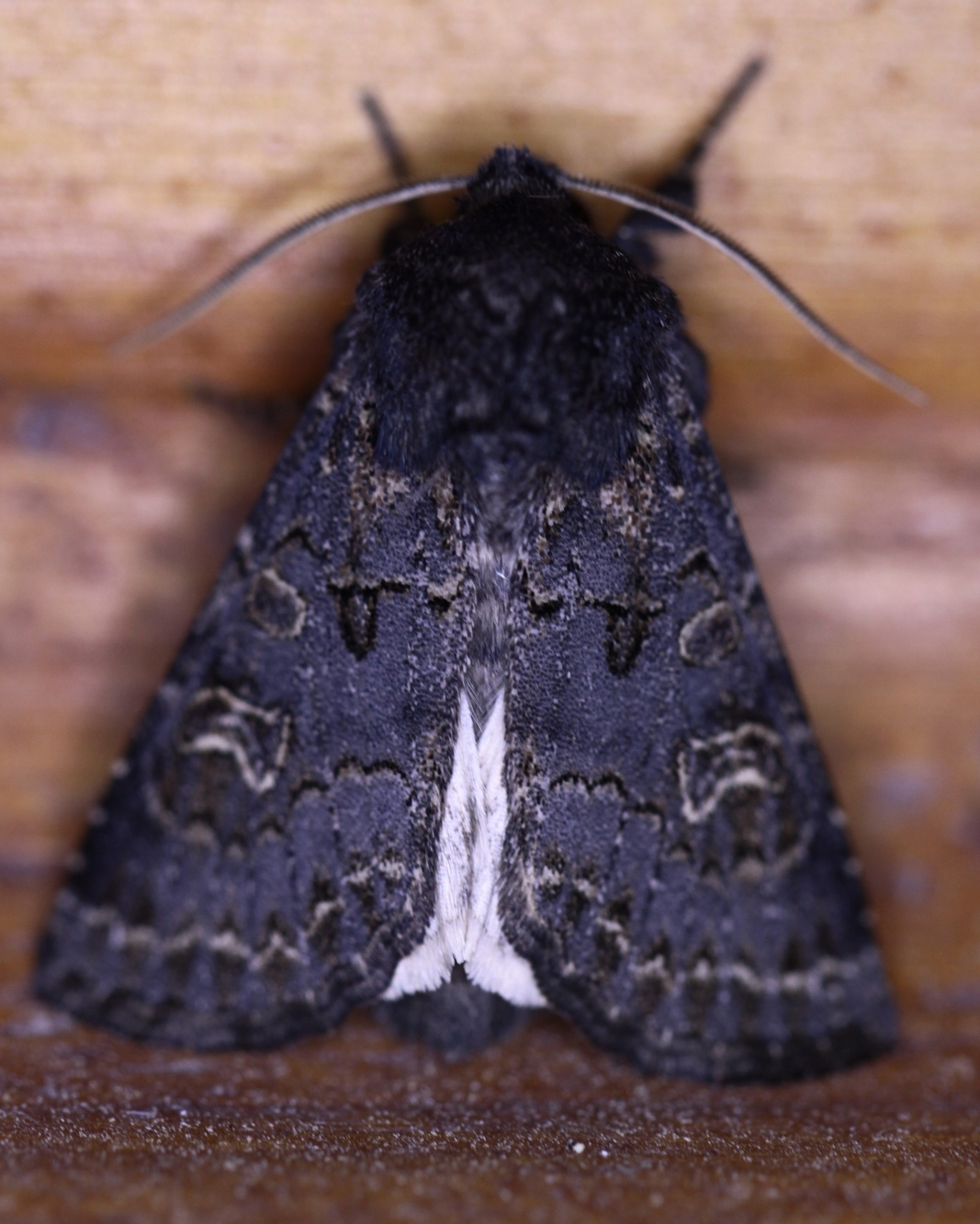
- Tholera cespitis

Scientific classification
- Kingdom: Animalia
- Phylum: Arthropoda
- Clade: Pancrustacea
- Class: Insecta
- Order: Lepidoptera
- Superfamily: Noctuoidea
- Family: Noctuidae
- Tribe: Tholerini
- Genus: Tholera; Hübner, 1821

= Tholera =

Genus of moths

Tholera is a genus of moths of the family Noctuidae.

== Species ==
- Tholera americana Smith, 1894
- Tholera cespitis Denis & Schiffermüller, 1775
- Tholera decimalis – Feathered Gothic Poda, 1761
- Tholera gracilis Kostrowicki, 1963
- Tholera hilaris Staudinger, 1901
