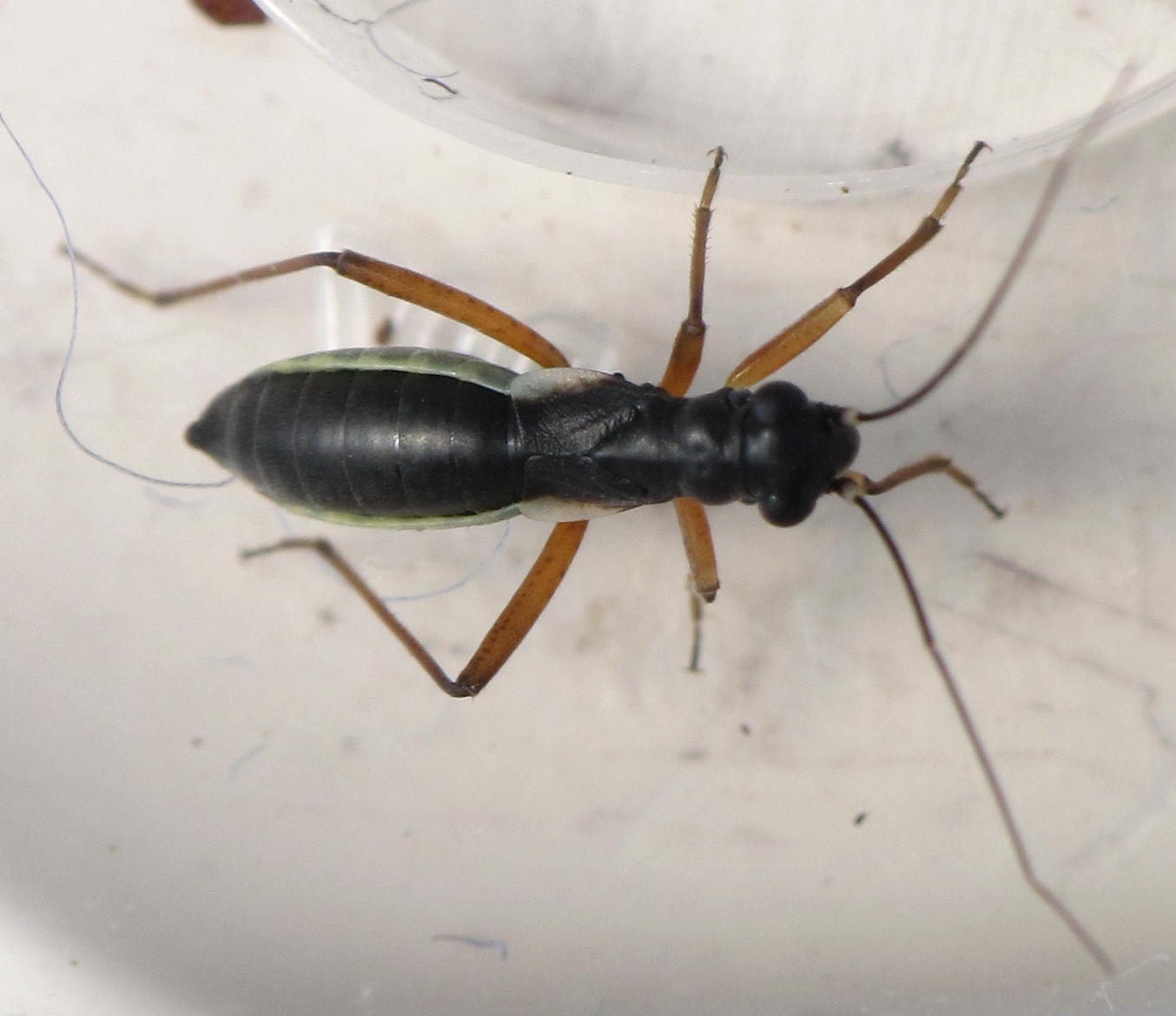
- Pithanus maerkelii

Scientific classification
- Kingdom: Animalia
- Phylum: Arthropoda
- Clade: Pancrustacea
- Class: Insecta
- Order: Hemiptera
- Suborder: Heteroptera
- Family: Miridae
- Subfamily: Mirinae
- Tribe: Stenodemini
- Genus: Pithanus; Fieber, 1858

= Pithanus =

Genus of true bugs

Pithanus is a genus of plant bugs in the family Miridae. There are at least three described species in Pithanus.

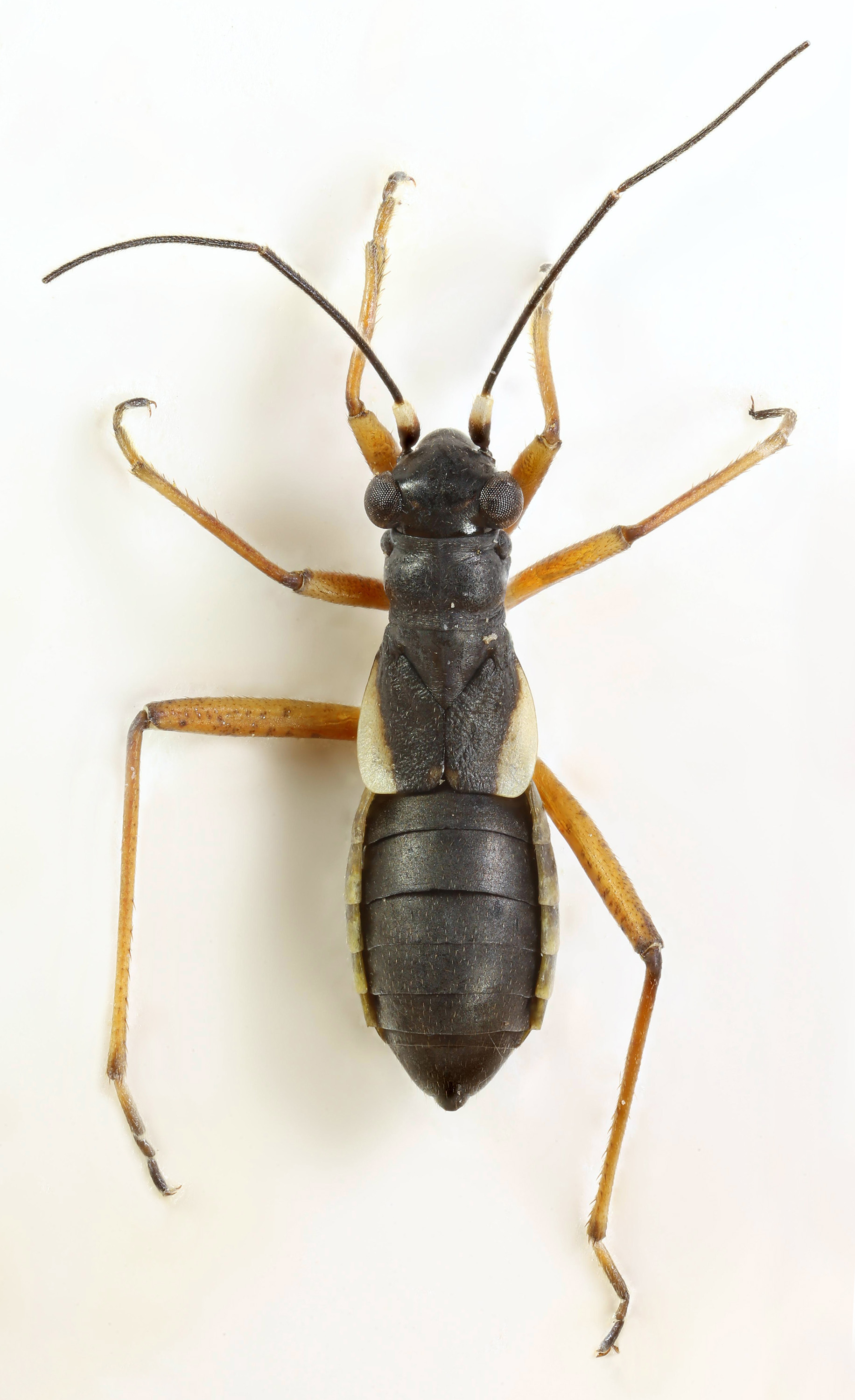
Pithanus maerkelii

== Species ==
These three species belong to the genus Pithanus:

- Pithanus hrabei Stehlik, 1952
- Pithanus maerkelii (Herrich-schaeffer, 1838)
- Pithanus marshalli Douglas & Scott, 1868
