= Deschampsia aurea =

Conservation status
- Vulnerable (IUCN 3.1)

Scientific classification
- Kingdom: Plantae
- Clade: Tracheophytes
- Clade: Angiosperms
- Clade: Monocots
- Clade: Commelinids
- Order: Poales
- Family: Poaceae
- Subfamily: Pooideae
- Genus: Deschampsia
- Species: D. aurea

Binomial name
- Deschampsia aurea (Munro ex Wedd.) Saarela

Synonyms
- Calamagrostis aurea (Munro ex Wedd.) Hack. ex Sodiro

Species of grass

Deschampsia aurea is a species of grass in the family Poaceae. It is found only in Ecuador.
