= Deschampsia angusta =

Conservation status
- Vulnerable (IUCN 3.1)

Scientific classification
- Kingdom: Plantae
- Clade: Tracheophytes
- Clade: Angiosperms
- Clade: Monocots
- Clade: Commelinids
- Order: Poales
- Family: Poaceae
- Subfamily: Pooideae
- Genus: Deschampsia
- Species: D. angusta

Binomial name
- Deschampsia angusta Stapf & Hubbard

Species of grass

Deschampsia angusta is a species of grass in the family Poaceae. It is found in Kenya and Uganda. Its natural habitat is Alpine wetlands.
