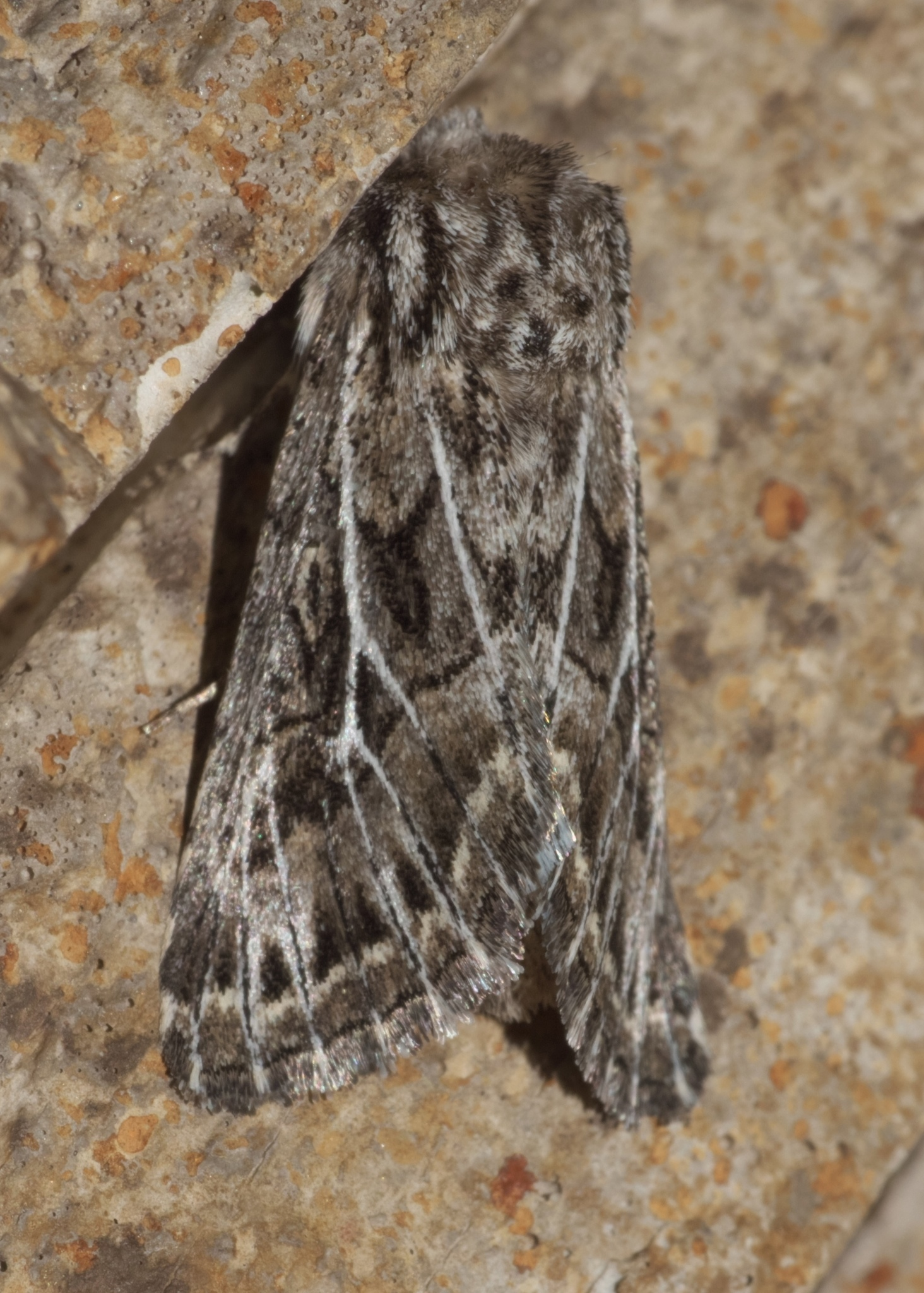
- Tholera americana, Wyoming

Scientific classification
- Kingdom: Animalia
- Phylum: Arthropoda
- Class: Insecta
- Order: Lepidoptera
- Superfamily: Noctuoidea
- Family: Noctuidae
- Tribe: Tholerini
- Genus: Tholera
- Species: T. americana

Binomial name
- Tholera americana (Smith, 1894)

= Tholera americana =

Species of moth

Tholera americana is a species of cutworm or dart moth in the family Noctuidae. It is found in North America.

The MONA or Hodges number for Tholera americana is 10523.
