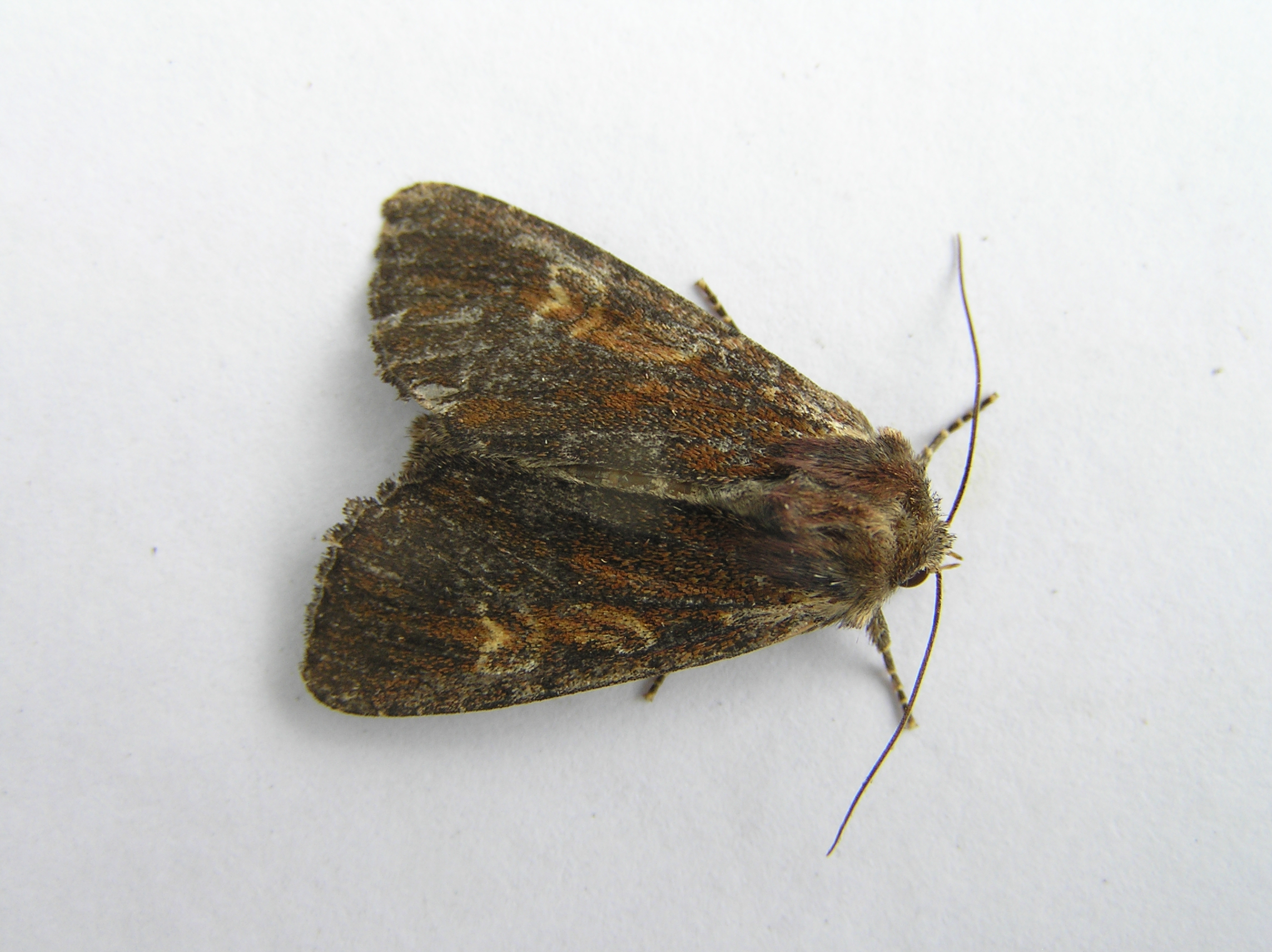

Scientific classification
- Kingdom: Animalia
- Phylum: Arthropoda
- Clade: Pancrustacea
- Class: Insecta
- Order: Lepidoptera
- Superfamily: Noctuoidea
- Family: Noctuidae
- Genus: Apamea
- Species: A. crenata

Binomial name
- Apamea crenata (Hufnagel, 1766)

= Apamea crenata =

Clouded-bordered brindle

Species of moth

Apamea crenata, known as the clouded-bordered brindle, is a moth in the family Noctuidae. It is distributed throughout the Palearctic realm. In the North it crosses the Arctic Circle, in the Mediterranean it is found only in cool locations and mountains avoiding very hot areas. In the Alps, it rises to an altitude of about 2000 metres.

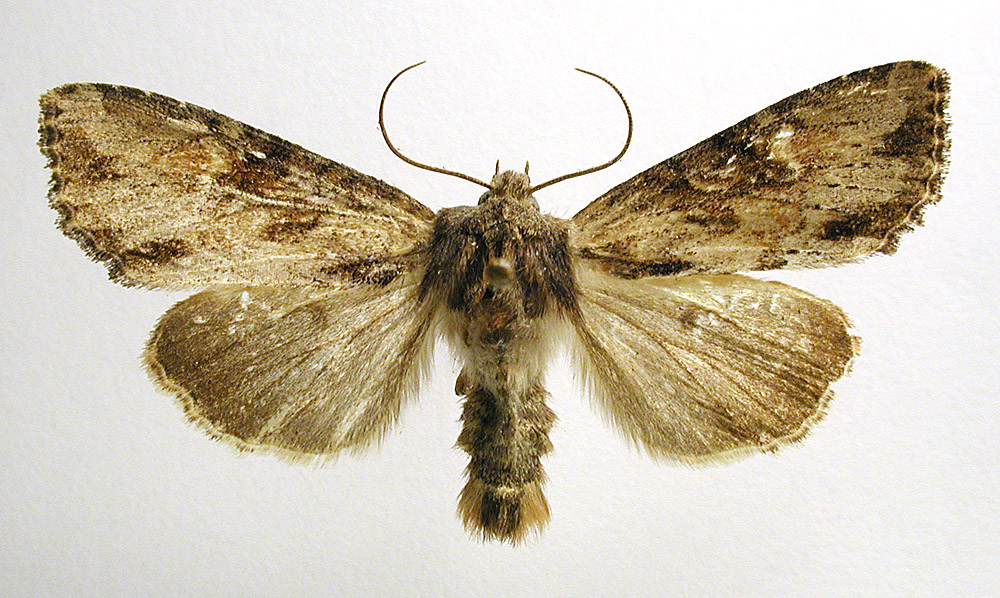
Mounted

== Description ==
This species has a wingspan of 36 to 44 mm. The forewings are pale brown with darker patches along the margins, usually with prominent markings at the base and tornus. The hindwings are grayish with darker venation. Melanic forms occur fairly frequently.

== Technical description and variation ==
Forewing pale lilac grey, often washed with pale brownish; the veins paler: costal area tinged with purplish grey; inner margin with white, and with a strong black streak near base: inner and outer lines double, brownish, the outer followed by a double row of dark brown vein dots with a white dot between; claviform stigma brown, with darker outline; orbicular generally elongate and narrow, sometimes shortened and rounder, with centre brown as in reniform and pale outline, the outer half of the reniform paler than the inner, and the lower lobe dark; cell and median shade brown, the latter not reaching below cell; marginal area beyond submarginal line dark redbrown, emitting large teeth inwards on the two folds; hind wing fuscous, pale grey towards base. Aberration (ab.) argentea Tutt is a form from Scotland in which the ground colour of forewings is shining silvery whitish, with traces of faint brownish costal streaks; the terminal area and basal streaks pale brown; all other markings obsolete, except a trace of reniform stigma: hindwing pale grey; - Forma ochrea Tutt and intermedia Tutt seem to represent merely the type form when washed with pale ochreous, or with rufous ochreous respectively, this last being the commonest form in Britain; -forma flavorufa Tutt is a rare form, from the North of England and Scotland only, with ground colour dull yellow red, with the ordinary markings obsolete, except the stigmata which are distinct and outlined with yellow; some short yellow costal dashes, a yellow patch at base of costa and some yellow scales on the dark veins; -the form putris Hbn. has the whole of forewing suffused with dull grey brown, the median area between inner and outer lines darker brown from costa to inner margin; the white scales of inner margin plainer; some examples are more uniformly dark and with obscured markings, while others are paler brown and show the markings clearly: - forma combusta Haw. is a dark fuscous form of this, in which the basal area and both hues are mixed with white scales, the outer edge of the reniform being also whitish; ab. alopecurus Esp.is red-brown with the veins dark, the costa and inner margin and sometimes the veins dusted with whitish, and the stigmata edged with yellow; the two folds redder than the rest; in some cases this red tint predominates and makes the whole wing red; in others the blackish shades overpower the red, these last being nigrorubida Tutt; - ab. subrurea Petersen is a form with the forewing darkened with grey brown, with clear markings, and the reniform not picked out with yellow - extincta Stgr. from Issykkul and Kuku Nor, has the forewing pale uniform lilac grey; the terminal area and the cell dull redbrown; the hues very indistinctly expressed; the stigmata pale grey, the outer edge of the reniform whitish; the dark form corresponding to this, (as alopecurus does to typical rurea) - ab. uniformis ab. nov.[Warren] is wholly dull dark liver colour, with no markings except the pale inner and outer lines and the whitish outer edge of the reniform stigma; the hindwing, as in extincta, smooth pale grey.

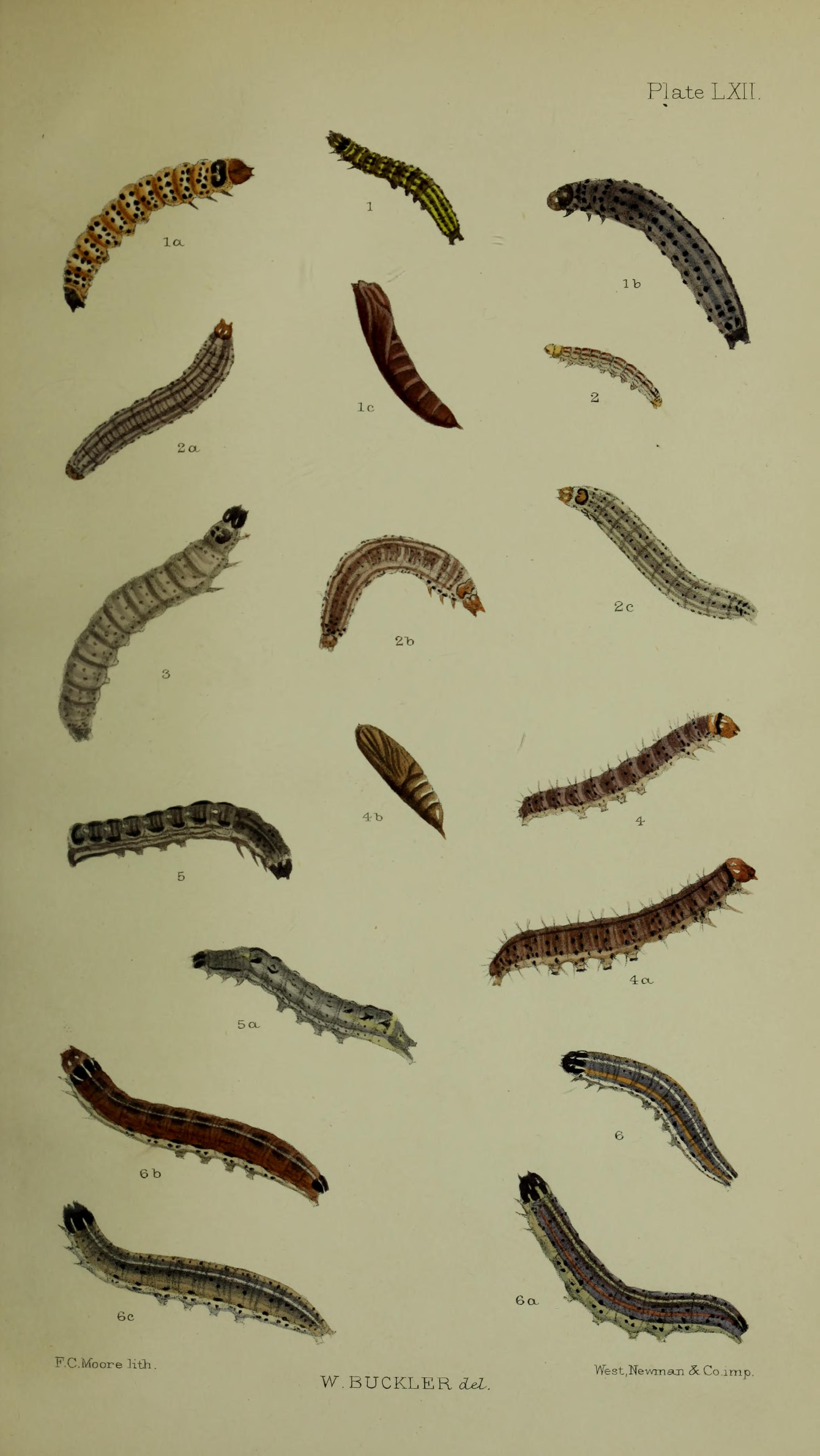
Figs.6, 6a, 6b, 6c larvae after final moult

== Biology ==
Apamea crenata occupies varied habitats. It colonizes grass-rich, uncut, and moist to mesophilic places such as wet meadows, fens, forest edges or clearings, mountain and valley meadows, in heaths and moorland areas as well as in gardens and parks. In the British Isles the moth flies at night from May to July. It is attracted to light and sugar, particularly nectar-rich flowers. Adult caterpillars are brown-grey to earth-grey coloured. They have a yellow-and-white dorsal line. On each body segment there are black spots and black point warts. The lateral stripe is yellow and white. Head, the neck shield and anus shield are black-brown. Three bright longitudinal stripes stand out from the neck shield. The maroon pupa is equipped with two thorns and four short hooks on the cremaster. The larva feeds on various grasses including orchard grasses, tussock grasses, fescues, and canarygrasses. This species overwinters as a larva and feeds in mild weather throughout the season.
