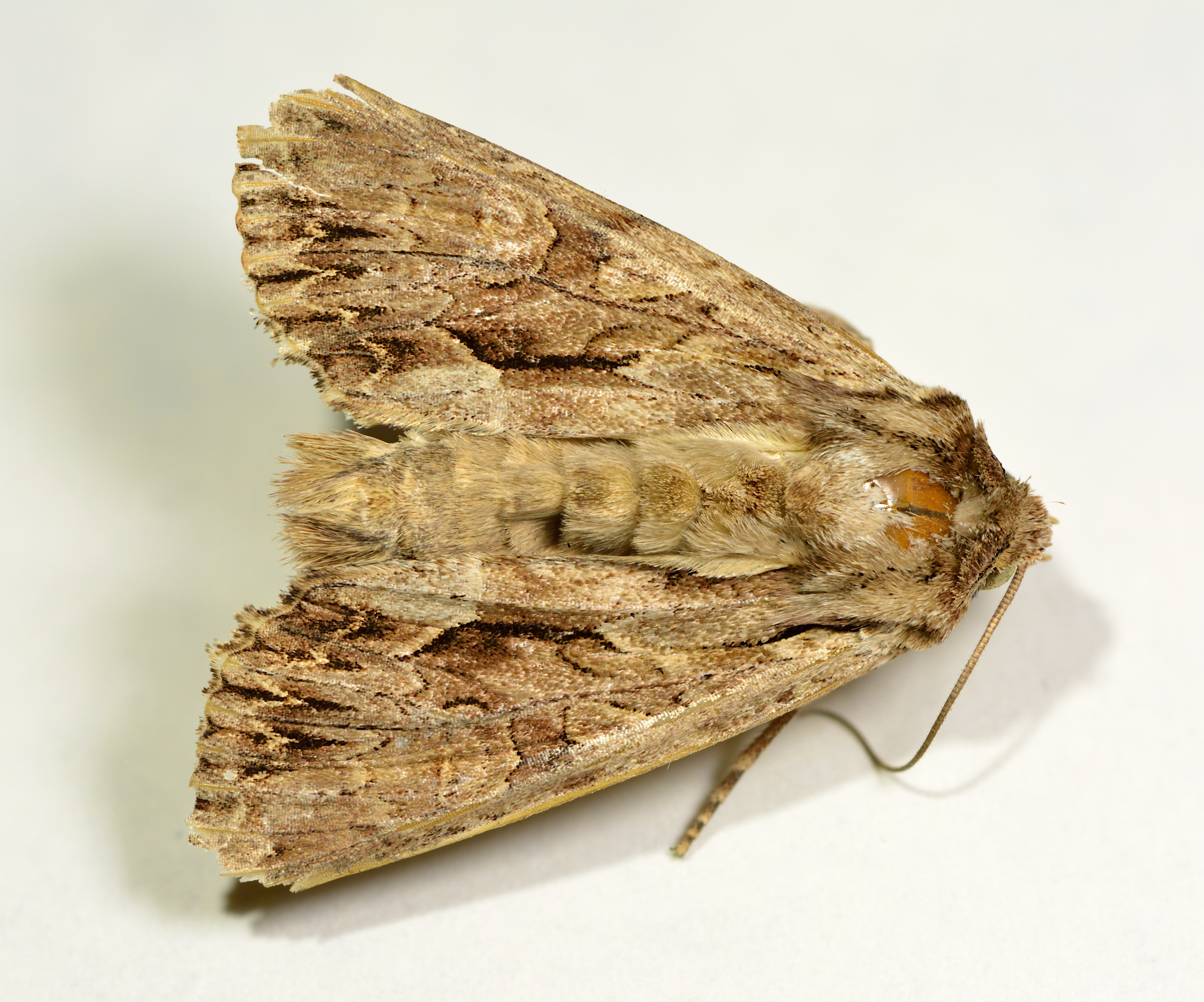

Scientific classification
- Kingdom: Animalia
- Phylum: Arthropoda
- Clade: Pancrustacea
- Class: Insecta
- Order: Lepidoptera
- Superfamily: Noctuoidea
- Family: Noctuidae
- Genus: Apamea
- Species: A. monoglypha

Binomial name
- Apamea monoglypha (Hufnagel, 1766)

Synonyms
- Phalaena monoglypha Hufnagel, 1766; Abromias monoglypha

= Apamea monoglypha =

Dark arches

Species of moth

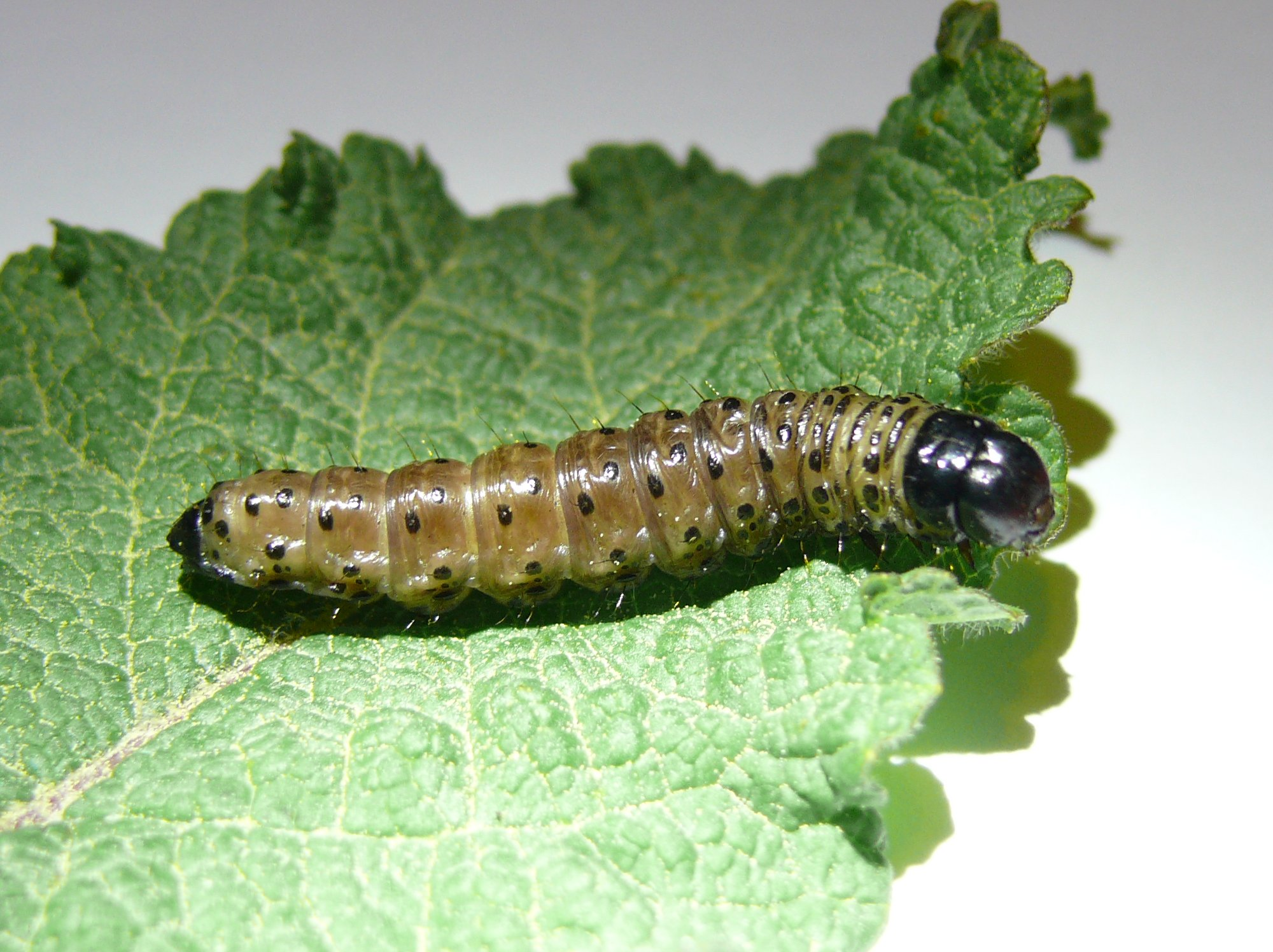
Larva

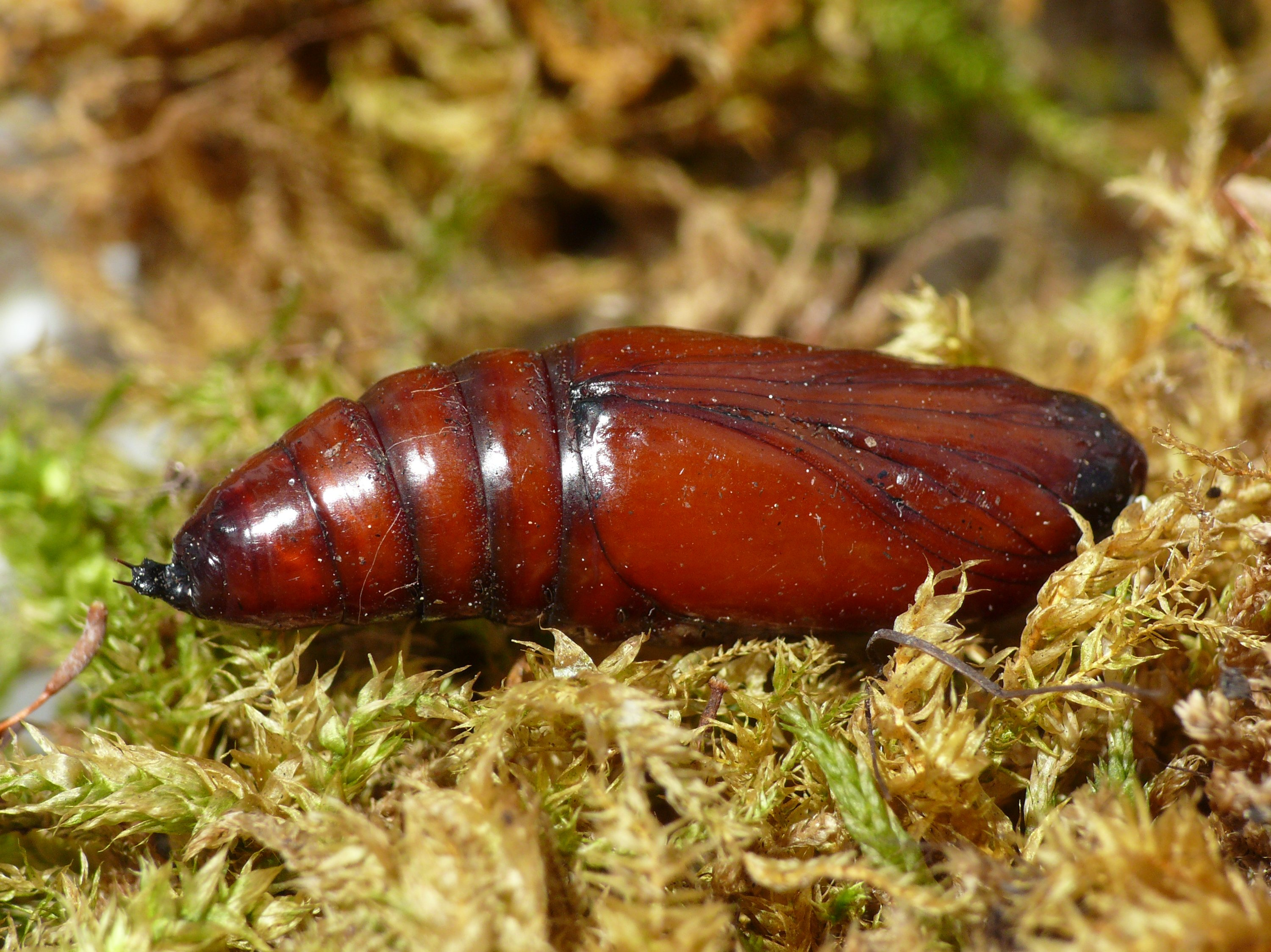
Pupa

Dark variant

Apamea monoglypha, the dark arches, is a moth of the family Noctuidae. The species was first described by Johann Siegfried Hufnagel in 1766. It is a common, sometimes abundant, European species. It is found in most of Europe except northernmost Fennoscandia and the southern parts of the Iberian Peninsula and Greece. The species is also found in Anatolia, Turkestan, Western Asia and Central Asia, Siberia and Mongolia. In the Alps it is found up to heights of 2,500 meters. The smaller subspecies sardoa is found on Sardinia and Corsica.

This species has a wingspan of 46 to 54 mm, the forewings varying from pale greyish brown to almost black and cryptically patterned. All but the darkest individuals usually have an obvious black mark close to the dorsum and a pale zigzag subterminal line. The hindwings are whitish with darker venation and a dark shaded band at the margin. The larva is dull whitish grey or dark grey; dorsal line pale: lateral line broadly pale; tubercles large and black; head and thoracic plate brown black.

== Technical description and variation ==
Forewing varying from whitish ochreous, through pale and dark grey to brownish grey, dark brown and black; a black streak from base below cell, another above inner margin near base, and a third, more strongly marked, along submedian fold between the claviform stigma and outer line; inner and outer lines pale, with dark edges; claviform small, dark edged; upper stigmata large, of the ground colour or paler, with pale rings and dark outlines; the orbicular varying in shape, generally oblique and elongate, sometimes shortened, and more rarely rounded; submarginal line pale, zigzag, preceded by black wedge-shaped marks, the terminal area, except at apex, darker; inner margin usually marked with white scales, developed beyond outer line into a more or less prominent pale patch reaching submedian fold; hindwing dirty greyish, with darker cell spot and veins, with a broad fuscous marginal border preceded by a dark outer line; — ab. pallida Fuchs is wholly whitish ochreous, with all the black streaks plain, the stigmata black edged; the central area and the terminal washed with brownish grey; hindwing whitish with an ochreous grey faintly marked border — in intacta Petersen the usual pale patch beyond outer line on inner margin is absent, the whole wing being suffused with grey or grey brown; — ab. obscura Th. Mieg. represents a suffused brown or grey-brown form; — infuscata Buch. White is a northern form with the markings more or less obscured and hidden by blackish suffusion, of which brunnea Tutt is a brown black offshoot; the extreme form of this, when all markings are lost in an intense black suffusion, is aethiops Tutt; in all these dark-suffused forms the hindwing is much darker, especially in the terminal.

This moth flies at night. In the British Isles it is active from June to August with a second brood sometimes emerging in September and October. It is attracted to light, sugar and many nectar-rich flowers.

The larva feeds at the roots of various grasses including tussock grasses, orchard grass, ryegrass, reed grasses, and fescues such as sheep's fescue. This species overwinters as a larva.
