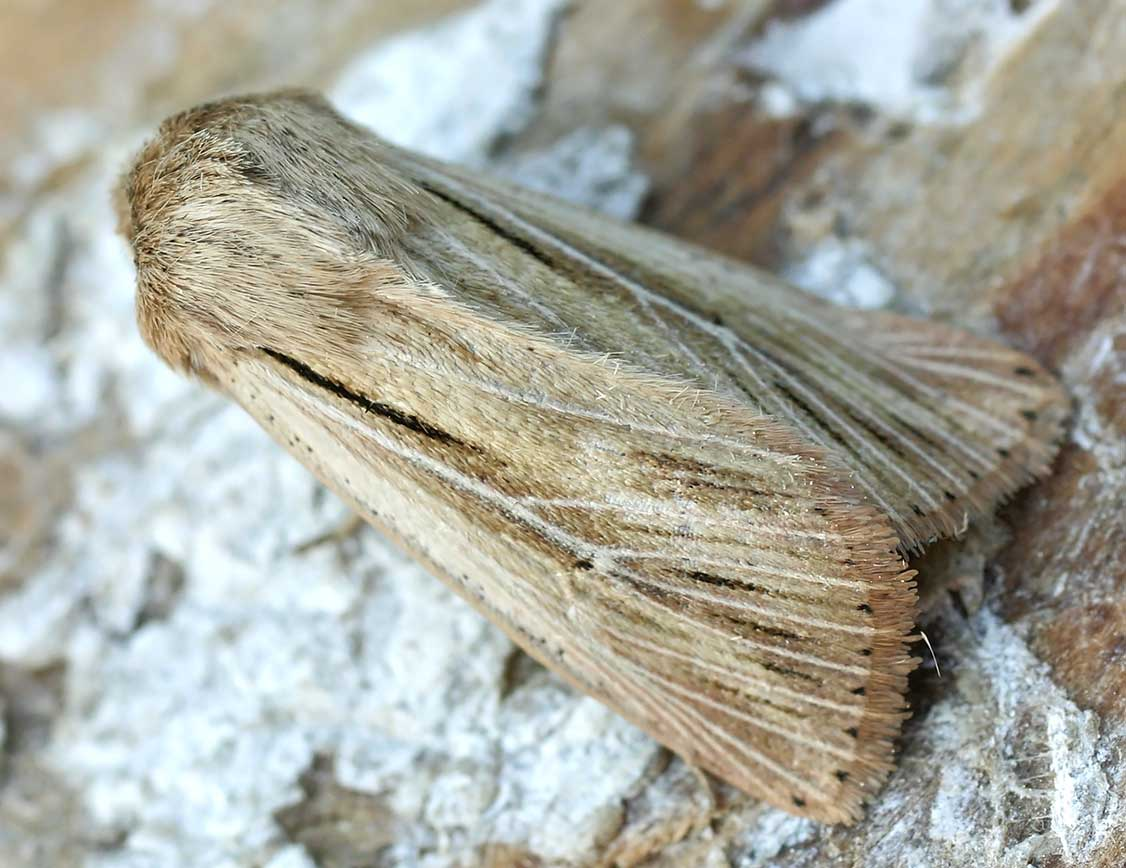

Scientific classification
- Kingdom: Animalia
- Phylum: Arthropoda
- Class: Insecta
- Order: Lepidoptera
- Superfamily: Noctuoidea
- Family: Noctuidae
- Genus: Leucania
- Species: L. comma

Binomial name
- Leucania comma (Linnaeus, 1761)

Synonyms
- Aletia comma; Mythimna comma

= Shoulder-striped wainscot =

Species of moth

The shoulder-striped wainscot (Leucania comma) is a moth of the family Noctuidae. The species was first described by Carl Linnaeus in 1761. Some authors place it in the genus Mythimna. It is found throughout Europe and in Russia to the west of the Urals.

The forewings of this species share the pale buffish ground colour and prominent venation of other "wainscots" but has much stronger dark markings than most of its relatives, including a thick black basal streak which gives it its common name. The hindwings are dingy grey or brown with lighter fringes.

== Technical description and variation ==
The wingspan is 35–42 mm. Forewing drab grey, suffused, except along costa and inner margin, and in an oblique fascia-form submarginal area, with blackish, the veins and folds remaining pale; a whitish lunule on discocellular: the pale submarginal fascia externally throw's off pale teeth along the veins to termen, the wedge shaped intervals being filled in with black; a long black streak from base below cell; median vein white, with only a small white spot at end of cell and a minute black point above it; veins whitish with black terminal streaks in the intervals. Hindwing dark greyish, fuscous.

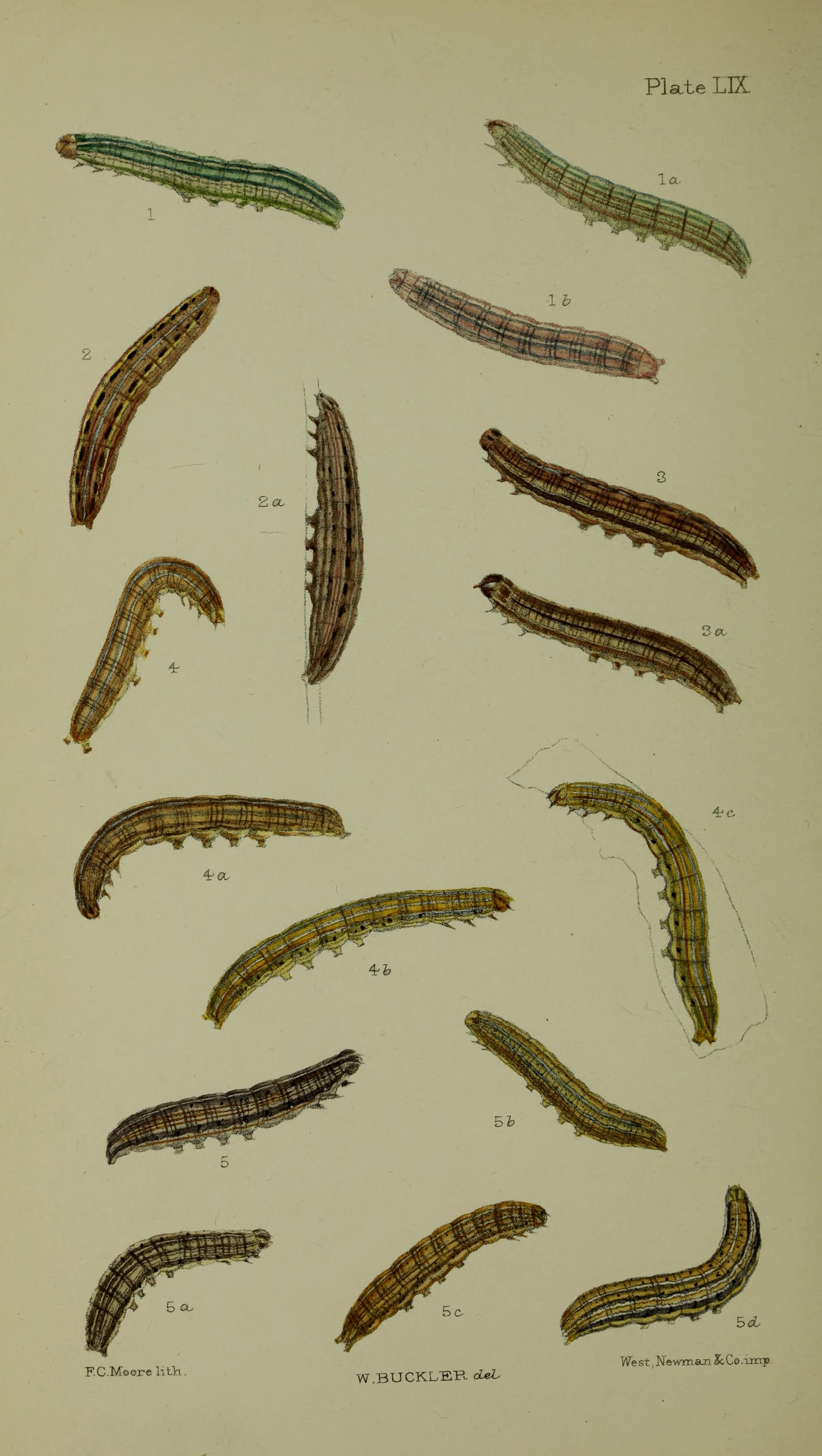
Figs 3, 3a larva after last moult

== Biology ==
This species flies at night in June and July and is attracted to light and sugar.

Larvae are reddish brown, with scattered black clots: dorsal and subdorsal lines black and fine; venter paler; thoracic plate black with three white lines; head brown. The larvae feed on various grasses including Deschampsia and Festuca. The species overwinters as a full-grown larva in a cell beneath the surface of the soil.

The species lives mainly on damp meadows, preferably in mountains and hills. In the Alps, it was found up to at an altitude of 2100 meters.
