= Tholera hilaris =

Scientific classification
- Kingdom: Animalia
- Phylum: Arthropoda
- Clade: Pancrustacea
- Class: Insecta
- Order: Lepidoptera
- Superfamily: Noctuoidea
- Family: Noctuidae
- Genus: Tholera
- Species: T. hilaris

Binomial name
- Tholera hilaris (Staudinger, 1901)

Synonyms
- Eupneuronia popularis var. hilaris Staudinger, 1901

Species of moth

Tholera hilaris is a species of moth of the family Noctuidae. It is found from the southern part of European Russia to the Caucasus region, Transcaucasia, Turkey and Israel.

Adults are on wing from September to October. There is one generation per year.
