= Mimoceps =

Scientific classification
- Kingdom: Animalia
- Phylum: Arthropoda
- Class: Insecta
- Order: Hemiptera
- Suborder: Heteroptera
- Family: Miridae
- Genus: Mimoceps; Uhler, 1890

Genus of true bugs

Mimoceps is a genus of bugs from Miridae family.

== List of species ==
- Mimoceps insignis
