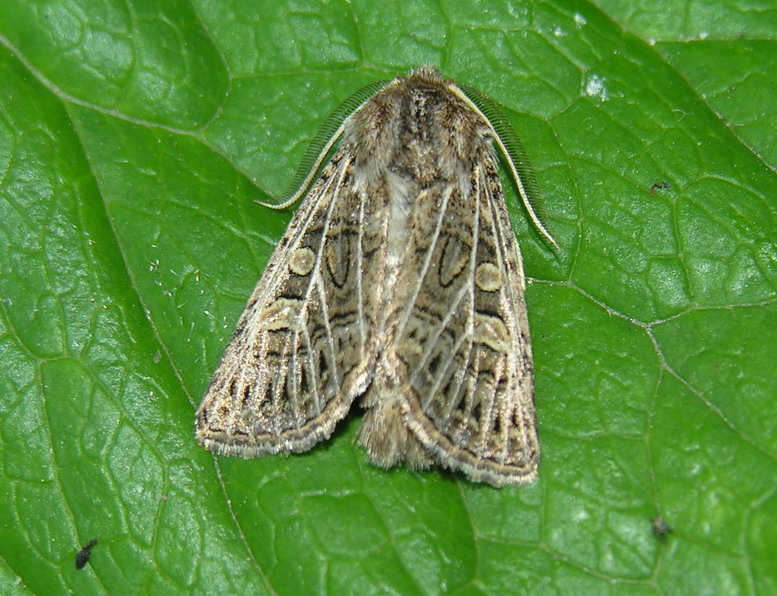

Scientific classification
- Kingdom: Animalia
- Phylum: Arthropoda
- Class: Insecta
- Order: Lepidoptera
- Superfamily: Noctuoidea
- Family: Noctuidae
- Genus: Tholera
- Species: T. decimalis

Binomial name
- Tholera decimalis (Poda, 1761)

= Tholera decimalis =

Species of moth

Tholera decimalis, the feathered Gothic, is a species of moth of the family Noctuidae. It is found in Europe and Scandinavia then through the Palearctic to Asia minor, western Central Asia, southern Siberia and in North Africa.

== Technical description and variation ==
The wingspan is 38–48 mm. Forewing olive fuscous tinged with purple;all the veins white; inner and outer lines double, black; submarginal whitish, preceded by black wedgeshaped spots; claviform stigma of the ground colour outlined with whitish and black and with a pale linear centre; upper stigmata white-ringed with olive centres, reniform with a curved pale line at centre; wing in male dull white with fuscous termen, in female wholly fuscous with base alone paler; — ab. hilaris Stgr. is smaller and paler, the hindwing of male whitish.

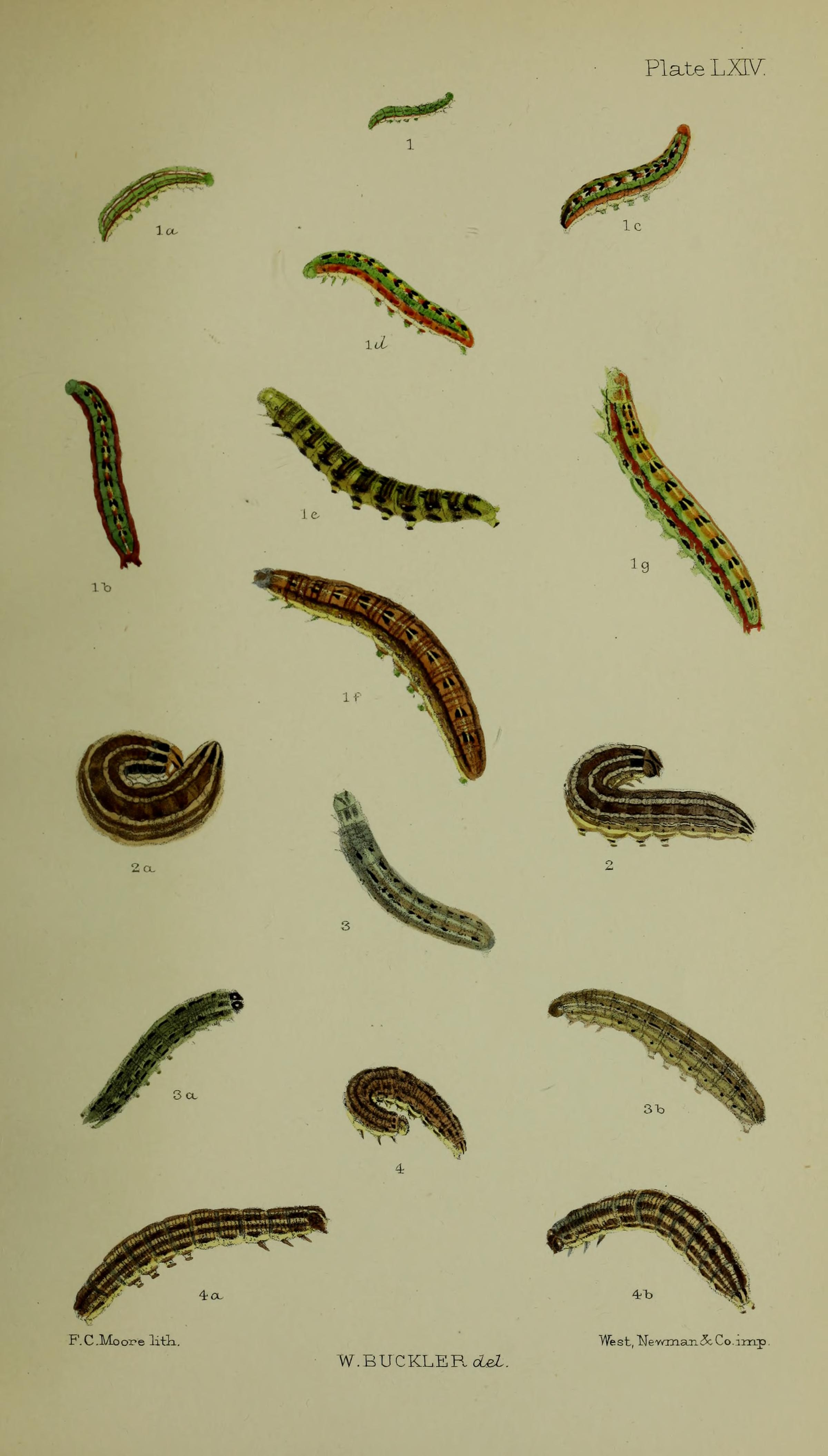
Figs 2, 2a, larva after last moult

== Biology ==
The moth flies from August to September depending on the location.

Larva shining bronzy brownish, with the tubercles large and black; head and thoracic plate dark brown. Younger caterpillars are initially greenish coloured and change their colour with increasing development of shiny brownish tints. The dorsal and laterodorsal lines are yellow-brown. The larvae feed at the roots of various grasses, living through the winter and feeding up in summer. .

Steppe, grassy hillsides, gardens and meadows and pastures are the main habitat.
