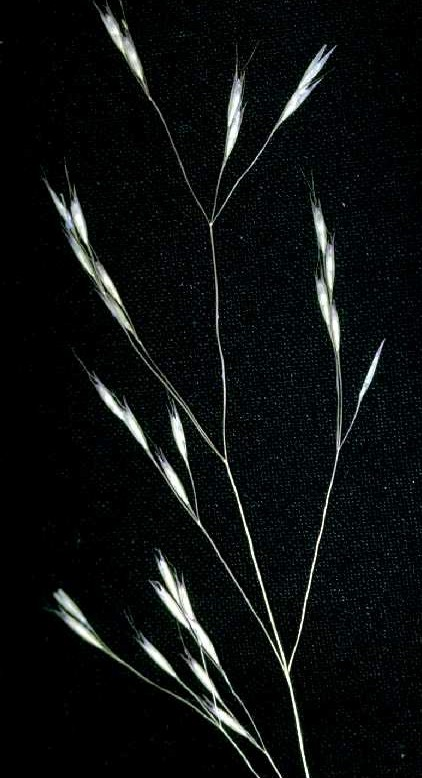

Scientific classification
- Kingdom: Plantae
- Clade: Tracheophytes
- Clade: Angiosperms
- Clade: Monocots
- Clade: Commelinids
- Order: Poales
- Family: Poaceae
- Subfamily: Pooideae
- Genus: Deschampsia
- Species: D. danthonioides

Binomial name
- Deschampsia danthonioides (Trin.) Munro

= Deschampsia danthonioides =

Species of flowering plant

Deschampsia danthonioides is a species of grass known by the common name annual hairgrass. It is native to western North America from the Yukon Territory and British Columbia, through California and the Western United States, to Baja California, and also to southern South America in Chile and Argentina.

The annual bunchgrass grows in moist to drying areas such as pond edges, meadows and grasslands, in various habitat types such as montane and chaparral.

== Description ==
Deschampsia danthonioides has stems growing solitary or in loose clumps up to 40 to 60 centimeters tall. The inflorescence is a narrow to open array of thin branches bearing small V-shaped spikelets.
