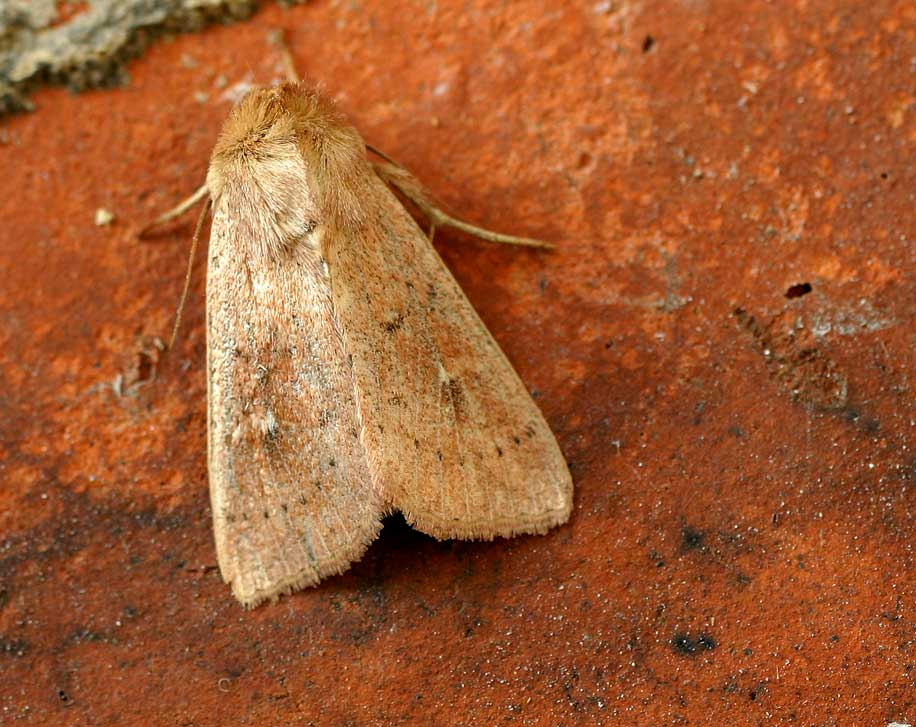

Scientific classification
- Kingdom: Animalia
- Phylum: Arthropoda
- Clade: Pancrustacea
- Class: Insecta
- Order: Lepidoptera
- Superfamily: Noctuoidea
- Family: Noctuidae
- Genus: Mythimna
- Species: M. ferrago

Binomial name
- Mythimna ferrago (Fabricius, 1787)

Synonyms
- Aletia ferrago

= Mythimna ferrago =

Clay

Species of moth

Mythimna ferrago, the clay, is a moth of the family Noctuidae. The species was first described by Johan Christian Fabricius in 1787. It is distributed throughout Europe and is also found in Morocco, Algeria, Turkey, Asia Minor, Armenia, Syria, Turkestan, Israel, Lebanon, Iraq, Iran, Central Asia and the western parts of temperate North Asia, and Tibet.

The forewings of this species vary from buffish to orangey brown, usually with a darker central line running lengthways down the wing, interrupted by a pale stigma. There are usually a few small dark spots in the basal area. The hindwings are dark grey with paler margins. The male is easily recognizable by a triangular area of black hair on the underside of the abdomen. The wingspan is 36–44 mm. This moth flies at night in July and August and is attracted to light and sugar.

== Technical description and variation ==
The wingspan is 36–44 mm. Forewing pale greyish rufous, speckled with dark; Lines indistinct, dark grey; the outer regularly lunulate-dentate, the teeth marked by black dashes on veins; reniform stigma obscure, ending in a cloudy pale spot at lower end of cell; hindwing greyish ochreous; ventral tufts black. The species varies in coloration: ferrago F. is the reddest form: - grisea Haw, is grey without any rufous admixture, with the markings generally clearer; fulvescens Tutt is rare, with fulvous in the place of red; — ab. marginata Tutt has silvery grey hindwings with broad dark border. See also Hacker et al., 2002 ,

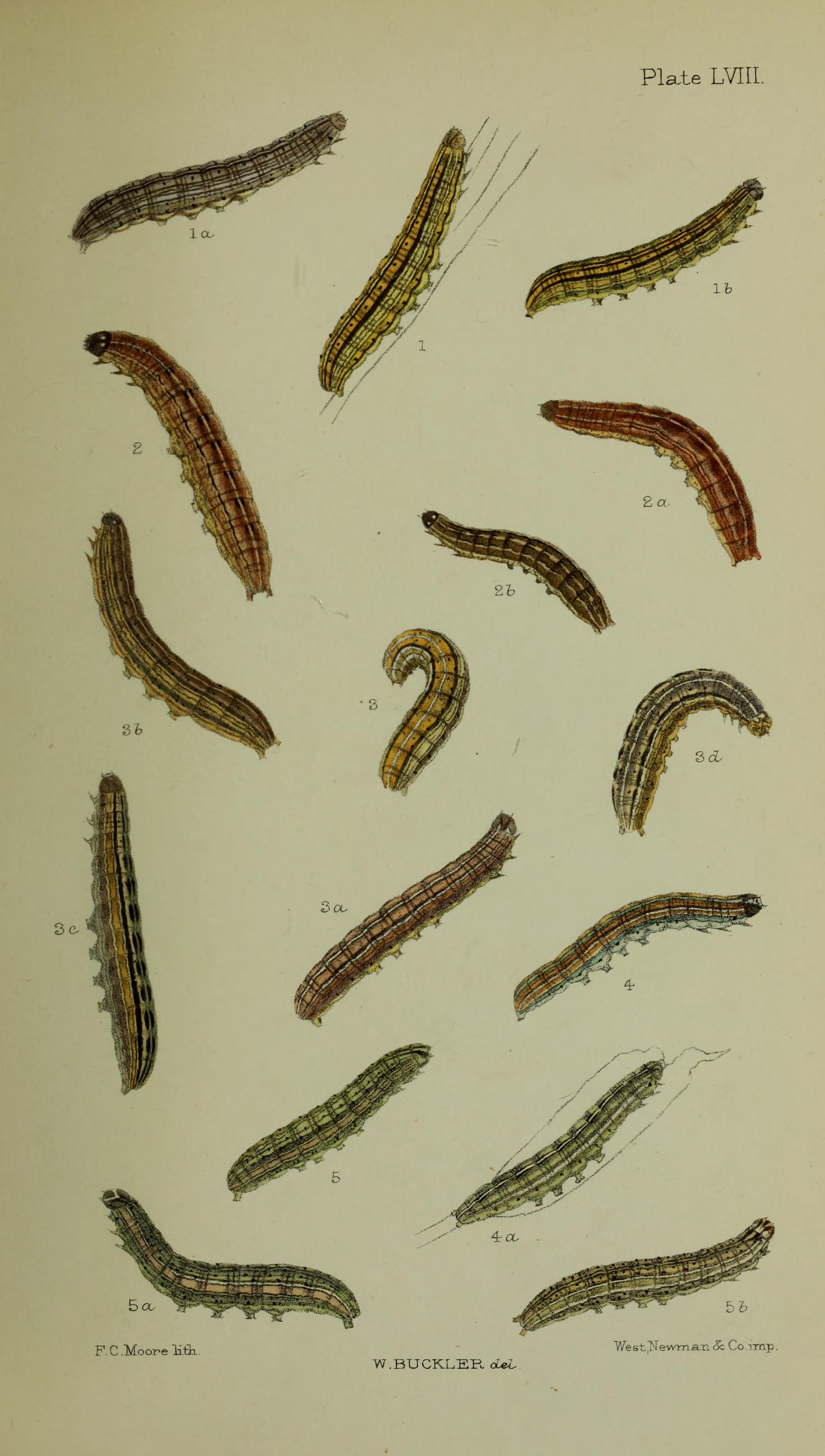
3, 3a, 3b, 3c, 3d larvae after final moult

== Biology ==
M.ferrago is found in almost all grassy habitats from dry-warm grassy slopes to cool-moist meadows near bogs and waterside areas. It also occurs on forest paths, clearings and snails in forests as well as in villages and cultivated land. In the Alps it rises to 1700 meters The larvae are brownish yellow with a white dorsal line; lateral lines broad, whiter, containing the black spiracles. It feeds on various grasses including Deschampsia. The species overwinters as a small larva.

1. The flight season refers to the British Isles. This may vary in other parts of the range.
