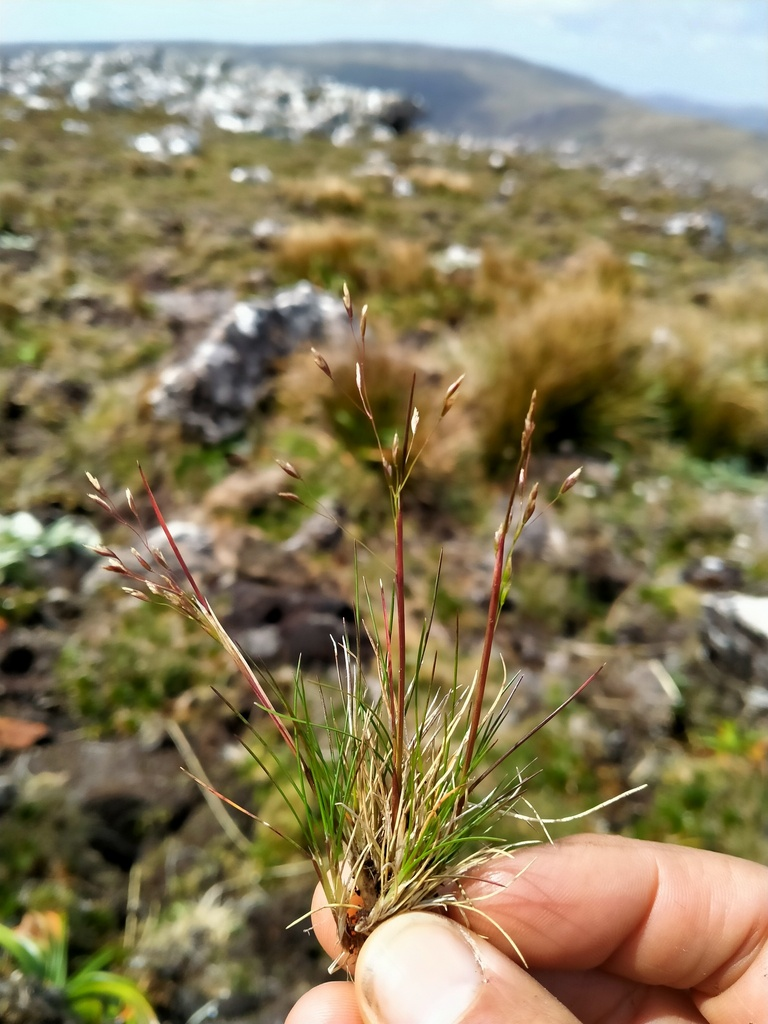
- Auckland Islands Nature Reserve, January 28, 2023

Scientific classification
- Kingdom: Plantae
- Clade: Tracheophytes
- Clade: Angiosperms
- Clade: Monocots
- Clade: Commelinids
- Order: Poales
- Family: Poaceae
- Subfamily: Pooideae
- Genus: Deschampsia
- Species: D. gracillima

Binomial name
- Deschampsia gracillima Kirk

= Deschampsia gracillima =

Species of flowering plant

Deschampsia gracillima is a species of grass, which was first described in 1891 by the botanist Thomas Kirk.

It is native to the South Island of New Zealand, and to Tasmania, where it is a threatened species.

== Description ==
Kirk describes it as follows:

Deschampsia gracillima, sp. n. — An erect, tufted, glabrous species.

Culm very slender, 2" - 5" high; leaves involute, narrow almost filiform, sheaths slightly inflated; ligule entire or lacerate. Panicle 3/4"-2" long,open; branches few, capillary; spikelets few, 2-flowered; outer glumes unequal, 5-nerved; flowering glumes with a pencil of hairs at the base, ovate, truncate, minutely 3-5 toothed, or else with a short dorsal awn inserted just below the apex; paler, minutely ciliated; rachilla silky; ladicules 3; grain free.

The flowering glumes in some instances are deeply and evenly toothed, in others the teeth are shallower: or the margin is merely erose. The lower flower is sessile within the outer glumes; the upper is carried on a short stipe, which is invariably silky. The grain is very large for the size of the flower.

Hab: Carnley Harbour, Auckland Islands, at 1000 ft.
