= Mimoceps insignis =

Scientific classification
- Kingdom: Animalia
- Phylum: Arthropoda
- Class: Insecta
- Order: Hemiptera
- Suborder: Heteroptera
- Family: Miridae
- Genus: Mimoceps
- Species: M. insignis

Binomial name
- Mimoceps insignis Uhler, 1890

Species of true bug

Mimoceps insignis is a species of plant bug from the Miridae family. It can be found in grass and open fields of the United States.

== Description ==
Specimens are 3.5 millimetres (0.14 in) long, are black coloured with 2 big yellow spots and orange legs.
