= Deschampsia robusta =

Conservation status
- Data Deficient (IUCN 3.1)

Scientific classification
- Kingdom: Plantae
- Clade: Tracheophytes
- Clade: Angiosperms
- Clade: Monocots
- Clade: Commelinids
- Order: Poales
- Family: Poaceae
- Subfamily: Pooideae
- Genus: Deschampsia
- Species: D. robusta

Binomial name
- Deschampsia robusta C.E.Hubb.

Species of grass

Deschampsia robusta is a species of grass in the family Poaceae. It is found on Gough Island, near Tristan da Cunha in the South Atlantic Ocean.
