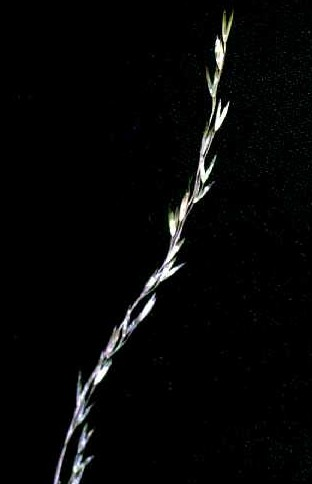

Scientific classification
- Kingdom: Plantae
- Clade: Tracheophytes
- Clade: Angiosperms
- Clade: Monocots
- Clade: Commelinids
- Order: Poales
- Family: Poaceae
- Subfamily: Pooideae
- Genus: Deschampsia
- Species: D. elongata

Binomial name
- Deschampsia elongata (Hook.) Munro

= Deschampsia elongata =

Species of flowering plant

Deschampsia elongata is a species of grass known by the common name slender hairgrass.

== Distribution ==
It is native to western North America from Alaska to Wyoming to northern Mexico, and South America in Chile. It grows at all elevations, often in moist areas.

== Description ==
It is a perennial grass forming dense clumps sometimes exceeding a meter in height. Most of the leaves are located in a tuft about the base of the stems. The inflorescence is a thin row of V-shaped spikelets arranged parallel to and mostly flat against the stem.

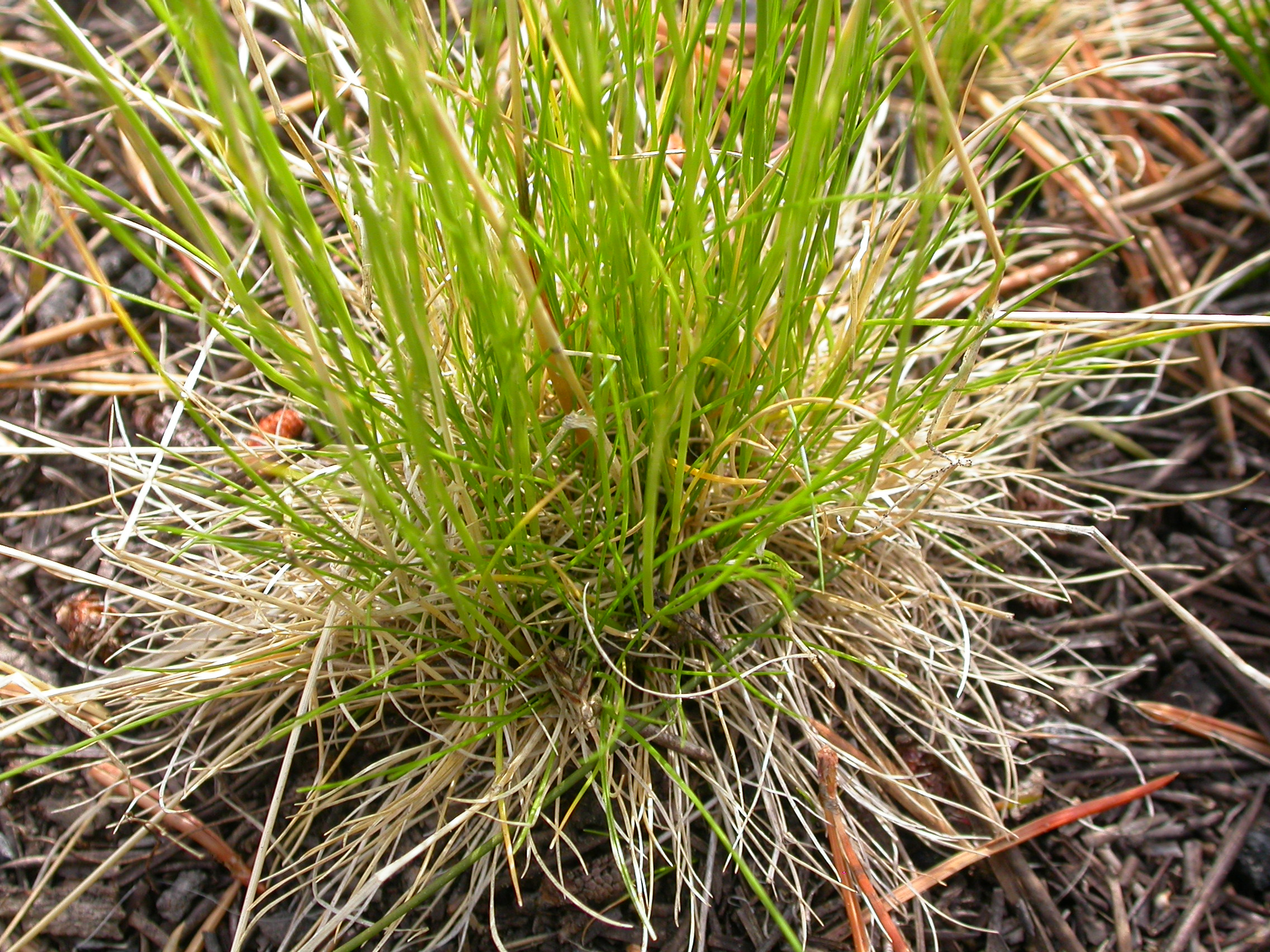
Individual clump.

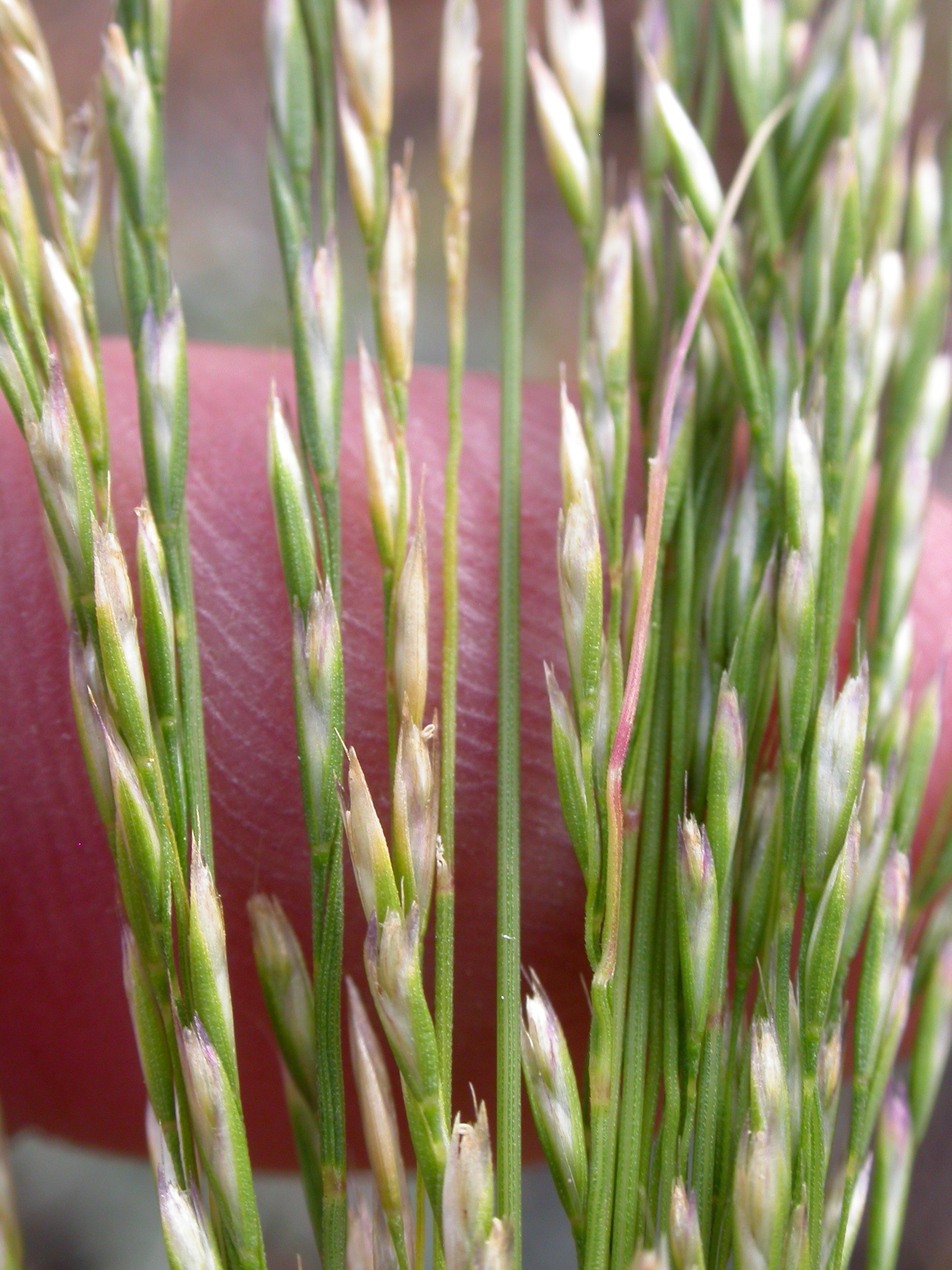
Flowering stems.
