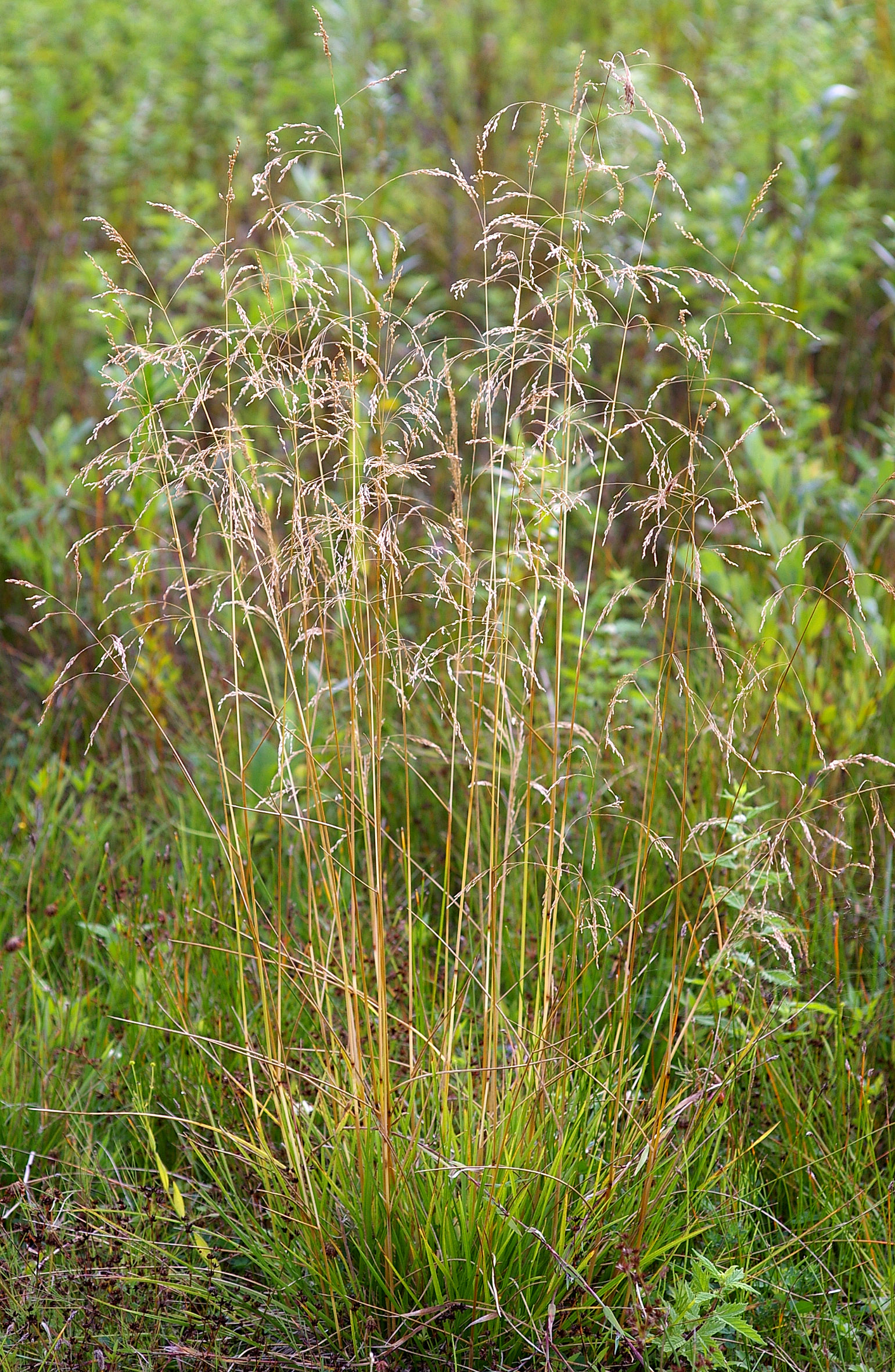
- Deschampsia cespitosa

Scientific classification
- Kingdom: Plantae
- Clade: Embryophytes
- Clade: Tracheophytes
- Clade: Angiosperms
- Clade: Monocots
- Clade: Commelinids
- Order: Poales
- Family: Poaceae
- Subfamily: Pooideae
- Supertribe: Poodae
- Tribe: Poeae
- Subtribe: Aristaveninae; F.Albers & Butzin
- Genus: Deschampsia; P.Beauv.

Type species
- Deschampsia cespitosa (L.) P.Beauv.

Synonyms
- Airidium Steud.; Aristavena F.Albers & Butzin; Campella Link; Czerniaevia Turcz. ex Griseb.; Erioblastus Honda ex Nakai; Monandraira É.Desv.; Podionapus Dulac; Scribneria Hack.

= Deschampsia =

Genus of flowering plants in the grass family

Deschampsia is a genus of plants in the grass family Poaceae, commonly known as hair grass or tussock grass. The genus is widespread across many countries.

The genus is named for French physician and naturalist Louis Auguste Deschamps (1765–1842).

Deschampsia species are used as food plants by the larvae of some species of Lepidoptera, including antler moth, the clay, clouded-bordered brindle, common wainscot, dark arches, dusky brocade, shoulder-striped wainscot, smoky wainscot and wall.

Deschampsia sometimes grow in boggy acidic formations, an example of which is the Portlethen Moss, Scotland. Deschampsia antarctica is the world's most southern monocot, and one of only two flowering plants of Antarctica.

Some species, such as D. cespitosa, are grown as ornamental garden plants.

== Species ==
As of November 2024, Plants of the World Online accepted the following species:

- Deschampsia airiformis (Steud.) Benth. & Hook.f. ex B.D.Jacks. – Chile, Argentina
- Deschampsia ampliflora (Tovar) Romasch., P.M.Peterson, Soreng & Barberá
- Deschampsia amurensis Prob.
- Deschampsia angusta Stapf & C.E.Hubb. – Zaire, Kenya, Uganda
- Deschampsia antarctica E.Desv. – Chile, Argentina, Antarctica, Falkland Islands, South Georgia, Crozet Islands, Heard-McDonald Islands, Kerguelen Islands, South Sandwich Islands
- Deschampsia argentea Lowe – Azores, Madeira, Canary Islands
- Deschampsia aurea (Munro ex Wedd.) Saarela
- Deschampsia baicalensis Tzvelev – Irkutsk
- Deschampsia barkalovii Prob. & Tzvelev
- Deschampsia berteroniana (Kunth) F.Meigen – Chile, Argentina
- Deschampsia bolanderi (Thurb.) Saarela, syn. Scribneria bolanderi
- Deschampsia boyacensis (Swallen & García-Barr.) Romasch., P.M.Peterson, Soreng & Barberá
- Deschampsia cespitosa (L.) P.Beauv. (including Deschampsia bottnica (Wahlenb.) Trin.) – Kvarken Archipelago (part of Finland)
- Deschampsia chapmanii Petrie – New Zealand incl Antipodes, Macquarie Islands
- Deschampsia christophersenii C.E.Hubb. – Tristan da Cunha
- Deschampsia chrysantha (J.Presl) Saarela
- Deschampsia chrysostachya (É.Desv.) Romasch., P.M.Peterson, Soreng & Barberá
- Deschampsia cordillerarum Hauman – Chile, Argentina
- Deschampsia danthonioides (Trin.) Munro – Annual hairgrass – Alaska, Yukon, British Columbia, western USA, Mexico
- Deschampsia deminutospicatae Charit.
- Deschampsia domingensis Hitchc. & Ekman
- Deschampsia elongata (Hook.) Munro – Chile, Argentina, United States including Alaska, Canada, Mexico
- Deschampsia eminens (J.Presl) Saarela
- Deschampsia gallaecica (Cervi & Romo) Cires, Cuesta, Nava, García-Suárez, Fern.-Carv. & Fern.Priet
- Deschampsia gayana (Steud.) Romasch., P.M.Peterson, Soreng & Barberá
- Deschampsia gracillima Kirk New Zealand including Antipodes, Tasmania
- Deschampsia gulariantzii Prob. & Tzvelev
- Deschampsia hackelii (Lillo ex Stuck.) Saarela
- Deschampsia hultenii Prob., Tzvelev & Chiapella
- Deschampsia ircutica Tzvelev & Prob.
- Deschampsia kingii (Hook.f.) É.Desv. – Chile, Argentina
- Deschampsia klossii Ridl. – Lesser Sunda Islands, New Guinea
- Deschampsia koelerioides Regel – Siberia, Central Asia, China, Mongolia, Afghanistan, Pakistan
- Deschampsia komandorensis Prob.
- Deschampsia laguriensis Prob. & Tzvelev
- Deschampsia laxa Phil. – Chile, Argentina
- Deschampsia leskovii Tzvelev – northern European Russia
- Deschampsia liebmanniana (E.Fourn.) Hitchc. – Mexico
- Deschampsia looseriana Parodi – Chile
- Deschampsia magadanica Tzvelev & Prob.
- Deschampsia media (Gouan) Roem. & Schult. – central and southern Europe, Morocco, Caucasus
- Deschampsia mejlandii C.E.Hubb. – Tristan da Cunha
- Deschampsia mendocina Parodi – Argentina
- Deschampsia mildbraedii Pilg. – Cameroon
- Deschampsia nubigena Hillebr. – Hawaii
- Deschampsia ovata (J.Presl) Saarela
- Deschampsia parvula (Hook.f.) É.Desv. – Chile, Argentina, Falkland Islands, Anvers Island
- Deschampsia patula (Phil.) Skottsb. – Chile, Argentina
- Deschampsia podophora (Pilg.) Saarela
- Deschampsia pseudokoelerioides Prob. & Tzvelev
- Deschampsia pusilla Petrie – New Zealand South Island
- Deschampsia robusta C.E.Hubb. – Tristan da Cunha
- Deschampsia sajanensis Prob. & Tzvelev
- Deschampsia santamartensis Sylvester & Soreng
- Deschampsia seledetzii Tzvelev & Prob.
- Deschampsia setacea (Huds.) Hack. – northern and western Europe
- Deschampsia shiretokoensis Tzvelev & Prob.
- Deschampsia shumshuensis Prob. & Tzvelev
- Deschampsia sichotensis Prob., Tzvelev & Chiapella
- Deschampsia susumanica Prob. & Chiapella
- Deschampsia tenella Petrie – New Zealand
- Deschampsia teretifolia (Laegaard) Romasch., P.M.Peterson, Soreng & Barberá
- Deschampsia venustula Parodi – Chile, Argentina
- Deschampsia wacei C.E.Hubb. – Tristan da Cunha

== Formerly included ==
Deschampsia formerly included many species now placed in other genera, such as Aira, Antinoria, Bromus, Calamagrostis, Centropodia, Colpodium, Dissanthelium, Holcus, Periballia, Peyritschia, Poa, Trisetum and Vahlodea.

- Deschampsia flexuosa (L.) Trin, syn. of Avenella flexuosa (L.) Drejer – Eurasia, alpine areas in Africa; northern North America, southern South America, Falkland Islands
