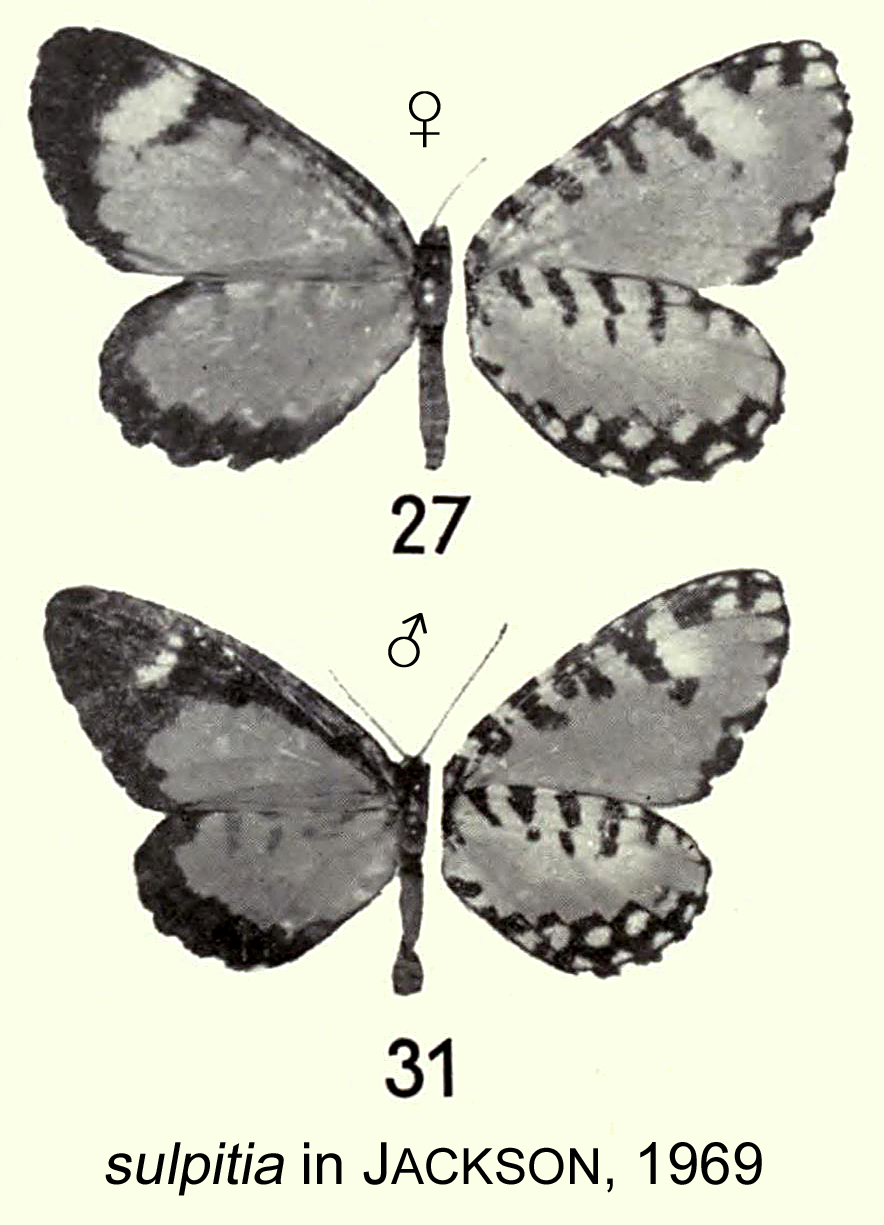

Scientific classification
- Kingdom: Animalia
- Phylum: Arthropoda
- Class: Insecta
- Order: Lepidoptera
- Family: Lycaenidae
- Genus: Telipna
- Species: T. sulpitia

Binomial name
- Telipna sulpitia Hulstaert, 1924

= Telipna sulpitia =

Species of butterfly

Telipna sulpitia is a butterfly in the family Lycaenidae. It is found in the north-eastern part of the Democratic Republic of the Congo, southern Sudan and north-western Uganda.
