= Xenodice =

Xenodice may refer to:

- Xenodice (mythology), various characters in Greek mythology

In biology:

- Xenodice, an amphipod genus in the family Podoceridae
- Cyanopepla xenodice, a moth species in the family Erebidae
