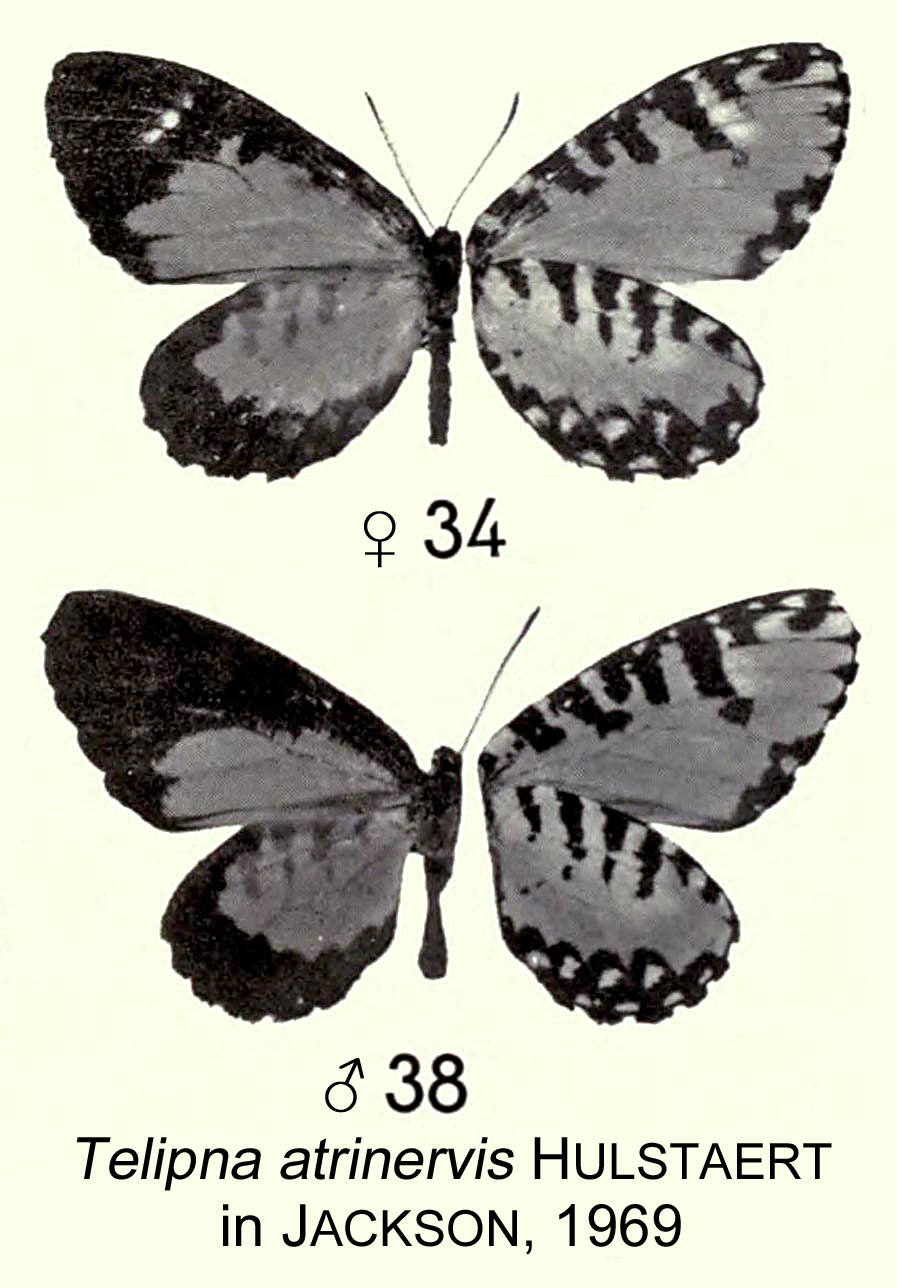

Scientific classification
- Kingdom: Animalia
- Phylum: Arthropoda
- Class: Insecta
- Order: Lepidoptera
- Family: Lycaenidae
- Genus: Telipna
- Species: T. atrinervis

Binomial name
- Telipna atrinervis Hulstaert, 1924

Synonyms
- Telipna venanigra Bethune-Baker, 1926

= Telipna atrinervis =

Species of butterfly

Telipna atrinervis is a butterfly in the family Lycaenidae. It is found in Cameroon, Equatorial Guinea, the Republic of the Congo, Gabon and the Central African Republic.
