= Cyanopepla dognini =

Scientific classification
- Domain: Eukaryota
- Kingdom: Animalia
- Phylum: Arthropoda
- Class: Insecta
- Order: Lepidoptera
- Superfamily: Noctuoidea
- Family: Erebidae
- Subfamily: Arctiinae
- Genus: Cyanopepla
- Species: C. dognini

Binomial name
- Cyanopepla dognini Hulstaert, 1924

Species of moth

Cyanopepla dognini is a moth of the subfamily Arctiinae. It was described by Gustaaf Hulstaert in 1924. It is found in Paraguay and Brazil.
