= Metamicroptera rotundata =

Scientific classification
- Domain: Eukaryota
- Kingdom: Animalia
- Phylum: Arthropoda
- Class: Insecta
- Order: Lepidoptera
- Superfamily: Noctuoidea
- Family: Erebidae
- Subfamily: Arctiinae
- Genus: Metamicroptera
- Species: M. rotundata

Binomial name
- Metamicroptera rotundata Hulstaert, 1923

Synonyms
- Balacra paradoxa Hering, 1932; Balacra paradoxa Romieux, 1934; Metamicroptera paradoxa; Neobalacra paradoxa

Species of moth

Metamicroptera rotundata is a moth of the family Erebidae. It was described by Gustaaf Hulstaert in 1923. It is found in the Democratic Republic of the Congo, Rwanda and Zambia.
