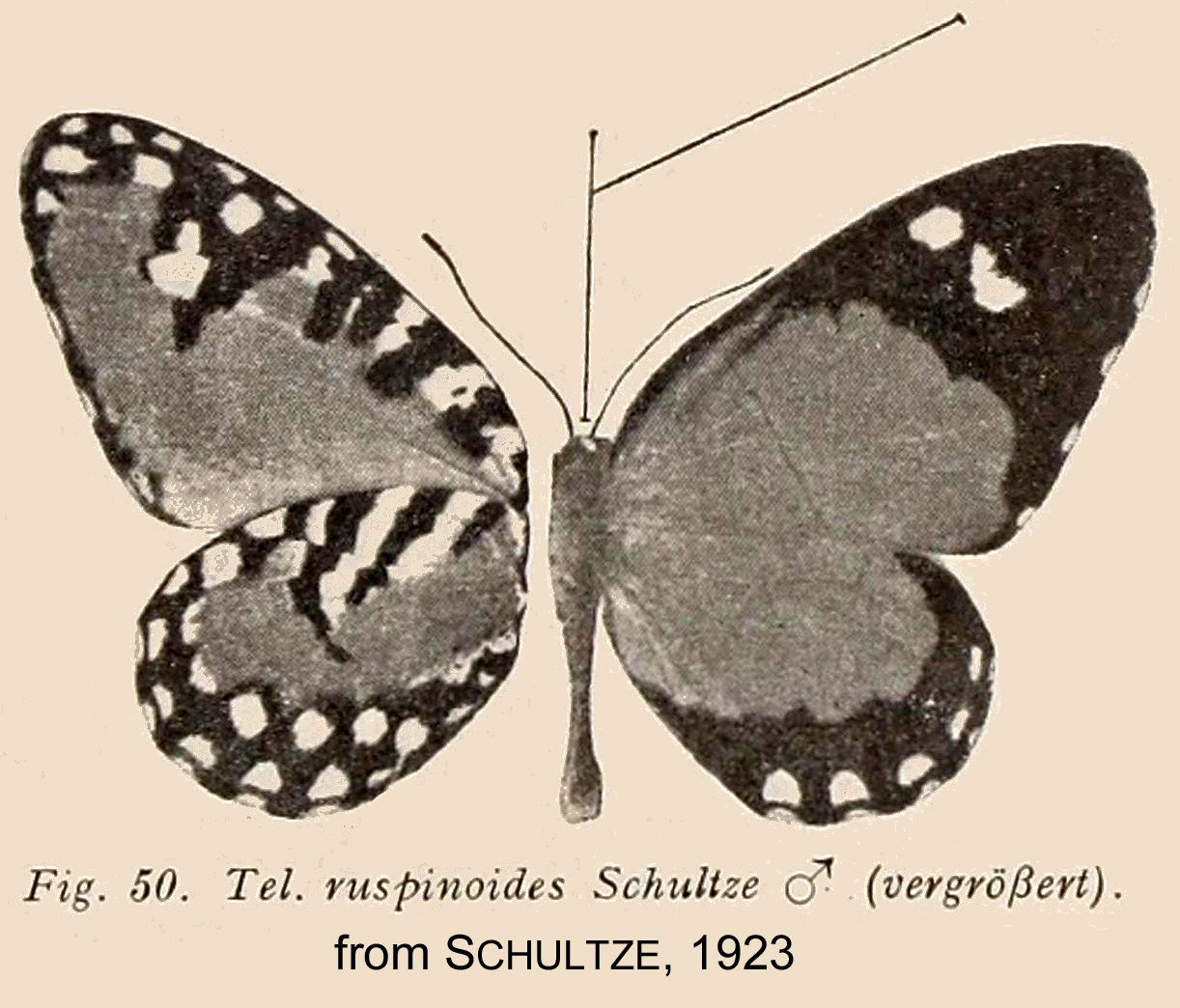

Scientific classification
- Kingdom: Animalia
- Phylum: Arthropoda
- Class: Insecta
- Order: Lepidoptera
- Family: Lycaenidae
- Genus: Telipna
- Species: T. ruspinoides

Binomial name
- Telipna ruspinoides Schultze, 1923

= Telipna ruspinoides =

Species of butterfly

Telipna ruspinoides, the ruspinoid telipna, is a butterfly in the family Lycaenidae. It is found in south-eastern Nigeria, southern Cameroon, the Republic of the Congo, Gabon and the Central African Republic. The habitat consists of forests.
