= Telipna cuypersi =

Scientific classification
- Kingdom: Animalia
- Phylum: Arthropoda
- Class: Insecta
- Order: Lepidoptera
- Family: Lycaenidae
- Genus: Telipna
- Species: T. cuypersi

Binomial name
- Telipna cuypersi Libert, 2005

Species of butterfly

Telipna cuypersi is a butterfly in the family Lycaenidae. It is found in the southern part of the Republic of the Congo, the western part of the Democratic Republic of the Congo and northern Angola.
