= Cyanopepla cinctipennis =

Scientific classification
- Kingdom: Animalia
- Phylum: Arthropoda
- Class: Insecta
- Order: Lepidoptera
- Superfamily: Noctuoidea
- Family: Erebidae
- Subfamily: Arctiinae
- Genus: Cyanopepla
- Species: C. cinctipennis

Binomial name
- Cyanopepla cinctipennis (Walker, [1865])

Synonyms
- Charidea cinctipennis Walker, [1865]; Charidea azetas Druce, 1896

Species of moth

Cyanopepla cinctipennis is a moth of the subfamily Arctiinae. It was described by Francis Walker in 1865. It is found in Colombia and Ecuador.
