= Cyanopepla basimacula =

Scientific classification
- Kingdom: Animalia
- Phylum: Arthropoda
- Class: Insecta
- Order: Lepidoptera
- Superfamily: Noctuoidea
- Family: Erebidae
- Subfamily: Arctiinae
- Genus: Cyanopepla
- Species: C. basimacula

Binomial name
- Cyanopepla basimacula Hampson, 1898

Species of moth

Cyanopepla basimacula is a moth of the subfamily Arctiinae. It was described by George Hampson in 1898. It is found in the Amazon region.
