= Butterfly barb =

Conservation status
- Least Concern (IUCN 3.1)

Scientific classification
- Domain: Eukaryota
- Kingdom: Animalia
- Phylum: Chordata
- Class: Actinopterygii
- Order: Cypriniformes
- Family: Cyprinidae
- Subfamily: Smiliogastrinae
- Genus: Enteromius
- Species: E. hulstaerti

Binomial name
- Enteromius hulstaerti (Poll, 1945)

Synonyms
- Barbus hulstaerti Poll, 1945

Species of fish

The butterfly barb (Enteromius hulstaerti) is a species of cyprinid fish in the genus Enteromius.

== Size ==
This species reaches a length of 3.5 cm (1.4 in).

== Etymology ==
The fish is named in honor of Révérend Père Gustaaf Hulstaert (1900–1990), an entomologist, botanist and missionary in the Belgian Congo, who collected the type specimen.
