= Cyanopepla bella =

Scientific classification
- Kingdom: Animalia
- Phylum: Arthropoda
- Clade: Pancrustacea
- Class: Insecta
- Order: Lepidoptera
- Superfamily: Noctuoidea
- Family: Erebidae
- Subfamily: Arctiinae
- Genus: Cyanopepla
- Species: C. bella

Binomial name
- Cyanopepla bella (Guérin-Méneville, [1844])

Synonyms
- Glaucopis bella Guérin-Méneville, [1844]; Charidea bella; Euchromia gloriosa Walker, 1854; Cyanopepla cruenta Clemens, 1861; Charidea bivulnera Grote & Robinson, 1867; Charidea haematodes Boisduval, 1870; Charidea eximia Boisduval, 1870

Species of moth

Cyanopepla bella is a moth of the subfamily Arctiinae. It was described by Félix Édouard Guérin-Méneville in 1844. It is found in Mexico, Guatemala and Honduras.
