= Telipna ja =

Scientific classification
- Kingdom: Animalia
- Phylum: Arthropoda
- Class: Insecta
- Order: Lepidoptera
- Family: Lycaenidae
- Genus: Telipna
- Species: T. ja

Binomial name
- Telipna ja Bethune-Baker, 1926

Species of butterfly

Telipna ja is a butterfly in the family Lycaenidae. It is found in Cameroon and the Republic of the Congo.
