= Cyanopepla agyrtidia =

Scientific classification
- Kingdom: Animalia
- Phylum: Arthropoda
- Class: Insecta
- Order: Lepidoptera
- Superfamily: Noctuoidea
- Family: Erebidae
- Subfamily: Arctiinae
- Genus: Cyanopepla
- Species: C. agyrtidia

Binomial name
- Cyanopepla agyrtidia Hampson, 1898

Species of moth

Cyanopepla agyrtidia is a moth of the subfamily Arctiinae. It was described by George Hampson in 1898. It is found in Bolivia and Ecuador.
