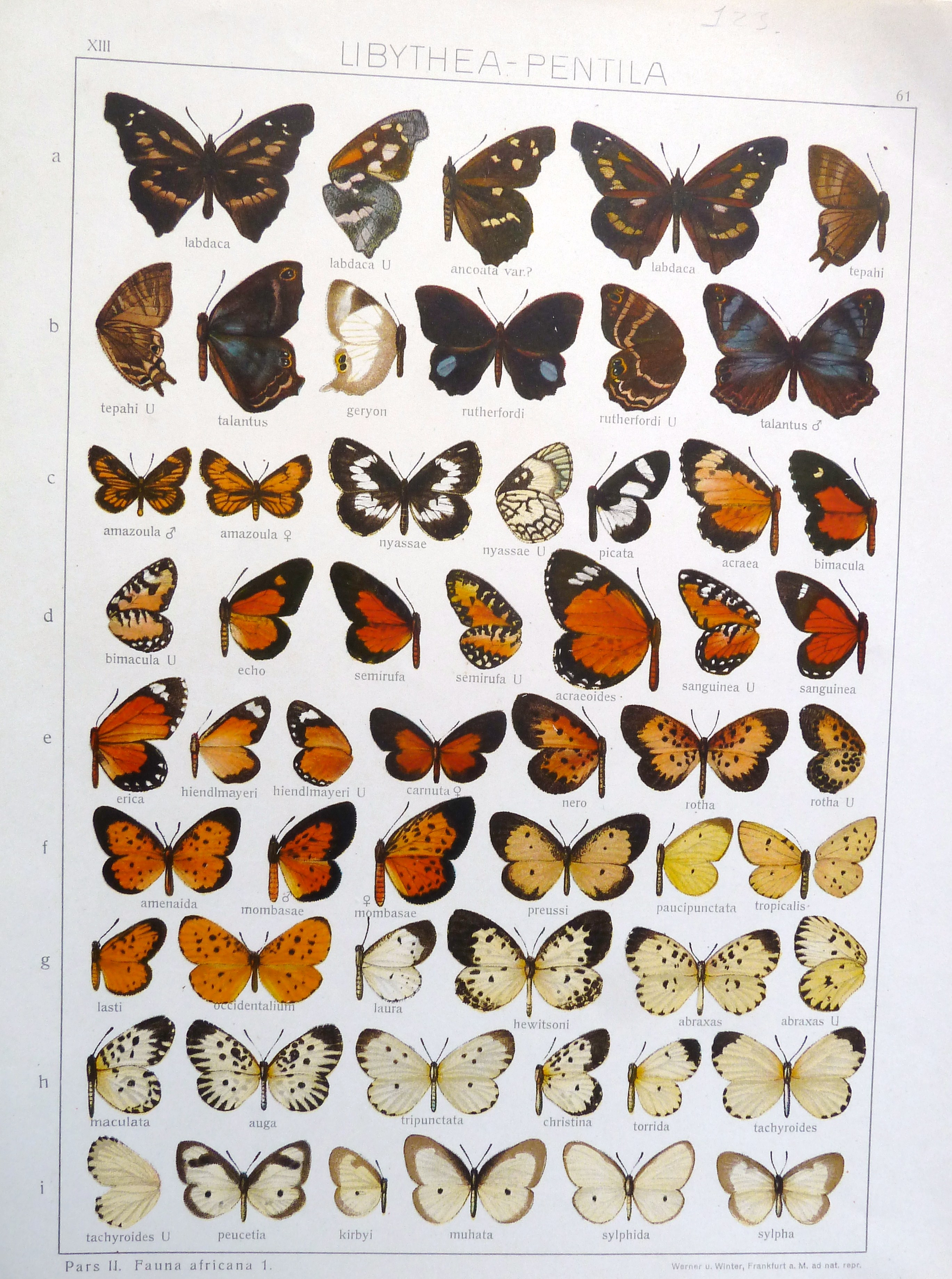
- In Adalbert Seitz's Fauna Africana

Scientific classification
- Kingdom: Animalia
- Phylum: Arthropoda
- Clade: Pancrustacea
- Class: Insecta
- Order: Lepidoptera
- Family: Lycaenidae
- Genus: Telipna
- Species: T. sanguinea

Binomial name
- Telipna sanguinea (Plötz, 1880)

Synonyms
- Pentila acraea var. sanguinea Plötz, 1880; Liptena anneckei Dewitz, 1886; Telipna sanguinea var. bistrigata Aurivillius, 1925; Telipna mariae Dufrane, 1945

= Telipna sanguinea =

Species of butterfly

Telipna sanguinea is a butterfly in the family Lycaenidae. It is found in Nigeria, Cameroon, the Republic of the Congo, Equatorial Guinea, Gabon, Angola, the Central African Republic, the Democratic Republic of the Congo, Uganda and Tanzania. Their habitat consists of forests.

Adults are similar to day-flying moths of the genus Aletis. They are on wing during the rainy season.

The larvae feed on lichens growing on the bark of tree trunks.

== Subspecies ==
- Telipna sanguinea sanguinea (eastern Nigeria, Cameroon, northern Congo, Equatorial Guinea, Gabon, Angola, Central African Republic, Democratic Republic of the Congo)
- Telipna sanguinea depuncta Talbot, 1937 (Uganda, north-western Tanzania)
