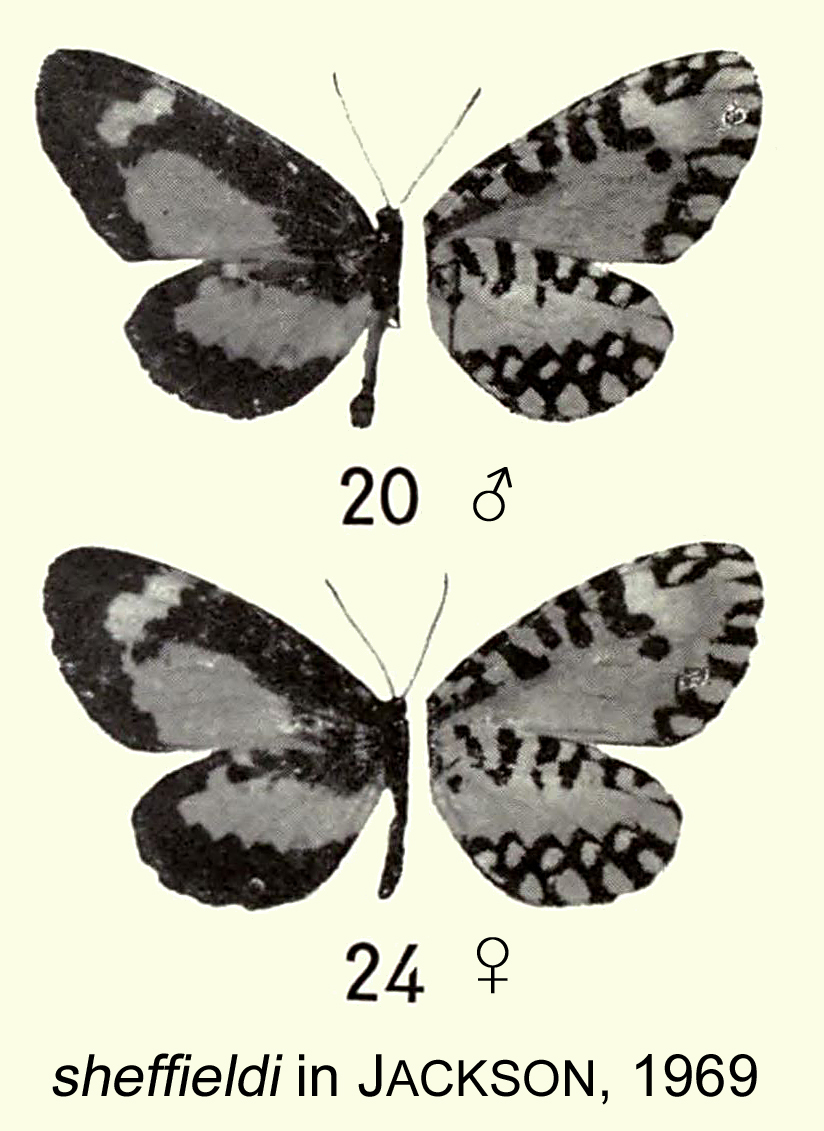

Scientific classification
- Kingdom: Animalia
- Phylum: Arthropoda
- Class: Insecta
- Order: Lepidoptera
- Family: Lycaenidae
- Genus: Telipna
- Species: T. sheffieldi

Binomial name
- Telipna sheffieldi Bethune-Baker, 1926

= Telipna sheffieldi =

Species of butterfly

Telipna sheffieldi is a butterfly in the family Lycaenidae. It is found in Uganda.
