= Cyanopepla alonzo =

Scientific classification
- Domain: Eukaryota
- Kingdom: Animalia
- Phylum: Arthropoda
- Class: Insecta
- Order: Lepidoptera
- Superfamily: Noctuoidea
- Family: Erebidae
- Subfamily: Arctiinae
- Genus: Cyanopepla
- Species: C. alonzo

Binomial name
- Cyanopepla alonzo (Butler, 1876)

Synonyms
- Charidea alonzo Butler, 1876; Charidea imogena Butler, 1876

Species of moth

Cyanopepla alonzo is a moth of the subfamily Arctiinae. It was described by Arthur Gardiner Butler in 1876. It is found in Colombia, Venezuela and Peru.
