= Cyanopepla obscura =

Scientific classification
- Domain: Eukaryota
- Kingdom: Animalia
- Phylum: Arthropoda
- Class: Insecta
- Order: Lepidoptera
- Superfamily: Noctuoidea
- Family: Erebidae
- Subfamily: Arctiinae
- Genus: Cyanopepla
- Species: C. obscura

Binomial name
- Cyanopepla obscura H. Druce, 1898

Species of moth

Cyanopepla obscura is a moth of the subfamily Arctiinae. It was described by Herbert Druce in 1898. It is found in Peru.
