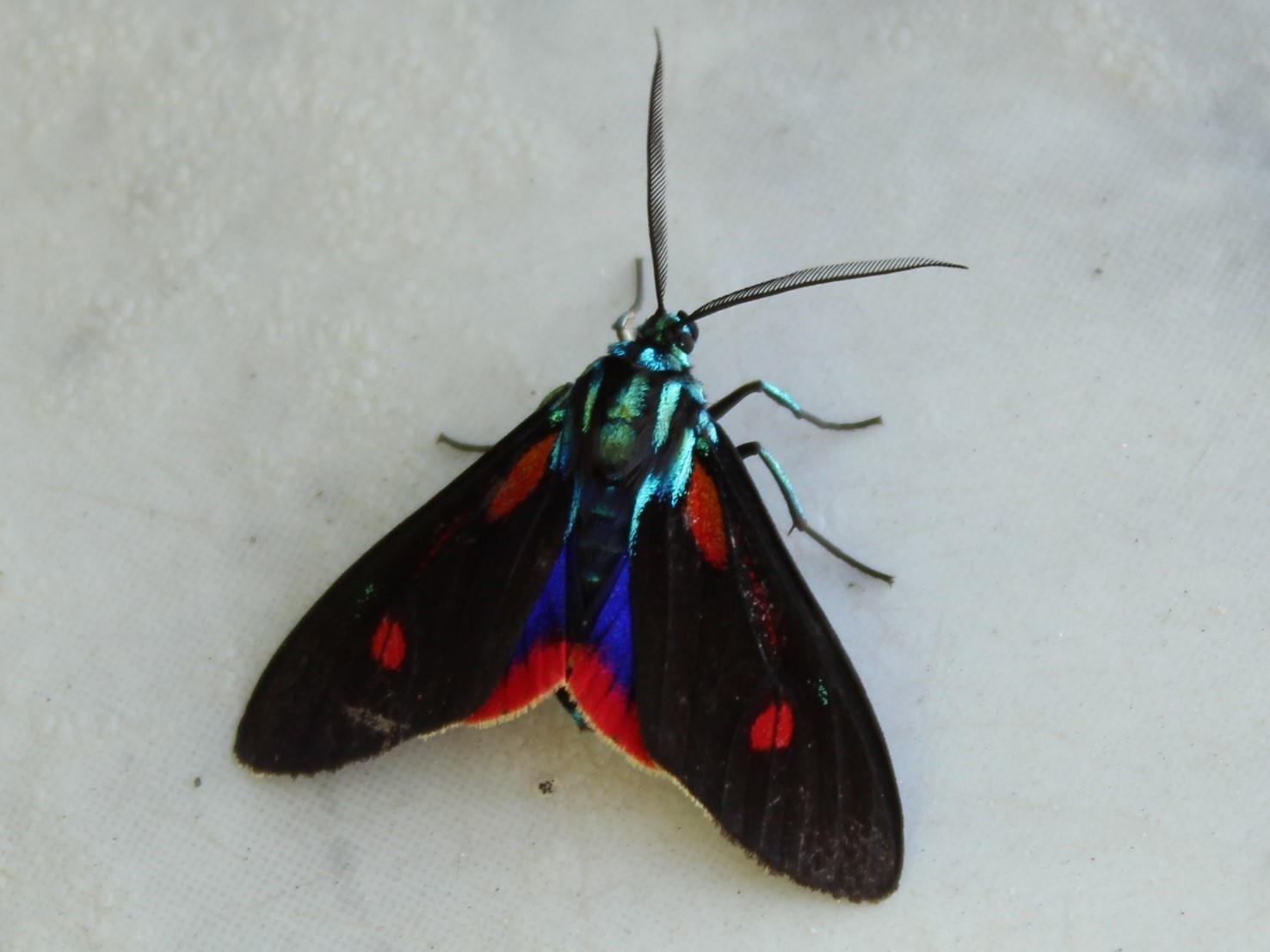

Scientific classification
- Domain: Eukaryota
- Kingdom: Animalia
- Phylum: Arthropoda
- Class: Insecta
- Order: Lepidoptera
- Superfamily: Noctuoidea
- Family: Erebidae
- Subfamily: Arctiinae
- Genus: Cyanopepla
- Species: C. micans

Binomial name
- Cyanopepla micans (Herrich-Schäffer, [1854])

Synonyms
- Charidea micans Herrich-Schäffer, [1854]; Charidea fulgens Herrich-Schäffer, [1854]

= Cyanopepla micans =

Species of moth

Cyanopepla micans is a moth of the subfamily Arctiinae. It was described by Gottlieb August Wilhelm Herrich-Schäffer in 1854. It is found in Colombia and Venezuela.
