= Cyanopepla buckleyi =

Scientific classification
- Domain: Eukaryota
- Kingdom: Animalia
- Phylum: Arthropoda
- Class: Insecta
- Order: Lepidoptera
- Superfamily: Noctuoidea
- Family: Erebidae
- Subfamily: Arctiinae
- Genus: Cyanopepla
- Species: C. buckleyi

Binomial name
- Cyanopepla buckleyi (H. Druce, 1883)

Synonyms
- Charidea buckleyi H. Druce, 1883

Species of moth

Cyanopepla buckleyi is a moth of the subfamily Arctiinae. It was described by Herbert Druce in 1883. It is found in Ecuador and Bolivia.
