= Telipna centralis =

Scientific classification
- Kingdom: Animalia
- Phylum: Arthropoda
- Class: Insecta
- Order: Lepidoptera
- Family: Lycaenidae
- Genus: Telipna
- Species: T. centralis

Binomial name
- Telipna centralis Libert, 2005

Species of butterfly

Telipna centralis is a butterfly in the family Lycaenidae. It is found in the Democratic Republic of the Congo.
