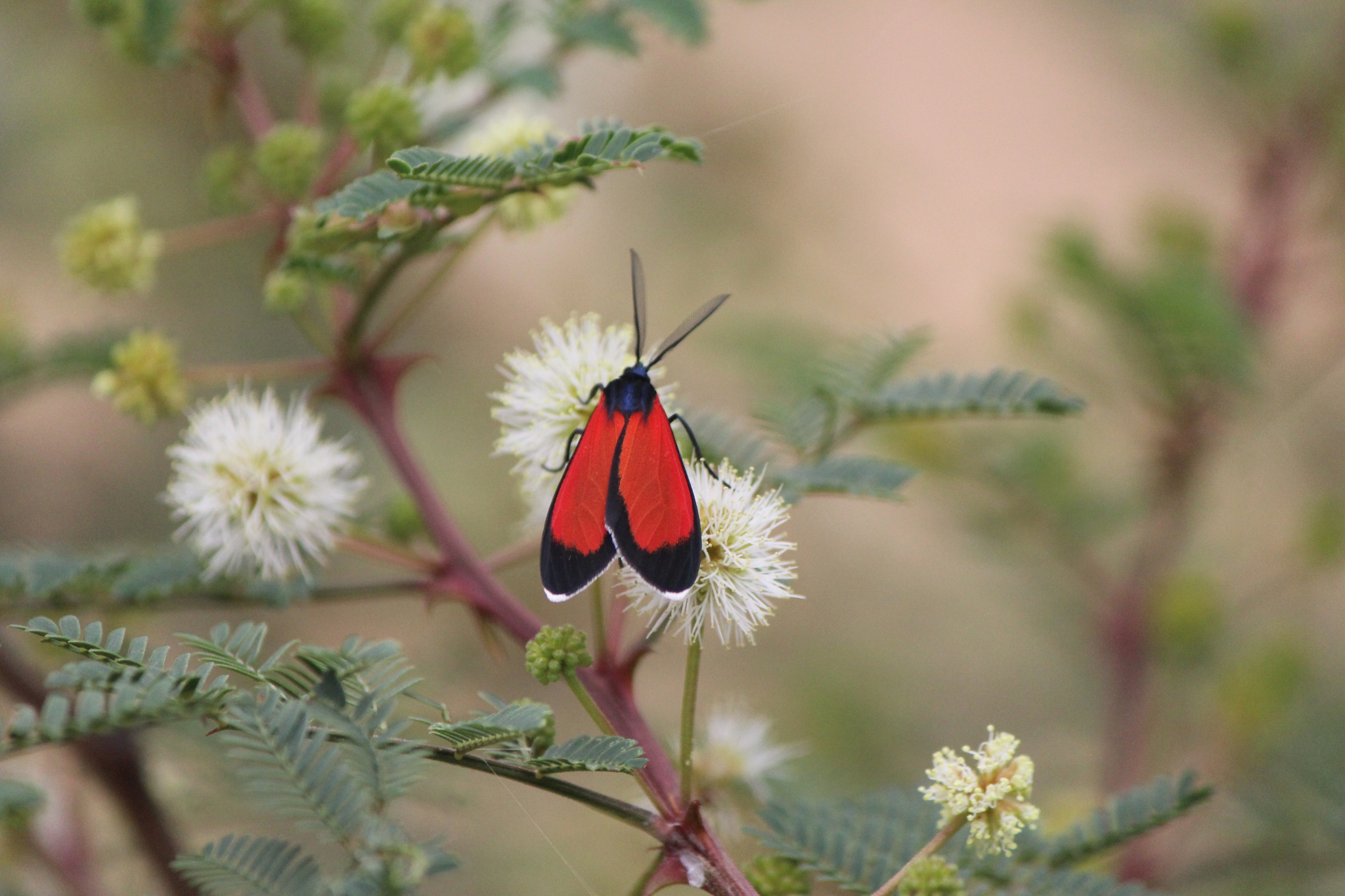

Scientific classification
- Domain: Eukaryota
- Kingdom: Animalia
- Phylum: Arthropoda
- Class: Insecta
- Order: Lepidoptera
- Superfamily: Noctuoidea
- Family: Erebidae
- Subfamily: Arctiinae
- Genus: Cyanopepla
- Species: C. griseldis

Binomial name
- Cyanopepla griseldis (H. Druce, 1884)

Synonyms
- Charidea griseldis H. Druce, 1884

= Cyanopepla griseldis =

Species of moth

Cyanopepla griseldis is a moth of the subfamily Arctiinae. It was described by Herbert Druce in 1884. It is found in Mexico.
