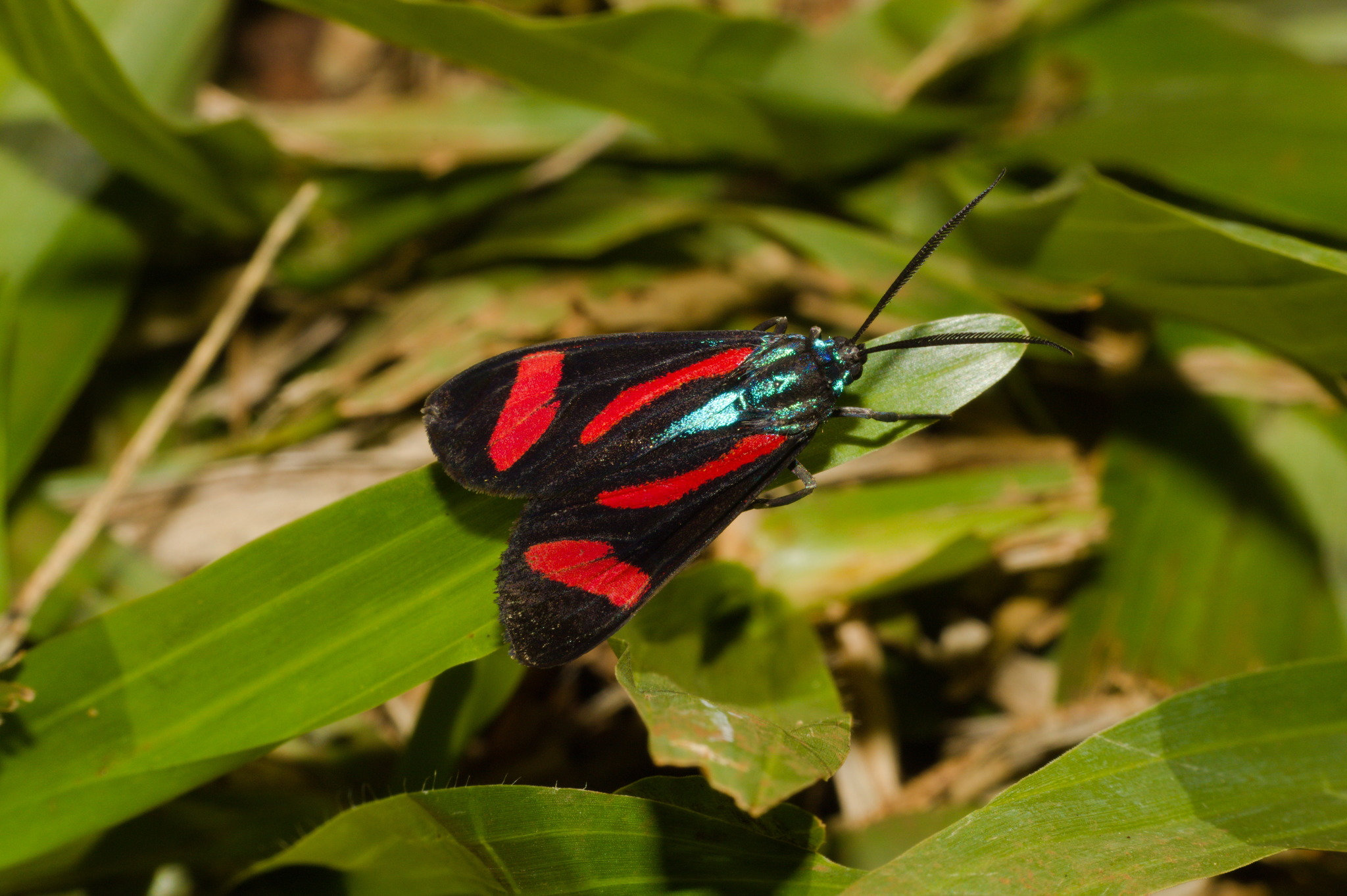

Scientific classification
- Kingdom: Animalia
- Phylum: Arthropoda
- Class: Insecta
- Order: Lepidoptera
- Superfamily: Noctuoidea
- Family: Erebidae
- Subfamily: Arctiinae
- Genus: Cyanopepla
- Species: C. jucunda

Binomial name
- Cyanopepla jucunda (Walker, 1854)

Synonyms
- Euchromia jucunda Walker, 1854; Charidea fastuosa Ménétriés, 1857

= Cyanopepla jucunda =

Species of moth

Cyanopepla jucunda is a moth of the subfamily Arctiinae. It was described by Francis Walker in 1854. It is found in the Brazilian states of Rio de Janeiro and Espírito Santo and in Argentina.
