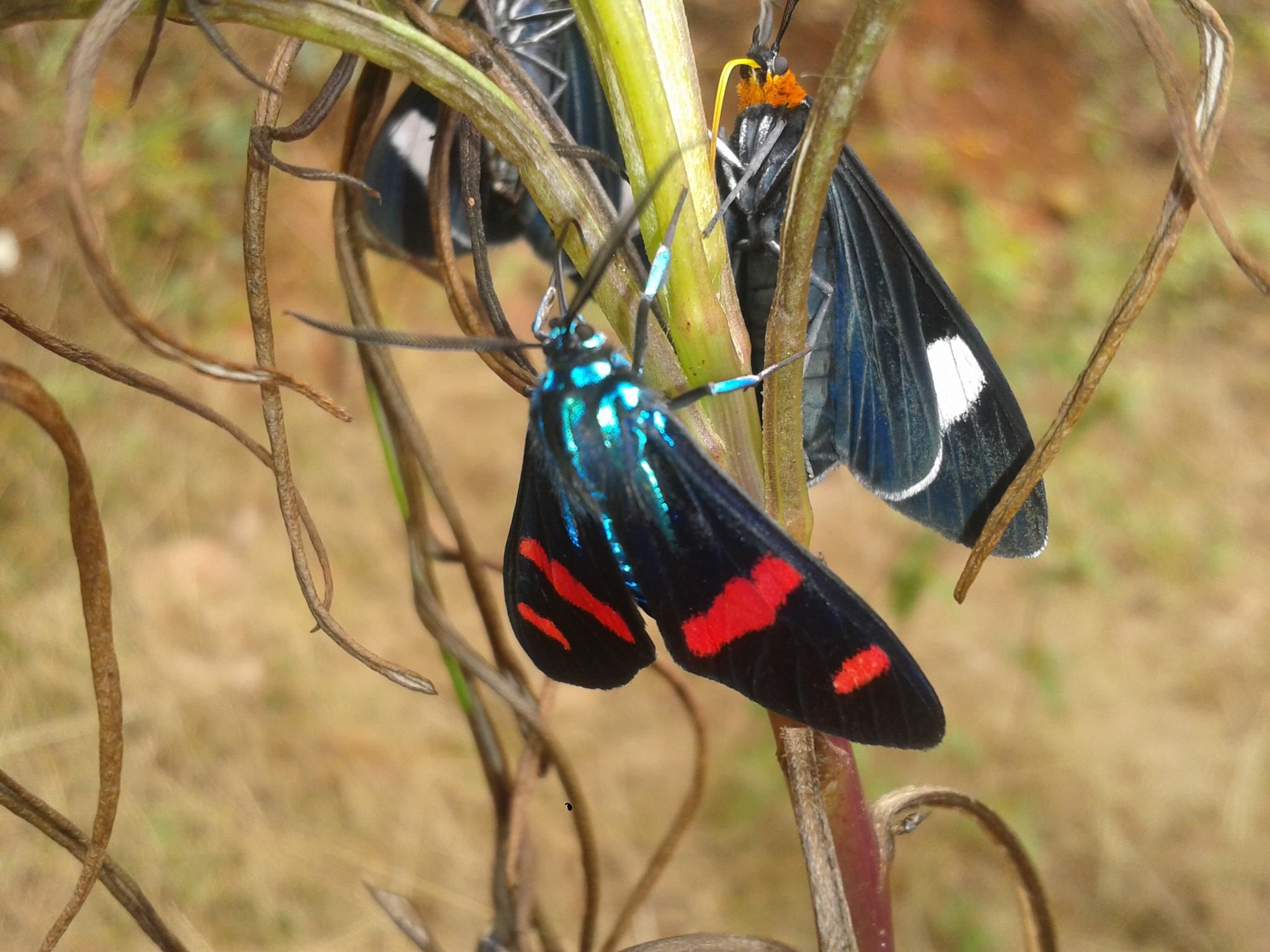

Scientific classification
- Domain: Eukaryota
- Kingdom: Animalia
- Phylum: Arthropoda
- Class: Insecta
- Order: Lepidoptera
- Superfamily: Noctuoidea
- Family: Erebidae
- Subfamily: Arctiinae
- Genus: Cyanopepla; Clemens, 1861

Synonyms
- Automolis Walker, 1854 (preocc.)

= Cyanopepla =

Genus of moths

Cyanopepla is a genus of moths in the subfamily Arctiinae. The genus was erected by James Brackenridge Clemens in 1861.

== Species ==
- Cyanopepla agyrtidia Hampson, 1898
- Cyanopepla alonzo (Butler, 1876)
- Cyanopepla amata (Druce, 1890)
- Cyanopepla arrogans (Walker, 1854)
- Cyanopepla basimacula Hampson, 1898
- Cyanopepla bella (Guérin-Méneville, [1844])
- Cyanopepla bertha (Druce, 1883)
- Cyanopepla buckleyi (Druce, 1883)
- Cyanopepla chelidon (Druce, 1893)
- Cyanopepla chloe (Druce, 1883)
- Cyanopepla cinctipennis (Walker, [1865])
- Cyanopepla dognini Hulstaert, 1924
- Cyanopepla fastuosa (Walker, 1854)
- Cyanopepla glaucopoides (Walker, 1854)
- Cyanopepla griseldis (Druce, 1884)
- Cyanopepla hurama (Butler, 1876)
- Cyanopepla imperialis (Druce, 1883)
- Cyanopepla jalifa (Boisduval, 1870)
- Cyanopepla jucunda (Walker, 1854)
- Cyanopepla julia (Druce, 1883)
- Cyanopepla lystra (Druce, 1896)
- Cyanopepla masia (Dognin, 1889)
- Cyanopepla micans (Herrich-Schäffer, [1854])
- Cyanopepla obscura Druce, 1898
- Cyanopepla panamensis (Druce, 1884)
- Cyanopepla perilla (Druce, 1883)
- Cyanopepla phoenicia Hampson, 1898
- Cyanopepla pretiosa (Burmeister, 1880)
- Cyanopepla quadricolor Felder, 1874
- Cyanopepla ribbei (Druce, 1885)
- Cyanopepla scintillans (Butler, 1872)
- Cyanopepla similis (Heylaerts, 1890)
- Cyanopepla submacula (Walker, 1854)
- Cyanopepla xenodice (Druce, 1884)
