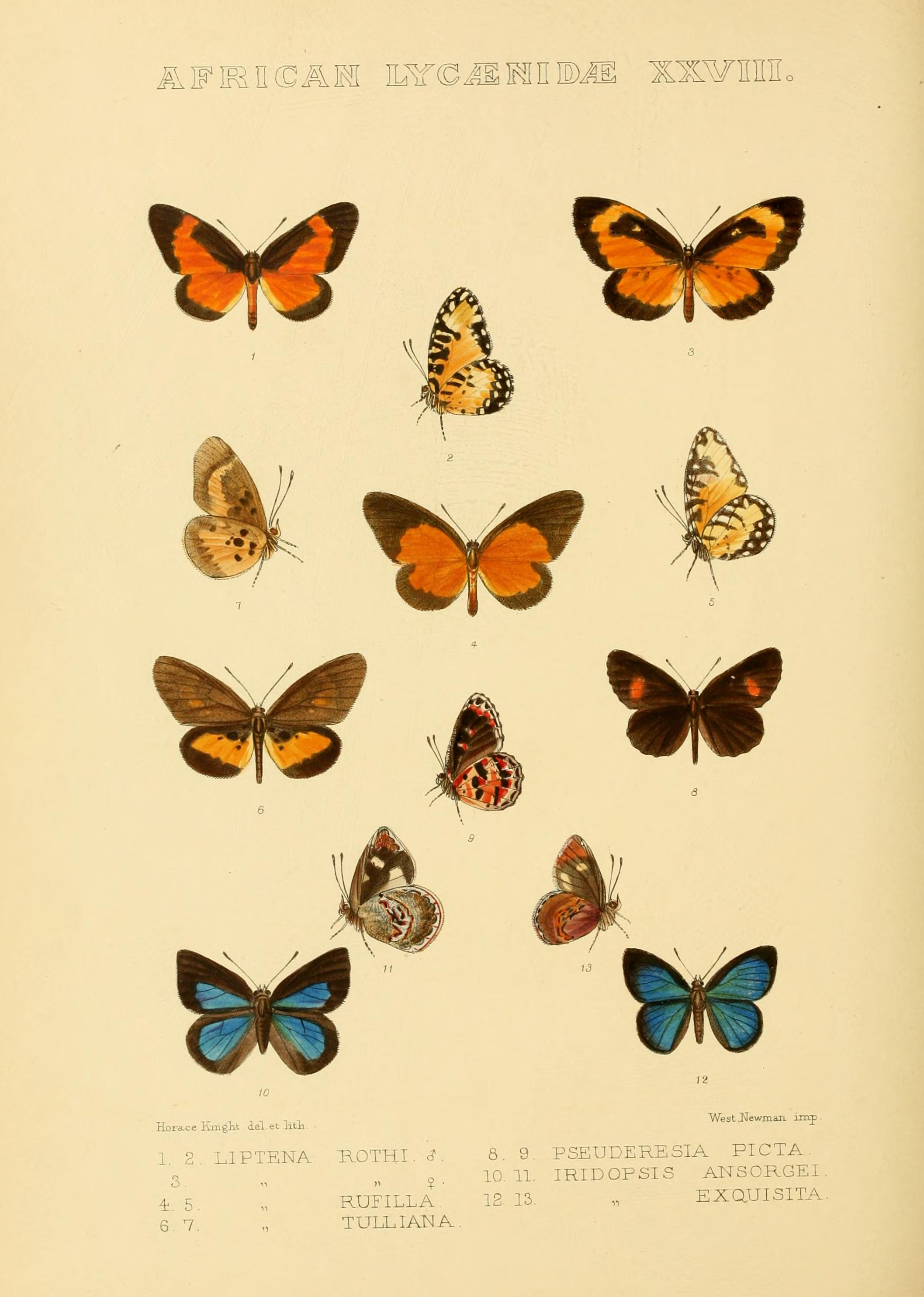
- Figures 4 and 5

Scientific classification
- Kingdom: Animalia
- Phylum: Arthropoda
- Class: Insecta
- Order: Lepidoptera
- Family: Lycaenidae
- Genus: Telipna
- Species: T. rufilla

Binomial name
- Telipna rufilla (Grose-Smith, 1901)

Synonyms
- Liptena rufilla Grose-Smith, 1901

= Telipna rufilla =

Species of butterfly

Telipna rufilla, the Niger Delta telipna, is a butterfly in the family Lycaenidae. It is found in Nigeria. The habitat consists of forests.
