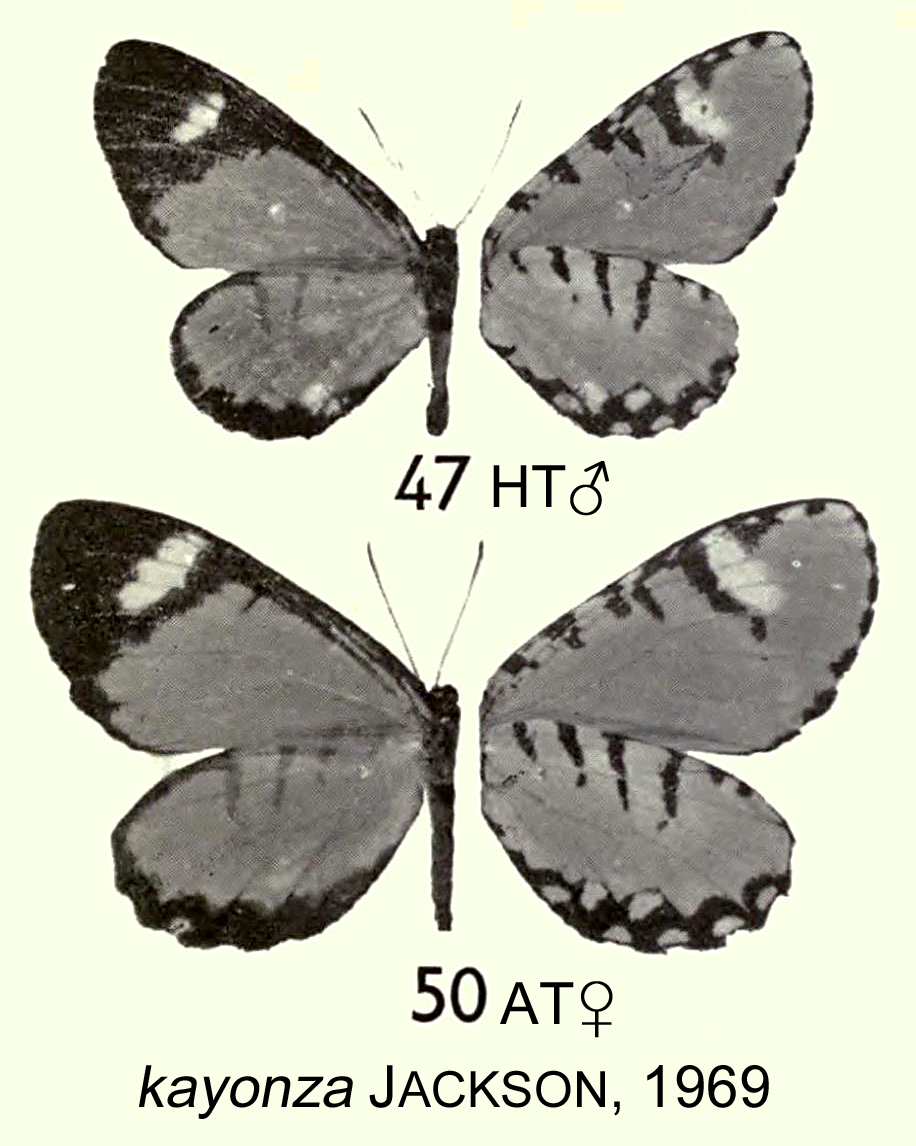

Scientific classification
- Kingdom: Animalia
- Phylum: Arthropoda
- Class: Insecta
- Order: Lepidoptera
- Family: Lycaenidae
- Genus: Telipna
- Species: T. kayonza

Binomial name
- Telipna kayonza Jackson, 1969

= Telipna kayonza =

Species of butterfly

Telipna kayonza is a butterfly in the family Lycaenidae. It is found in south-western Uganda.
