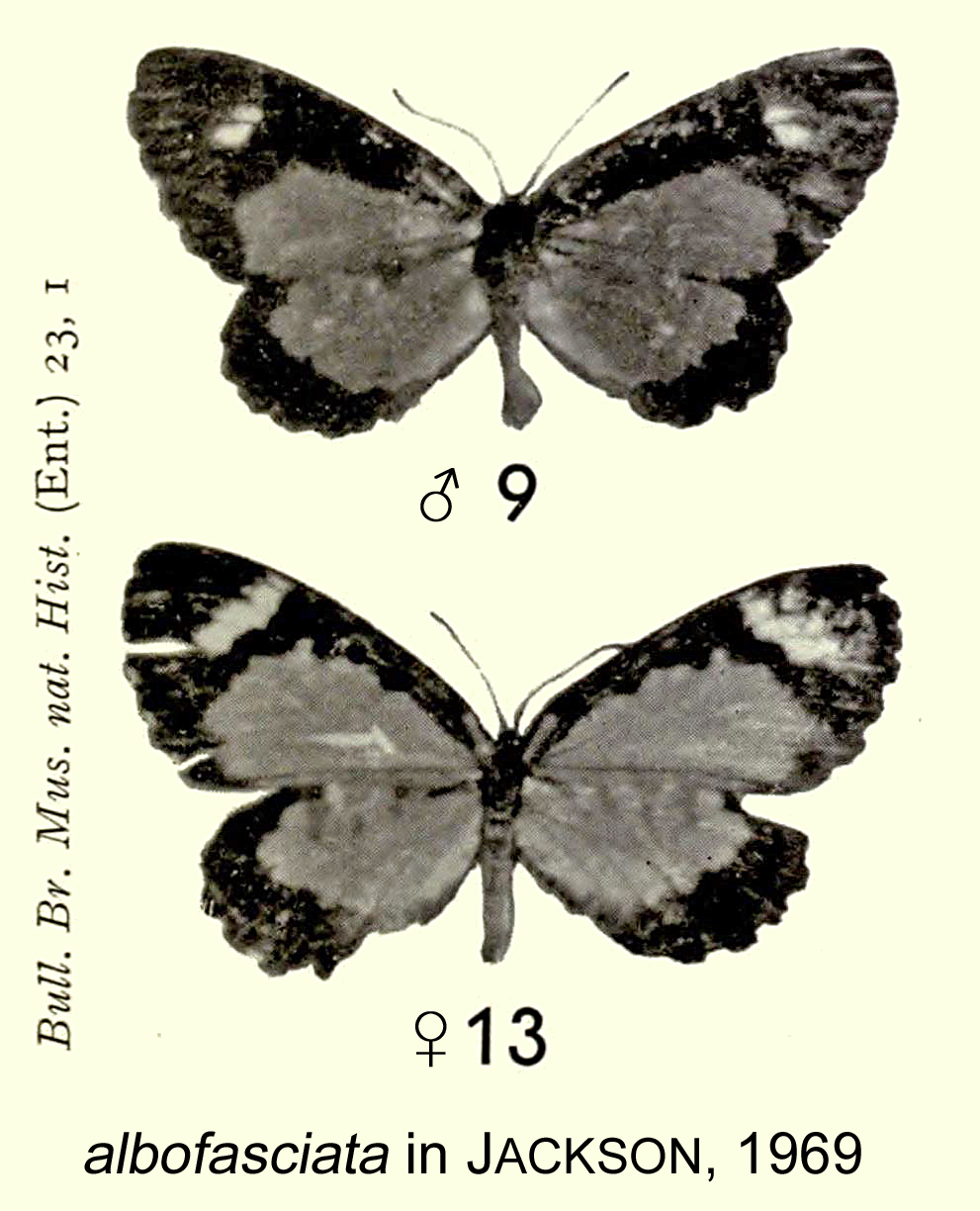

Scientific classification
- Kingdom: Animalia
- Phylum: Arthropoda
- Class: Insecta
- Order: Lepidoptera
- Family: Lycaenidae
- Genus: Telipna
- Species: T. albofasciata

Binomial name
- Telipna albofasciata Aurivillius, 1910

Synonyms
- Telipna acraeoides laplumei Devos, 1917; Telipna lotti Jackson, 1969

= Telipna albofasciata =

Species of butterfly

Telipna albofasciata is a butterfly in the family Lycaenidae. It is found in Nigeria, Cameroon, Equatorial Guinea, the Republic of the Congo, Gabon, Angola, the Central African Republic, the Democratic Republic of the Congo and Sudan.

== Subspecies ==
- Telipna albofasciata albofasciata (south-eastern Nigeria, Cameroon, Equatorial Guinea, Congo, Gabon, Angola, Central African Republic, western Democratic Republic of the Congo)
- Telipna albofasciata laplumei Devos, 1917 (northern Democratic Republic of the Congo, southern Sudan)
