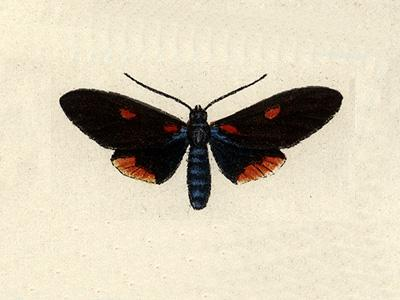

Scientific classification
- Kingdom: Animalia
- Phylum: Arthropoda
- Class: Insecta
- Order: Lepidoptera
- Superfamily: Noctuoidea
- Family: Erebidae
- Subfamily: Arctiinae
- Genus: Cyanopepla
- Species: C. fastuosa

Binomial name
- Cyanopepla fastuosa (Walker, 1854)

Synonyms
- Euchromia fastuosa Walker, 1854; Charidea fulgida Herrich-Schäffer, [1854]

= Cyanopepla fastuosa =

Species of moth

Cyanopepla fastuosa is a moth of the subfamily Arctiinae first described by Francis Walker in 1854. It is found in Venezuela and Brazil and on Jamaica.
