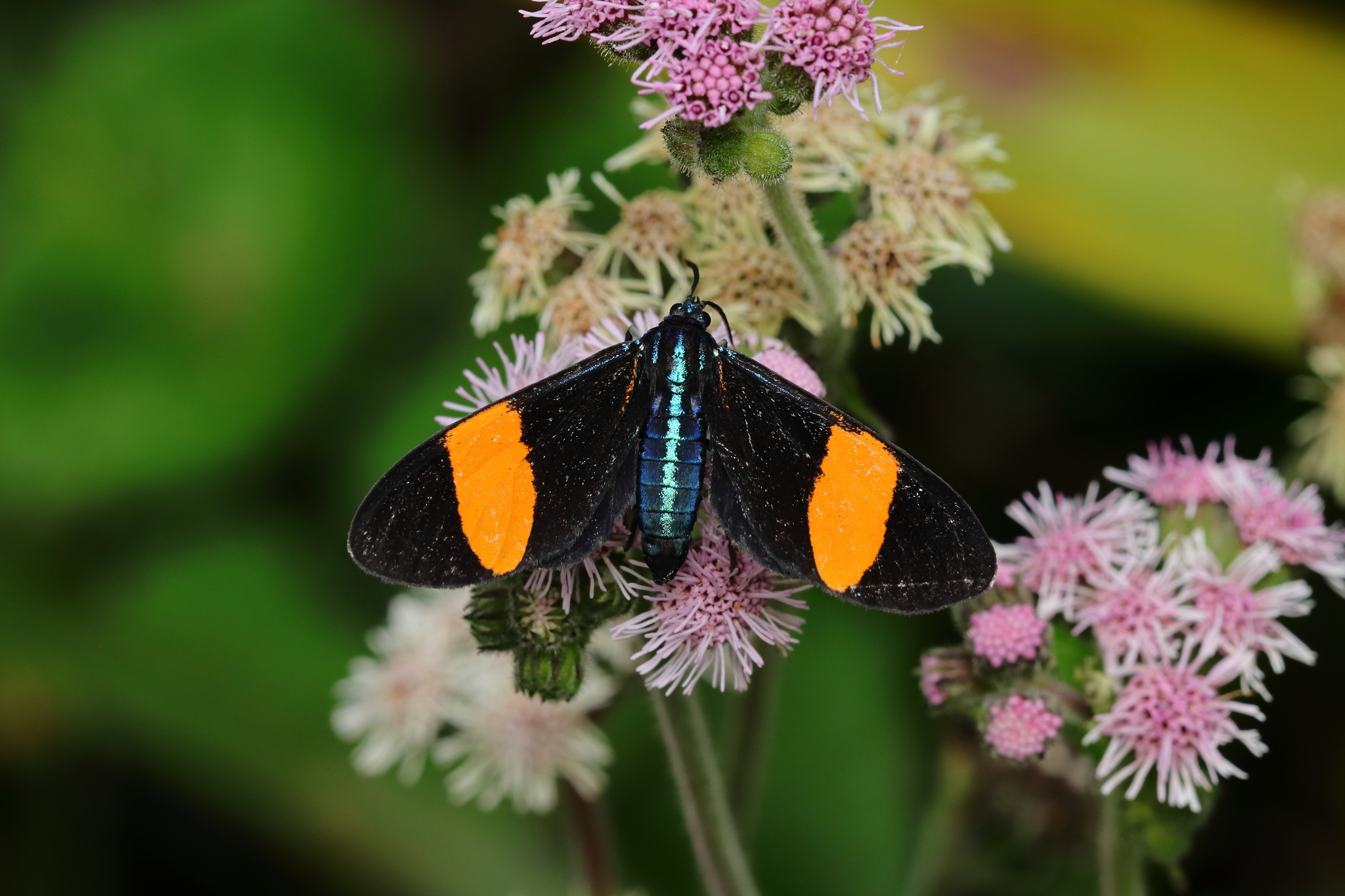

Scientific classification
- Domain: Eukaryota
- Kingdom: Animalia
- Phylum: Arthropoda
- Class: Insecta
- Order: Lepidoptera
- Superfamily: Noctuoidea
- Family: Erebidae
- Subfamily: Arctiinae
- Genus: Cyanopepla
- Species: C. similis

Binomial name
- Cyanopepla similis (Heylaerts, 1890)

Synonyms
- Charidia similis Heylaerts, 1890; Charidea orbona Druce, 1893

= Cyanopepla similis =

Species of moth

Cyanopepla similis is a moth of the subfamily Arctiinae. It was described by Franciscus J. M. Heylaerts in 1890. It is found in Santa Catarina, Brazil.
