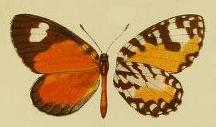

Scientific classification
- Kingdom: Animalia
- Phylum: Arthropoda
- Class: Insecta
- Order: Lepidoptera
- Family: Lycaenidae
- Genus: Telipna
- Species: T. transverstigma

Binomial name
- Telipna transverstigma Druce, 1910

= Telipna transverstigma =

Species of butterfly

Telipna transverstigma is a butterfly in the family Lycaenidae. It is found in Cameroon, the northern part of the Republic of the Congo and Gabon.
