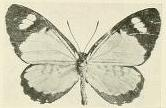

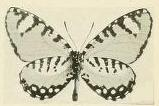

Scientific classification
- Kingdom: Animalia
- Phylum: Arthropoda
- Class: Insecta
- Order: Lepidoptera
- Family: Lycaenidae
- Genus: Telipna
- Species: T. hollandi

Binomial name
- Telipna hollandi Joicey & Talbot, 1921

Synonyms
- Telipna exsuperia Hulstaert, 1924; Telipna kelle Jackson, 1969

= Telipna hollandi =

Species of butterfly

Telipna hollandi is a butterfly in the family Lycaenidae. It is found in Cameroon, Equatorial Guinea, Gabon, the Republic of the Congo, the Central African Republic and the Democratic Republic of the Congo.

== Subspecies ==
- Telipna hollandi hollandi (north-eastern Democratic Republic of the Congo)
- Telipna hollandi exsuperia Hulstaert, 1924 (Cameroon, Equatorial Guinea, Gabon, Congo, Central African Republic, Democratic Republic of the Congo)
