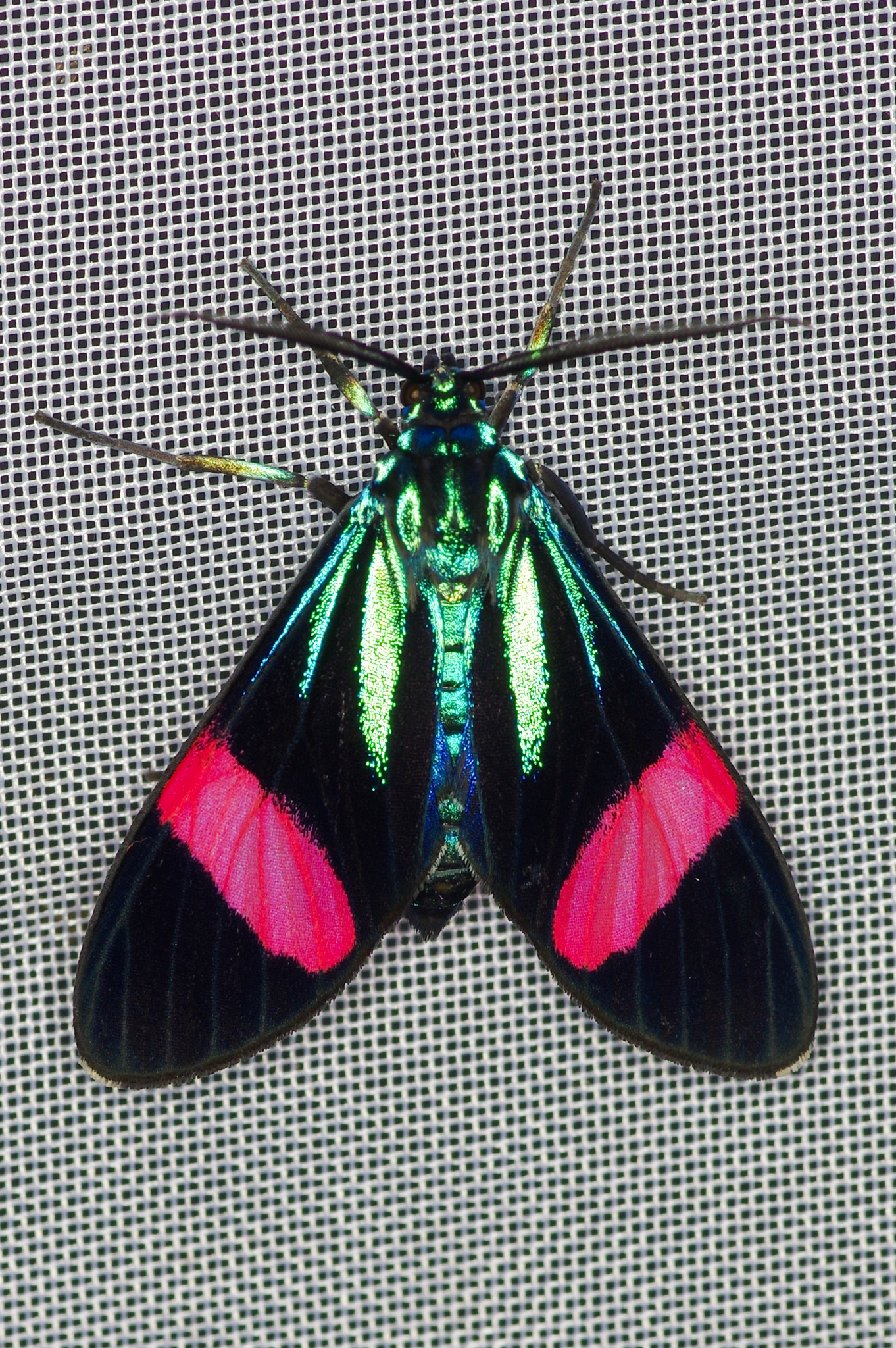

Scientific classification
- Kingdom: Animalia
- Phylum: Arthropoda
- Class: Insecta
- Order: Lepidoptera
- Superfamily: Noctuoidea
- Family: Erebidae
- Subfamily: Arctiinae
- Genus: Cyanopepla
- Species: C. julia

Binomial name
- Cyanopepla julia (H. Druce, 1883)

Synonyms
- Charidea julia H. Druce, 1883

= Cyanopepla julia =

Species of moth

Cyanopepla julia is a species of moth in the subfamily Arctiinae. It was first described by Herbert Druce in 1883. It has been found in Peru and Brazil (São Paulo).
