= Cyanopepla chelidon =

Scientific classification
- Domain: Eukaryota
- Kingdom: Animalia
- Phylum: Arthropoda
- Class: Insecta
- Order: Lepidoptera
- Superfamily: Noctuoidea
- Family: Erebidae
- Subfamily: Arctiinae
- Genus: Cyanopepla
- Species: C. chelidon

Binomial name
- Cyanopepla chelidon (H. Druce, 1893)

Synonyms
- Metastatia chelidon H. Druce, 1893

Species of moth

Cyanopepla chelidon is a moth of the subfamily Arctiinae. It was described by Herbert Druce in 1893. It is found in Colombia and the Upper Amazon region.
