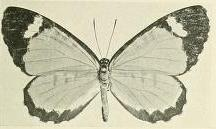

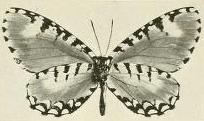

Scientific classification
- Kingdom: Animalia
- Phylum: Arthropoda
- Class: Insecta
- Order: Lepidoptera
- Family: Lycaenidae
- Genus: Telipna
- Species: T. plagiata

Binomial name
- Telipna plagiata Joicey & Talbot, 1921

Synonyms
- Telipna medjensis Holland, 1920

= Telipna plagiata =

Species of butterfly

Telipna plagiata is a butterfly in the family Lycaenidae. It is found in the Democratic Republic of the Congo.
