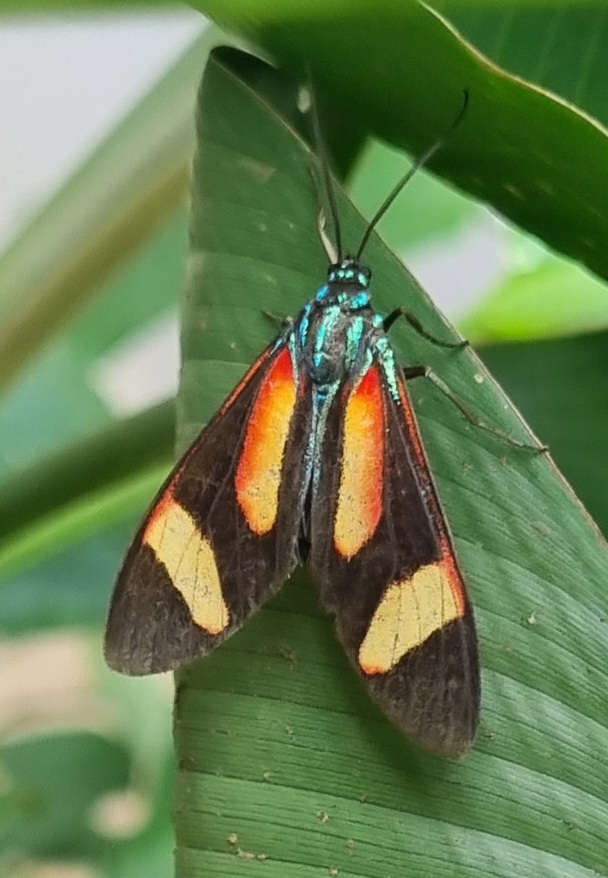

Scientific classification
- Kingdom: Animalia
- Phylum: Arthropoda
- Clade: Pancrustacea
- Class: Insecta
- Order: Lepidoptera
- Superfamily: Noctuoidea
- Family: Erebidae
- Subfamily: Arctiinae
- Genus: Cyanopepla
- Species: C. submacula

Binomial name
- Cyanopepla submacula (Walker, 1854)

Synonyms
- Euchromia submacula Walker, 1854; Charidea submacula

= Cyanopepla submacula =

Species of moth

Cyanopepla submacula is a moth of the subfamily Arctiinae. It was described by Francis Walker in 1854. It is found in Mexico, Guatemala, El Salvador, Costa Rica, Panama and Venezuela.
