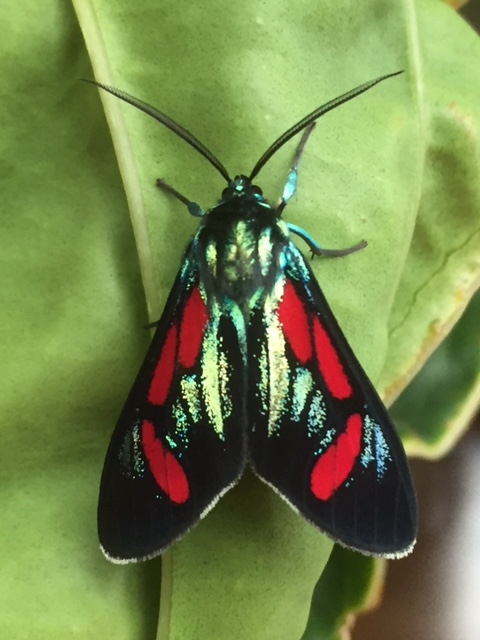
- In Peru

Scientific classification
- Domain: Eukaryota
- Kingdom: Animalia
- Phylum: Arthropoda
- Class: Insecta
- Order: Lepidoptera
- Superfamily: Noctuoidea
- Family: Erebidae
- Subfamily: Arctiinae
- Genus: Cyanopepla
- Species: C. hurama

Binomial name
- Cyanopepla hurama (Butler, 1876)

Synonyms
- Charidea hurama Butler, 1876; Charidea (Cyanopepla) subgloriosa Staudinger, 1894

= Cyanopepla hurama =

Species of moth

Cyanopepla hurama is a moth of the subfamily Arctiinae. It was described by Arthur Gardiner Butler in 1876. It is found in Ecuador, Bolivia and the Amazon region.
