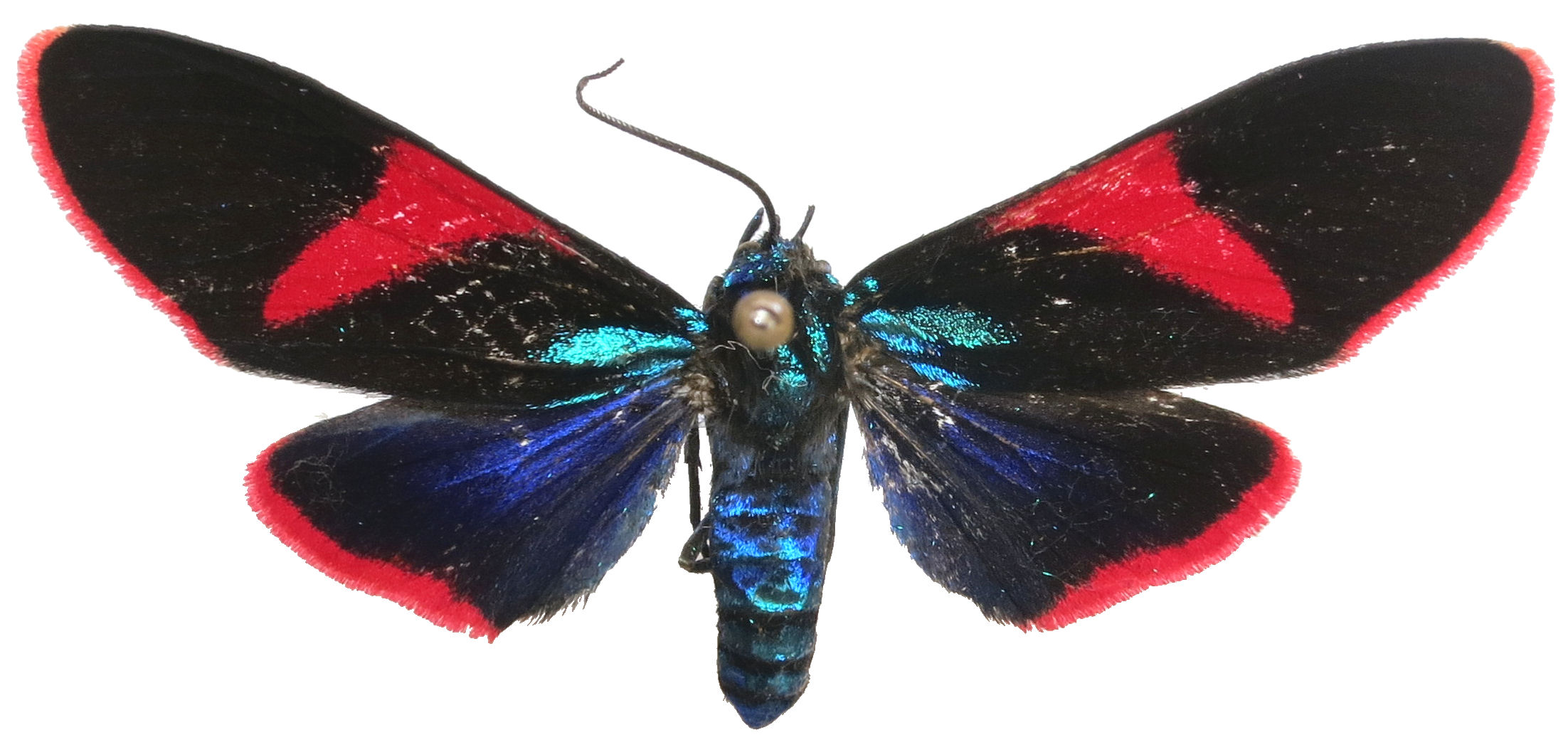
- From Costa Rica

Scientific classification
- Domain: Eukaryota
- Kingdom: Animalia
- Phylum: Arthropoda
- Class: Insecta
- Order: Lepidoptera
- Superfamily: Noctuoidea
- Family: Erebidae
- Subfamily: Arctiinae
- Genus: Cyanopepla
- Species: C. scintillans

Binomial name
- Cyanopepla scintillans (Butler, 1872)

Synonyms
- Euchromia scintillans Butler, 1872; Charidea scintillans

= Cyanopepla scintillans =

Species of moth

Cyanopepla scintillans is a moth of the subfamily Arctiinae. It was described by Arthur Gardiner Butler in 1872. It is found in Costa Rica and Panama.
