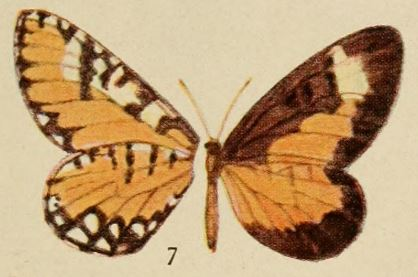

Scientific classification
- Kingdom: Animalia
- Phylum: Arthropoda
- Class: Insecta
- Order: Lepidoptera
- Family: Lycaenidae
- Genus: Telipna
- Species: T. aurivillii

Binomial name
- Telipna aurivillii Rebel, 1914

Synonyms
- Telipna rothioides Holland, 1920

= Telipna aurivillii =

Species of butterfly

Telipna aurivillii is a butterfly in the family Lycaenidae. It is found in the Democratic Republic of the Congo and Uganda.

== Subspecies ==
- Telipna aurivillii aurivillii (north-eastern Zaire)
- Telipna aurivillii jefferyi Jackson, 1969 (western Uganda)
