= Cyanopepla arrogans =

Scientific classification
- Kingdom: Animalia
- Phylum: Arthropoda
- Class: Insecta
- Order: Lepidoptera
- Superfamily: Noctuoidea
- Family: Erebidae
- Subfamily: Arctiinae
- Genus: Cyanopepla
- Species: C. arrogans

Binomial name
- Cyanopepla arrogans (Walker, 1854)

Synonyms
- Euchromia arrogans Walker, 1854; Charidea costaricensis Druce, 1884; Charidea arrogans

Species of moth

Cyanopepla arrogans is a moth belonging to the subfamily Arctiinae. It was described by Francis Walker in 1854. It is found in Mexico, Honduras, Guatemala, Costa Rica, Panama and Venezuela.
