= Cyanopepla lystra =

Scientific classification
- Domain: Eukaryota
- Kingdom: Animalia
- Phylum: Arthropoda
- Class: Insecta
- Order: Lepidoptera
- Superfamily: Noctuoidea
- Family: Erebidae
- Subfamily: Arctiinae
- Genus: Cyanopepla
- Species: C. lystra

Binomial name
- Cyanopepla lystra (H. Druce, 1896)

Synonyms
- Charidea lystra H. Druce, 1896

Species of moth

Cyanopepla lystra is a moth of the subfamily Arctiinae. It was described by Herbert Druce in 1896. It is found in Colombia.
