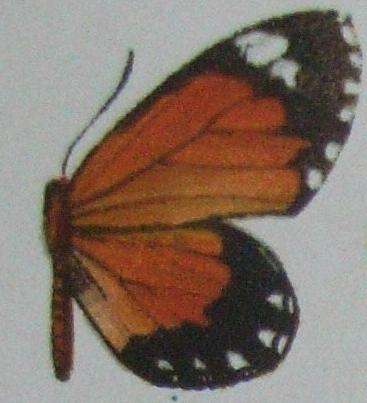

Scientific classification
- Kingdom: Animalia
- Phylum: Arthropoda
- Class: Insecta
- Order: Lepidoptera
- Family: Lycaenidae
- Genus: Telipna
- Species: T. erica

Binomial name
- Telipna erica Suffert, 1904

Synonyms
- Telipna acraea nigra Suffert, 1904

= Telipna erica =

Species of butterfly

Telipna erica is a butterfly in the family Lycaenidae. It is found in Cameroon, Gabon and the Democratic Republic of the Congo.
