= Cyanopepla amata =

Scientific classification
- Domain: Eukaryota
- Kingdom: Animalia
- Phylum: Arthropoda
- Class: Insecta
- Order: Lepidoptera
- Superfamily: Noctuoidea
- Family: Erebidae
- Subfamily: Arctiinae
- Genus: Cyanopepla
- Species: C. amata

Binomial name
- Cyanopepla amata (H. Druce, 1890)

Synonyms
- Charidea amata H. Druce, 1890

Species of moth

Cyanopepla amata is a moth of the subfamily Arctiinae. It was described by Herbert Druce in 1890. It is found in Colombia.
