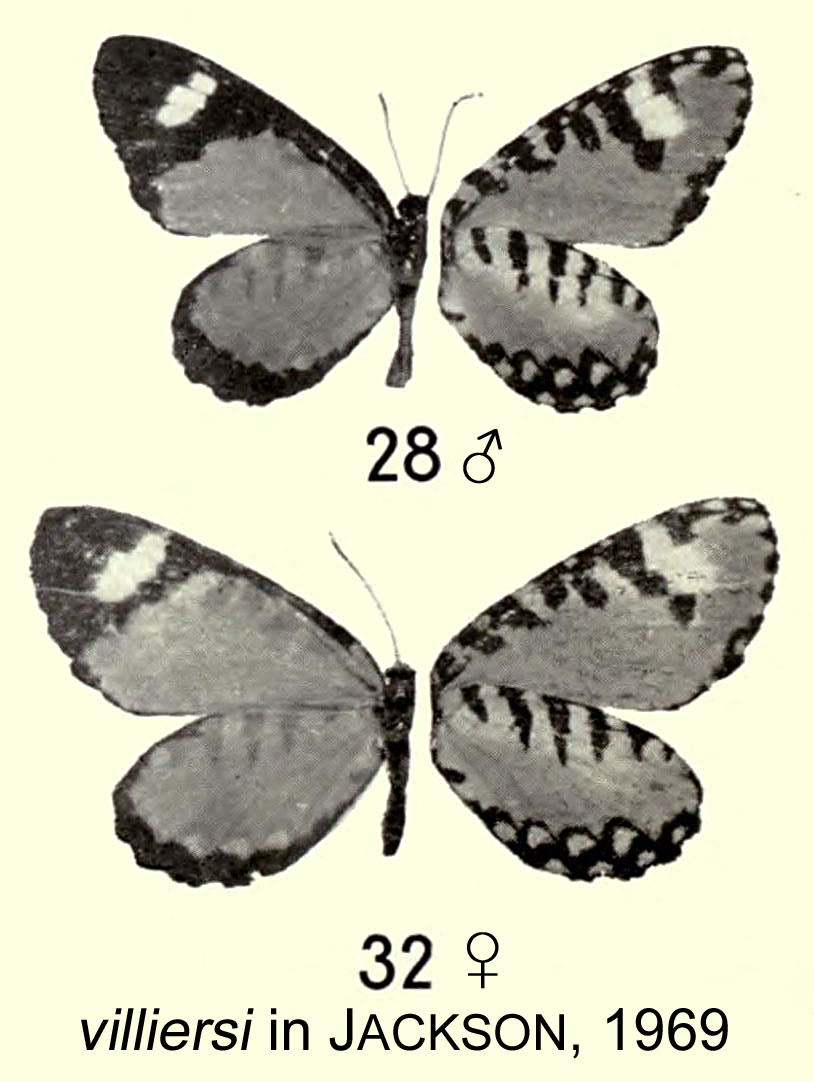

Scientific classification
- Kingdom: Animalia
- Phylum: Arthropoda
- Class: Insecta
- Order: Lepidoptera
- Family: Lycaenidae
- Genus: Telipna
- Species: T. villiersi

Binomial name
- Telipna villiersi Stempffer, 1965

= Telipna villiersi =

Species of butterfly

Telipna villiersi is a butterfly in the family Lycaenidae. It is found in the Republic of the Congo, Gabon and the western part of the Democratic Republic of the Congo.
