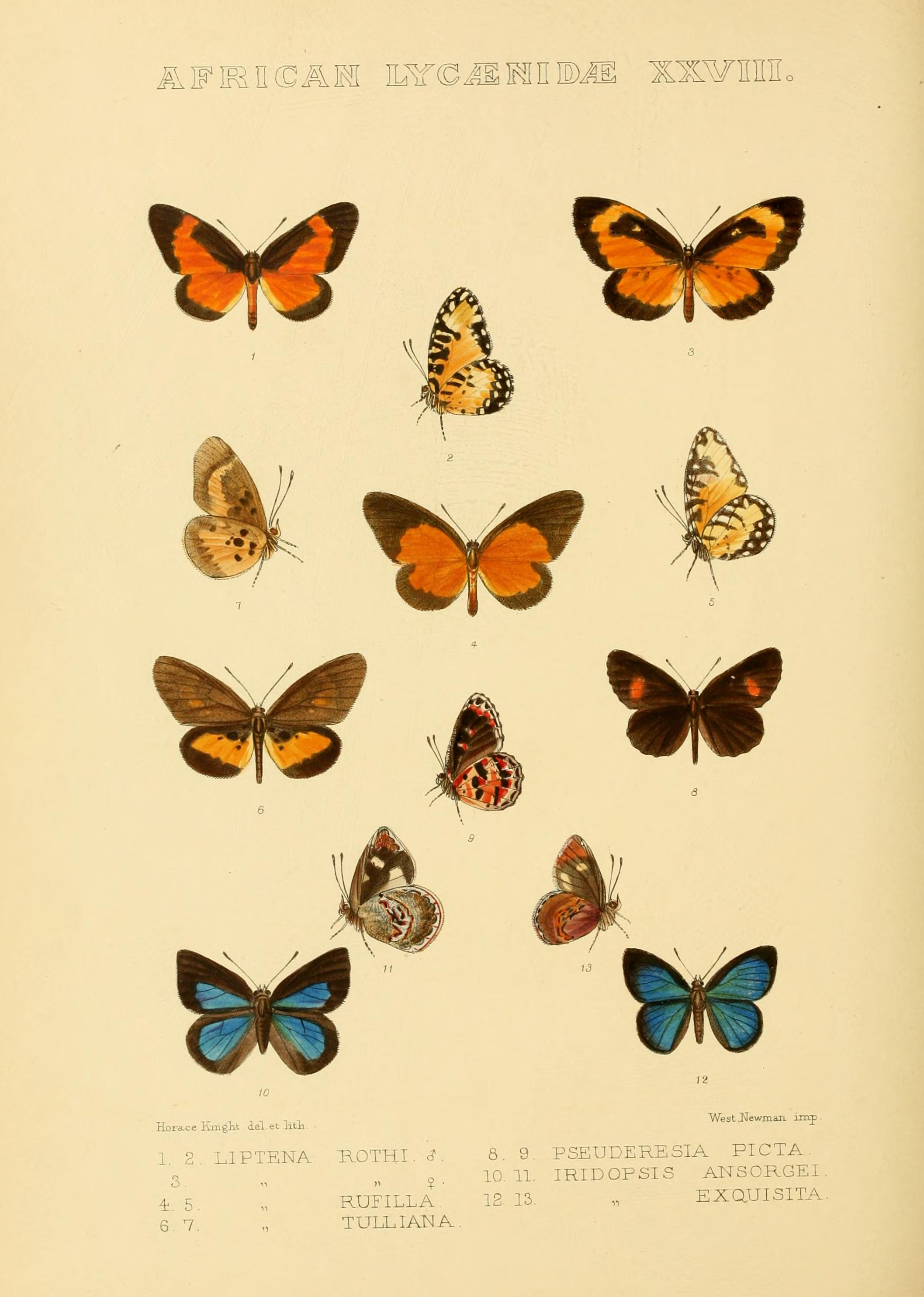
- Figures 1 and 2 male, figure 3 female

Scientific classification
- Kingdom: Animalia
- Phylum: Arthropoda
- Class: Insecta
- Order: Lepidoptera
- Family: Lycaenidae
- Genus: Telipna
- Species: T. rothi

Binomial name
- Telipna rothi (Grose-Smith, 1898)

Synonyms
- Liptena rothi Grose-Smith, 1898

= Telipna rothi =

Species of butterfly

Telipna rothi, Roth's telipna, is a butterfly in the family Lycaenidae. It is found in Nigeria.

The larvae feed on lichens.
