= Cyanopepla glaucopoides =

Scientific classification
- Kingdom: Animalia
- Phylum: Arthropoda
- Class: Insecta
- Order: Lepidoptera
- Superfamily: Noctuoidea
- Family: Erebidae
- Subfamily: Arctiinae
- Genus: Cyanopepla
- Species: C. glaucopoides

Binomial name
- Cyanopepla glaucopoides (Walker, 1854)

Synonyms
- Dioptis glaucopoides Walker, 1854

Species of moth

Cyanopepla glaucopoides is a moth of the subfamily Arctiinae. It was described by Francis Walker in 1854. It is found in Pará, Brazil.
