= Metamicroptera christophi =

Scientific classification
- Domain: Eukaryota
- Kingdom: Animalia
- Phylum: Arthropoda
- Class: Insecta
- Order: Lepidoptera
- Superfamily: Noctuoidea
- Family: Erebidae
- Subfamily: Arctiinae
- Genus: Metamicroptera
- Species: M. christophi

Binomial name
- Metamicroptera christophi Przybylowicz, 2005

Species of moth

Metamicroptera christophi is a moth of the family Erebidae. It was described by Lukasz Przybylowicz in 2005. It is found in Tanzania and Zambia.
