= Cyanopepla quadricolor =

Scientific classification
- Domain: Eukaryota
- Kingdom: Animalia
- Phylum: Arthropoda
- Class: Insecta
- Order: Lepidoptera
- Superfamily: Noctuoidea
- Family: Erebidae
- Subfamily: Arctiinae
- Genus: Cyanopepla
- Species: C. quadricolor

Binomial name
- Cyanopepla quadricolor C. Felder, 1874

Species of moth

Cyanopepla quadricolor is a moth of the subfamily Arctiinae. It was described by Cajetan Felder in 1874. It is found in Colombia.
