= Telipna kigoma =

Scientific classification
- Kingdom: Animalia
- Phylum: Arthropoda
- Class: Insecta
- Order: Lepidoptera
- Family: Lycaenidae
- Genus: Telipna
- Species: T. kigoma

Binomial name
- Telipna kigoma Kielland, 1978

Synonyms
- Telipna sanguinea kigoma Kielland, 1978

Species of butterfly

Telipna kigoma is a butterfly in the family Lycaenidae. It is found in the Mpanda and Kigoma regions of Tanzania. The habitat consists of riverine forests.
