= Metamicroptera =

Scientific classification
- Domain: Eukaryota
- Kingdom: Animalia
- Phylum: Arthropoda
- Class: Insecta
- Order: Lepidoptera
- Superfamily: Noctuoidea
- Family: Erebidae
- Subfamily: Arctiinae
- Tribe: Syntomini
- Genus: Metamicroptera; Hulstaert, 1923

Synonyms
- Micrometaptera Kiriakoff, 1960; Neobalacra Kiriakoff, 1952

Genus of moths

Metamicroptera is a genus of moths in the family Erebidae.

== Species ==
- Metamicroptera christophi Przybylowicz, 2005
- Metamicroptera rotundata Hulstaert, 1923
