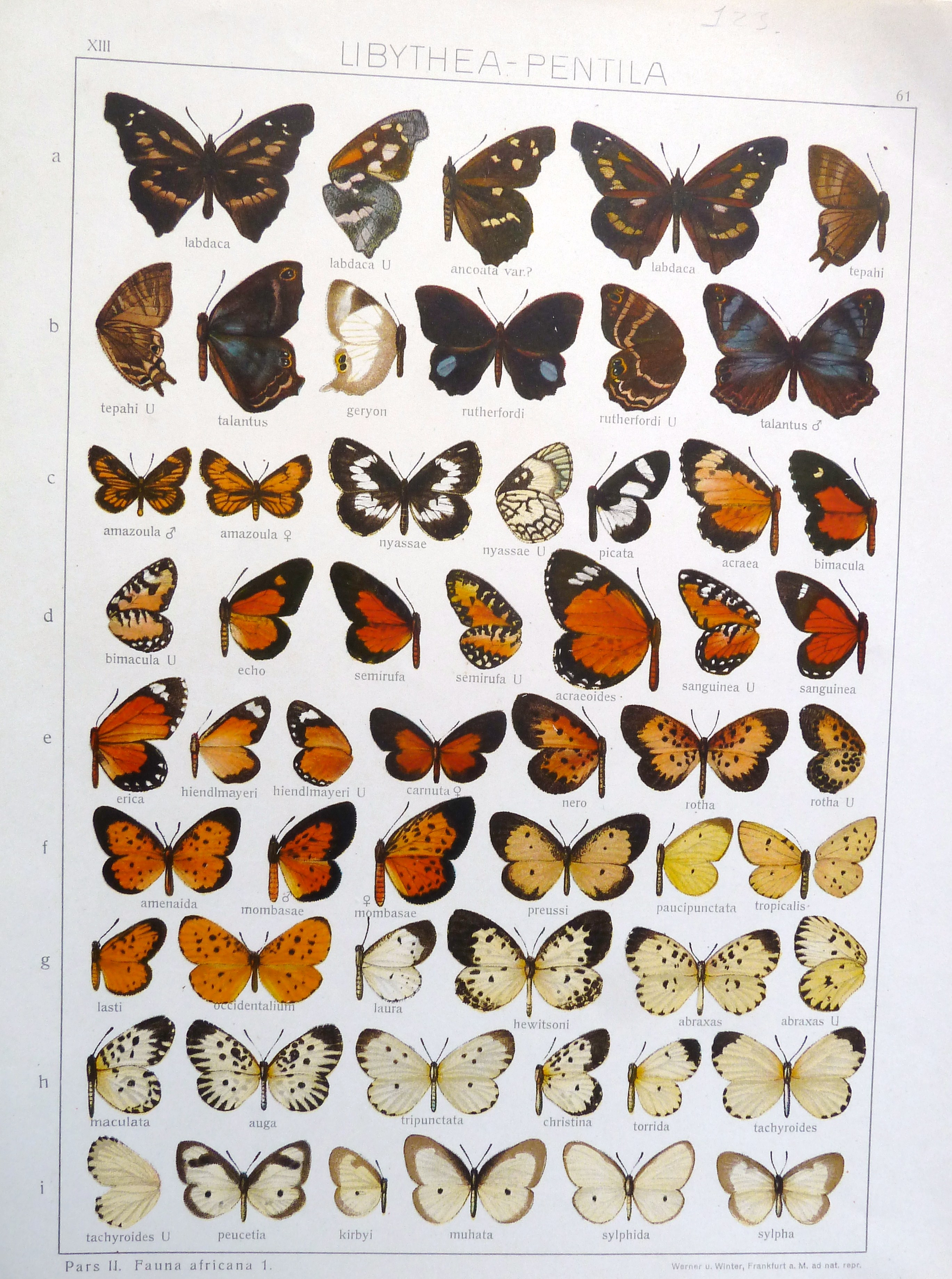
- In Adalbert Seitz's Fauna Africana

Scientific classification
- Kingdom: Animalia
- Phylum: Arthropoda
- Class: Insecta
- Order: Lepidoptera
- Family: Lycaenidae
- Genus: Telipna
- Species: T. acraeoides

Binomial name
- Telipna acraeoides (Grose-Smith & Kirby, 1890)

Synonyms
- Liptena acraeoides Grose-Smith & Kirby, 1890

= Telipna acraeoides =

Species of butterfly

Telipna acraeoides is a butterfly in the family Lycaenidae. It is found in the Republic of the Congo, the Democratic Republic of the Congo and north-western Angola.
