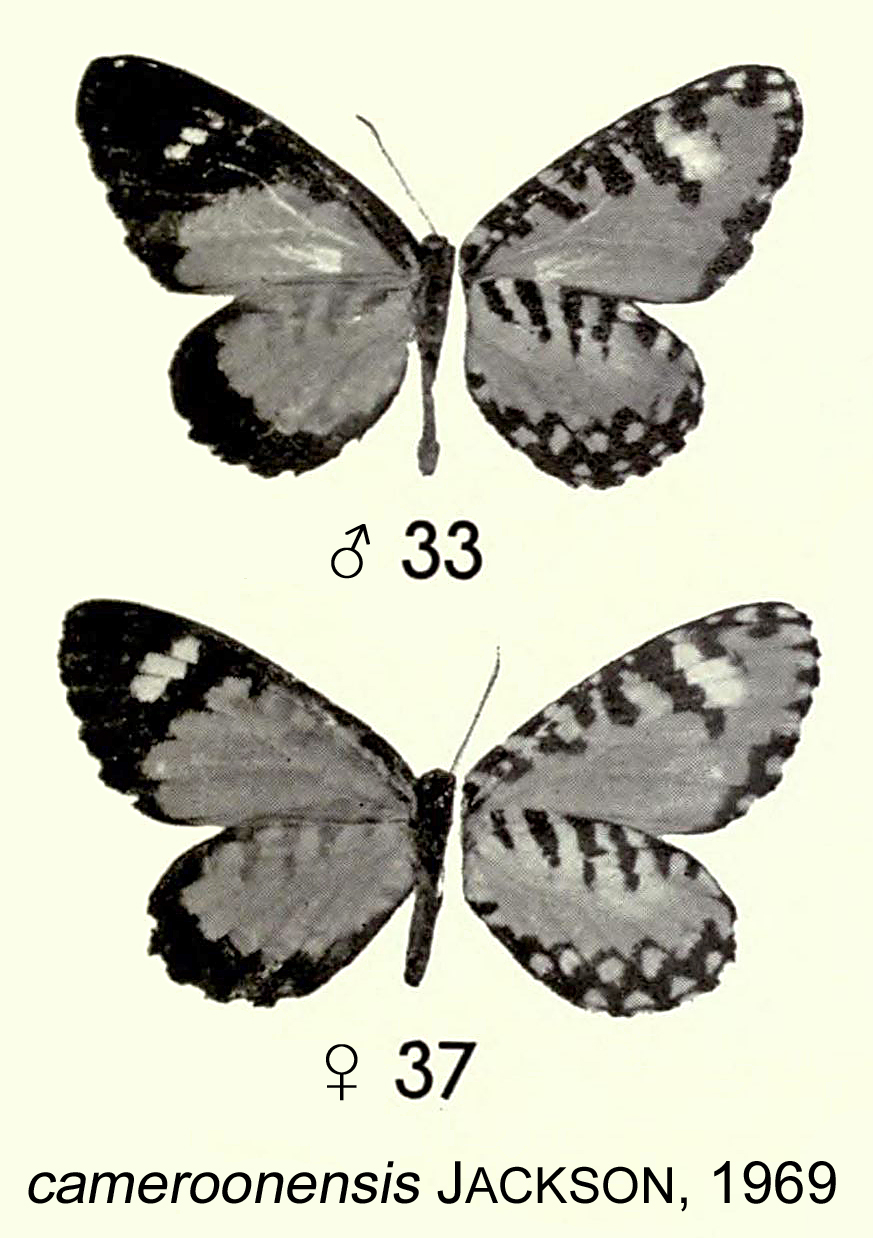

Scientific classification
- Kingdom: Animalia
- Phylum: Arthropoda
- Class: Insecta
- Order: Lepidoptera
- Family: Lycaenidae
- Genus: Telipna
- Species: T. cameroonensis

Binomial name
- Telipna cameroonensis Jackson, 1969

= Telipna cameroonensis =

Species of butterfly

Telipna cameroonensis, the Cameroon telipna, is a butterfly in the family Lycaenidae. It is found in south-eastern Nigeria, western Cameroon, the Republic of the Congo and Gabon. The habitat consists of forests.
