= Cyanopepla masia =

Scientific classification
- Kingdom: Animalia
- Phylum: Arthropoda
- Class: Insecta
- Order: Lepidoptera
- Superfamily: Noctuoidea
- Family: Erebidae
- Subfamily: Arctiinae
- Genus: Cyanopepla
- Species: C. masia

Binomial name
- Cyanopepla masia (Dognin, 1889)

Synonyms
- Euagra masia Dognin, 1889

Species of moth

Cyanopepla masia is a moth of the subfamily Arctiinae. It was described by Paul Dognin in 1889. It is found in Ecuador.
