= Cyanopepla bertha =

Scientific classification
- Domain: Eukaryota
- Kingdom: Animalia
- Phylum: Arthropoda
- Class: Insecta
- Order: Lepidoptera
- Superfamily: Noctuoidea
- Family: Erebidae
- Subfamily: Arctiinae
- Genus: Cyanopepla
- Species: C. bertha

Binomial name
- Cyanopepla bertha (H. Druce, 1883)

Synonyms
- Charidea bertha H. Druce, 1883

Species of moth

Cyanopepla bertha is a moth of the subfamily Arctiinae. It was described by Herbert Druce in 1883. It is found in Ecuador.
