= Cyanopepla pretiosa =

Scientific classification
- Kingdom: Animalia
- Phylum: Arthropoda
- Class: Insecta
- Order: Lepidoptera
- Superfamily: Noctuoidea
- Family: Erebidae
- Subfamily: Arctiinae
- Genus: Cyanopepla
- Species: C. pretiosa

Binomial name
- Cyanopepla pretiosa (Burmeister, 1880)

Synonyms
- Charidea pretiosa Burmeister, 1880

Species of moth

Cyanopepla pretiosa is a moth of the subfamily Arctiinae. It was described by Hermann Burmeister in 1880. It is found in Argentina and Colombia.
