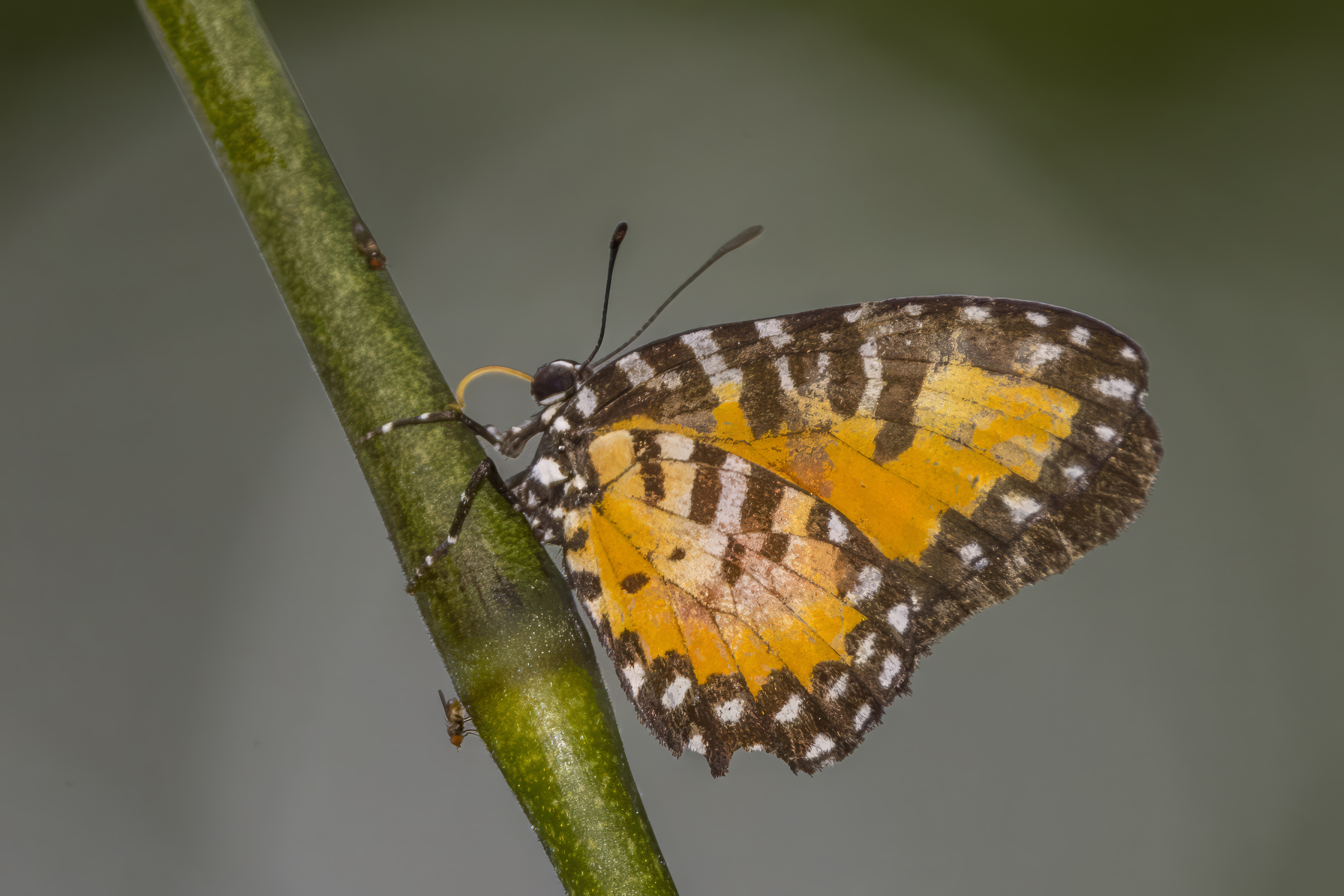
- Male T. semirufa

Scientific classification
- Kingdom: Animalia
- Phylum: Arthropoda
- Class: Insecta
- Order: Lepidoptera
- Family: Lycaenidae
- Tribe: Liptenini
- Genus: Telipna; Aurivillius, 1895

= Telipna =

Butterfly genus in family Lycaenidae

Telipna is a genus of butterflies in the family Lycaenidae. The species of this genus are endemic to the Afrotropical realm.

== Species ==
- Telipna acraea (Westwood, [1851])
- Telipna acraeoides (Grose-Smith & Kirby, 1890)
- Telipna albofasciata Aurivillius, 1910
- Telipna atrinervis Hulstaert, 1924
- Telipna aurivillii Rebel, 1914
- Telipna cameroonensis Jackson, 1969
- Telipna centralis Libert, 2005
- Telipna citrimaculata Schultze, 1916
- Telipna consanguinea Rebel, 1914
- Telipna cuypersi Libert, 2005
- Telipna ducarmei Libert, 2005
- Telipna erica Suffert, 1904
- Telipna hollandi Joicey & Talbot, 1921
- Telipna ja Bethune-Baker, 1926
- Telipna kaputui Libert, 2005
- Telipna kayonza Jackson, 1969
- Telipna kigoma Kielland, 1978
- Telipna nyanza Neave, 1904
- Telipna plagiata Joicey & Talbot, 1921
- Telipna rothi (Grose-Smith, 1898)
- Telipna rufilla (Grose-Smith, 1901)
- Telipna ruspinoides Schultze, 1923
- Telipna sanguinea (Plötz, 1880)
- Telipna semirufa (Grose-Smith & Kirby, 1889)
- Telipna sheffieldi Bethune-Baker, 1926
- Telipna sulpitia Hulstaert, 1924
- Telipna transverstigma Druce, 1910
- Telipna villiersi Stempffer, 1965
