= Cyanopepla xenodice =

Scientific classification
- Domain: Eukaryota
- Kingdom: Animalia
- Phylum: Arthropoda
- Class: Insecta
- Order: Lepidoptera
- Superfamily: Noctuoidea
- Family: Erebidae
- Subfamily: Arctiinae
- Genus: Cyanopepla
- Species: C. xenodice

Binomial name
- Cyanopepla xenodice (H. Druce, 1884)

Synonyms
- Charidea xenodice H. Druce, 1884

Species of moth

Cyanopepla xenodice is a moth of the subfamily Arctiinae. It was described by Herbert Druce in 1884. It is found in Costa Rica.
