= Gustaaf Hulstaert =

Belgian entomologist (1900–1990)

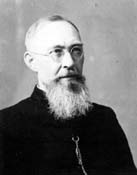
Gustaaf Hulstaert

Gustaaf Hulstaert (1900–1990) was a Belgian missionary who served with the Missionaries of Scheut in the Belgian Congo from 1925.

A keen entomologist, Hulstaert was interested in the Lepidoptera and before his posting to the Congo studied insects from the Dutch East Indies (including Dutch New Guinea) sent to him by other missionaries. His collection is held by Naturalis Biodiversity Center in Leiden.

His contributions also extend to anthropologic fields, such as ethnography and linguistics of peoples living in the Democratic Republic of the Congo, especially those pertaining to Mongo people.

== Works ==
Biology:

- Hulstaert, G. 1923. On Lepidoptera from New Guinea, Kei, Tenimber, the Philippines, and Australia. Annals and Magazine of Natural History (9)11: 178–190.
- Hulstaert, G., 1924 New Indo-Australian Noctuidae. Annals and Magazine of Natural History (9)13: 97–127.
- Hulstaert, G., 1924 New moths from New Guinea, Kei, and Tenimber. Annals and Magazine of Natural History (9)13: 127–139.
- Hulstaert, G., 1924 Heteroceres indoaustraliens nouveaux. Annales de la Société Entomologique de Belgique 64: 85–101.
- Hulstaert, R.P.G. 1924 Pieridae nouveaux de l'Afrique Central. Revue de Zoologie et de Botanique Africaine 12:90–99.
- Hulstaert, R.P.G. 1924 Lycaenidae nouveaux des collections du Musee du Congo Belge. Revue de Zoologie et de Botanique Africaine 12:112–122; 173–194.
- Hulstaert, R.P.G. 1924 Rhopaloceres nouveaux du Congo Belge. Revue de Zoologie et de Botanique Africaine 12:476–481.
- Hulstaert, R.P.G. 1926 Rhopaloceres nouveaux du Musee du Congo Belge. Revue de Zoologie et de Botanique Africaine 14:60–63.
- Hulstaert, R.P.G. Lepidoptera Rhopalocera, Fam. Danaidae, Subfam. Danaidinae and Tellervinae. Genera Insectorum (1931)[ii] +

Linguistics:

- Hulstaert, G. 1965. Grammaire du lɔmɔ́ngɔ, II: la morphologie. (Annales du MRAC (Musée Royal de l'Afrique Centrale), sciences humaines, 57.) Tervuren: Musée Royal de l'Afrique Centrale (MRAC). viii+680pp. (Google Books)

== Taxon named in his honor ==
- The butterfly barb, Enteromius hulstaerti (Poll, 1945) is a species of cyprinid fish in the genus Enteromius.

== See also ==
- Mbandaka
