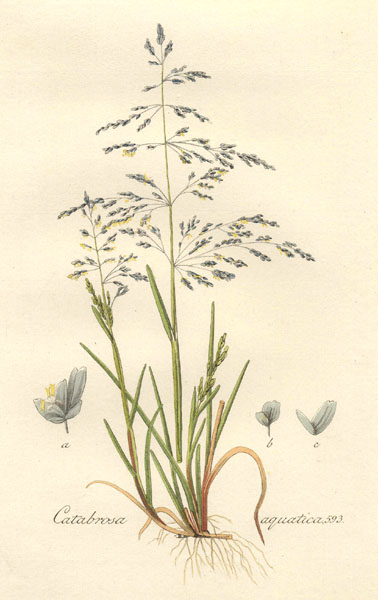
- Catabrosa aquatica

Scientific classification
- Kingdom: Plantae
- Clade: Tracheophytes
- Clade: Angiosperms
- Clade: Monocots
- Clade: Commelinids
- Order: Poales
- Family: Poaceae
- Subfamily: Pooideae
- Supertribe: Poodae
- Tribe: Poeae
- Subtribe: Coleanthinae
- Genus: Catabrosa; P.Beauv., 1812

Type species
- Catabrosa aquatica (L.) P.Beauv.

Synonyms
- Catabrosia Roem. & Schult

= Catabrosa =

Genus of grasses

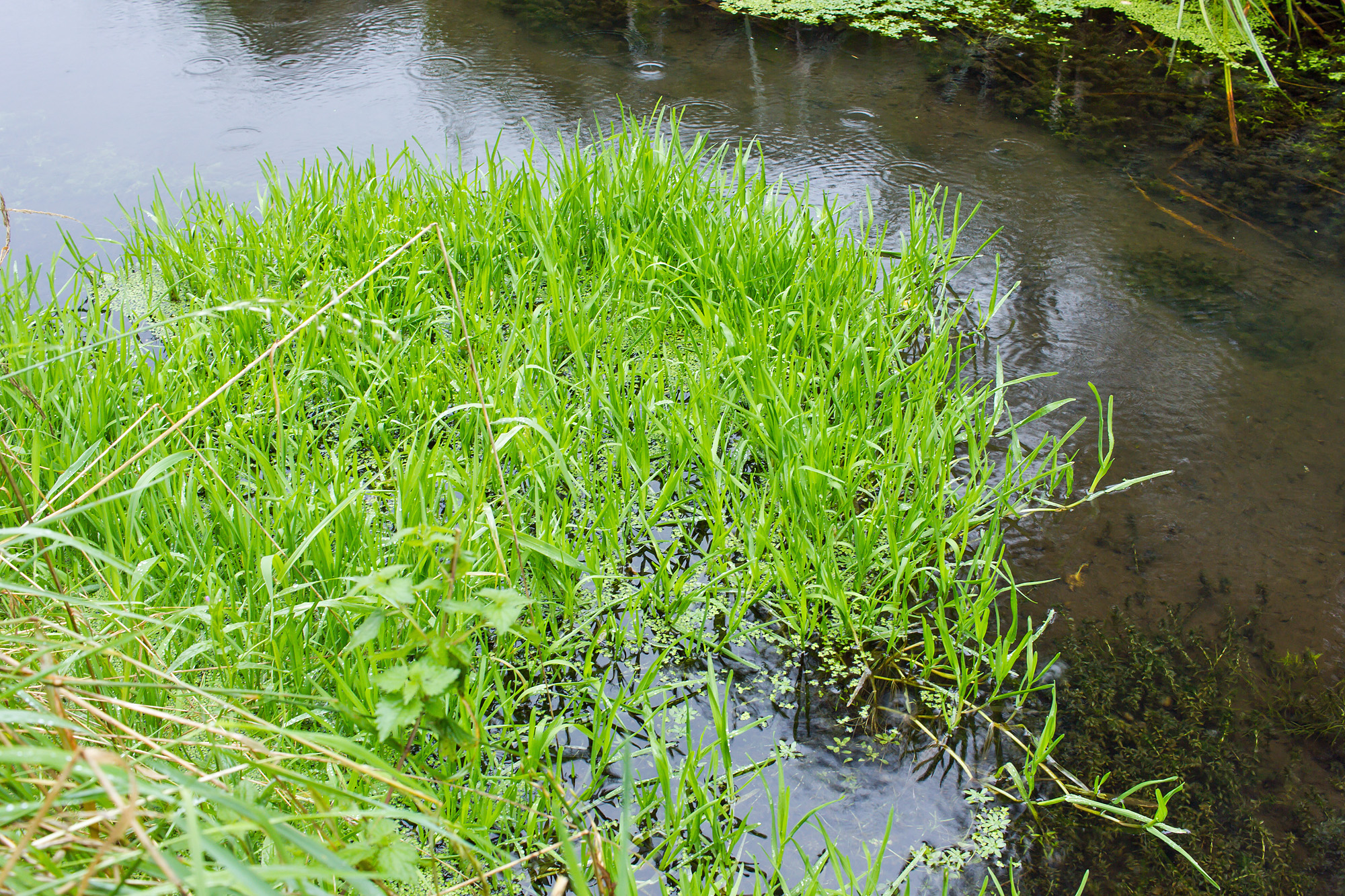
Catabrosa aquatica, flooding in a ditch in Germany

Catabrosa is a small but widespread genus of plants in the grass family native to temperate areas of Eurasia, the Americas, and a few places in Africa.

Catabrosa aquatica is in flower in Europe from June to August, and the seeds ripen from July to September. The flowers are hermaphrodite (have both male and female organs) and are pollinated by wind. They are a short, blunt‑leaved plants similar to Poa trivialis, which grows in wetland.

== Species ==
Accepted species

- Catabrosa aquatica (L.) Beauv. - Europe, Russia, China, Mongolia, Central Asia, Greenland, Canada, United States, southern Argentina, southern Chile
- Catabrosa drakensbergensis (Hedberg & I.Hedberg) Soreng & Fish - Lesotho, KwaZulu-Natal
- Catabrosa werdermannii (Pilg.) Nicora & Rúgolo - Chile, Bolivia, Argentina

formerly included

Numerous names have been created in the genus that are no longer widely accepted. Some of these names are now regarded as synonymous with the accepted names listed above. Other names refer to species now considered to be better suited to other genera. The following list gives the Catabrosa name followed by the currently accepted name, in order to help you find appropriate information. Links to genera: Arctagrostis Antinoria Colpodium Deschampsia Eragrostis Glyceria Hyalopoa Periballia Phippsia Poa Puccinellia

- Catabrosa agrostidea - Antinoria insularis
- Catabrosa algida - Phippsia algida
- Catabrosa algida f. vestita - × Pucciphippsia vacillans
- Catabrosa altaica - Colpodium altaicum
- Catabrosa antarctica - Deschampsia chapmanii
- Catabrosa arundinacea - Arctagrostis arundinacea
- Catabrosa balansae - Colpodium variegatum
- Catabrosa burkartii - Poa perligulata
- Catabrosa caucasica - Colpodium colchicum
- Catabrosa colchica - Colpodium colchicum
- Catabrosa concinna - Phippsia concinna
- Catabrosa distans - Puccinellia distans
- Catabrosa elodes - Poa nemoralis
- Catabrosa festuciformis - Puccinellia festuciformis
- Catabrosa fibrosa - Colpodium fibrosum
- Catabrosa frigida - Puccinellia frigida
- Catabrosa glaucescens - Puccinellia glaucescens
- Catabrosa helodes - Poa nemoralis
- Catabrosa hierochloides - Colpodium humile
- Catabrosa himalaica - Colpodium himalaicum
- Catabrosa humilis - Colpodium humile
- Catabrosa hydrophila - Glyceria maxima
- Catabrosa magellanica - Puccinellia magellanica
- Catabrosa maritima - Puccinellia maritima
- Catabrosa micrantha - Eragrostis japonica
- Catabrosa minuta - Periballia minuta
- Catabrosa monandra - Phippsia algida
- Catabrosa nervata - Glyceria striata
- Catabrosa nutans - Hyalopoa nutans
- Catabrosa parviflora - Colpodium parviflorum
- Catabrosa pauciflora - Poa glauca
- Catabrosa pilosa - Eragrostis japonica
- Catabrosa pontica - Hyalopoa pontica
- Catabrosa pumila - Poa annua
- Catabrosa tenuifolia - Puccinellia preslii
- Catabrosa thomsonii - Poa infirma
- Catabrosa trollii - Colpodium himalaicum
- Catabrosa variegata - Colpodium variegatum
- Catabrosa versicolor - Colpodium versicolor
- Catabrosa verticillata - Eragrostis pilosa
- Catabrosa vilfoidea - Puccinellia phryganodes
- Catabrosa violacea - Colpodium violaceum
- Catabrosa wallichii - Colpodium wallichii

== See also ==
- List of Poaceae genera
