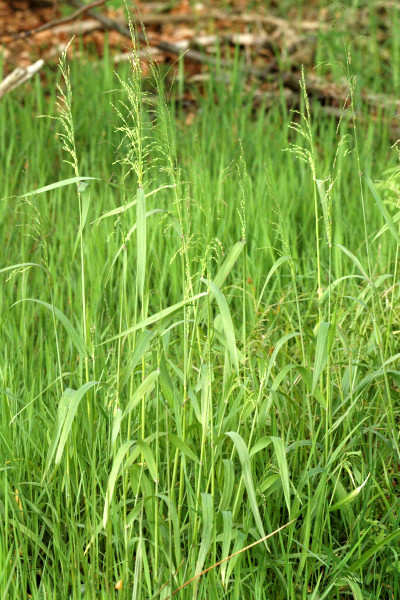
- Milium effusum

Scientific classification
- Kingdom: Plantae
- Clade: Tracheophytes
- Clade: Angiosperms
- Clade: Monocots
- Clade: Commelinids
- Order: Poales
- Family: Poaceae
- Subfamily: Pooideae
- Supertribe: Poodae
- Tribe: Poeae
- Subtribe: Miliinae; Dumort.
- Genus: Milium; L. 1753 not Adans. 1763

Type species
- Milium effusum L.

Synonyms
- Miliarium Moench

= Milium (plant) =

Genus of grasses

Milium (vernacular name milletgrass) is a genus of Eurasian, North American, and North African plants in the grass family.

== Species ==
- Milium atropatanum Maroofi - Iran
- Milium effusum L. - eastern + central Canada; northeastern + north-central United States; Eurasia + North Africa from Iceland + Spain to Taiwan + Kamchatka
- Milium pedicellare (Bornm.) Roshev. ex Melderis - Middle East
- Milium schmidtianum K.Koch - Turkey, Iran, Caucasus
- Milium transcaucasicum Tzvelev - Transcaucasus
- Milium vernale M.Bieb. - Eurasia + North Africa from France + Morocco to Kazakhstan; naturalized in Idaho

=== Formerly included ===
Many species once included in Milium but now considered better suited to other genera: Achnatherum, Aeluropus, Agrostis, Airopsis, Alloteropsis, Amphicarpum, Aniselytron, Anthaenantia, Antinoria, Apera, Arundinella, Axonopus, Brachiaria, Cynodon, Digitaria, Echinochloa, Eriochloa, Eriocoma, Gastridium, Homolepis, Ichnanthus, Isachne, Luziola, Muhlenbergia, Nassella, Oplismenus, Oryzopsis, Panicum, Paspalum, Pentameris, Piptatherum, Piptochaetium, Poa, Polypogon, Sorghum, Sporobolus, Trachypogon, Tricholaena, Triplachne, Zingeria and Zoysia.
