= Limnas =

Scientific classification
- Kingdom: Plantae
- Clade: Tracheophytes
- Clade: Angiosperms
- Clade: Monocots
- Clade: Commelinids
- Order: Poales
- Family: Poaceae
- Subfamily: Pooideae
- Supertribe: Poodae
- Tribe: Poeae
- Subtribe: Alopecurinae
- Genus: Limnas; Trin. 1820 not Ehrh. ex House 1920 (syn of Hammarbya in Orchidaceae)

Type species
- Limnas stelleri Trin.

Genus of grasses

Limnas is a genus of Asian plants in the grass family. It is found in northern and central Asia (Russia and Kazakhstan).

Species

- Limnas malyschevii O.D.Nikif. - Krasnoyarsk, Yakutiya
- Limnas stelleri Trin. - Krasnoyarsk, Yakutiya, Irkutsk, Buryatiya, Khabarovsk Krai
- Limnas veresczaginii Krylov & Schischk. - Kazakhstan

formerly included

- Limnas arkansana - Limnodea arkansana
- Limnas pilosa - Limnodea arkansana
