= Glyceria aquatica =

Glyceria aquatica can refer to:

- Glyceria aquatica (L.) J.Presl & C.Presl, a synonym of Catabrosa aquatica (L.) P.Beauv.
- Glyceria aquatica (L.) Wahlb., a synonym of Glyceria maxima (Hartm.) Holmb.
