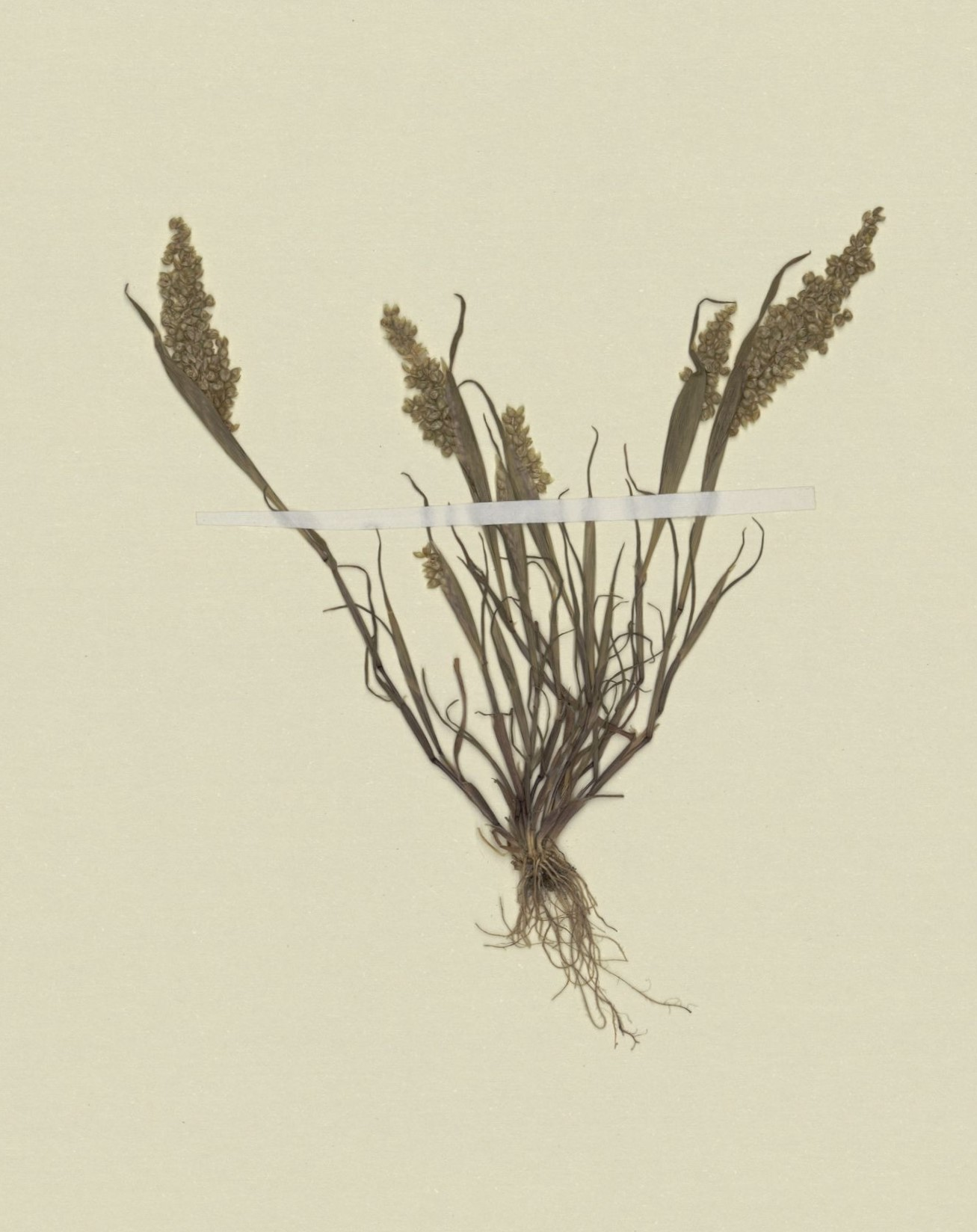

Conservation status
- Least Concern (IUCN 3.1)

Scientific classification
- Kingdom: Plantae
- Clade: Tracheophytes
- Clade: Angiosperms
- Clade: Monocots
- Clade: Commelinids
- Order: Poales
- Family: Poaceae
- Subfamily: Pooideae
- Supertribe: Poodae
- Tribe: Poeae
- Subtribe: Brizinae
- Genus: Airopsis; Desv.
- Species: A. tenella

Binomial name
- Airopsis tenella (Cav.) Coss. & Durieu

Synonyms
- Aeropsis Asch. & Graebn.; Sphaerella Bubani; Milium tenellum Cav.; Agrostis tenella (Cav.) Poir.; Aeropsis tenella (Cav.) Asch. & Graebn.; Aira globosa Thore; Airopsis globosa (Thore) Desv.; Paspalum globosum (Thore) Raspail; Briza globosa (Thore) Mutel; Sphaerella pumila Bubani

= Airopsis =

Genus of grasses

Airopsis is a genus of southern European and northern African plants in the grass family.

Species

The only accepted species is Airopsis tenella, native to the western Mediterranean: Portugal, Spain, France incl Corsica, Italy incl Sicily, Algeria, Tunisia, Morocco.

formerly included

Numerous other species were once included in Airopsis but are now regarded as better suited to other genera, including Aira Antinoria Dissanthelium Eragrostis Pentameris Periballia Poa Sphenopholis

- Airopsis agrostidea – Antinoria agrostidea
- Airopsis ampla – Pentameris ampla
- Airopsis aurea – Pentameris aurea
- Airopsis brevifolia – Poa secunda
- Airopsis candolei – Antinoria agrostidea
- Airopsis capillaris – Aira elegantissima
- Airopsis caryophyllea – Aira caryophyllea
- Airopsis cupaniana – Aira cupaniana
- Airopsis insularis – Antinoria insularis
- Airopsis involucrata – Periballia involucrata
- Airopsis jubata – Eragrostis japonica
- Airopsis laevis – Periballia laevis
- Airopsis lendigera – Periballia laevis
- Airopsis millegrana – Eragrostis airoides
- Airopsis minuta – Periballia minuta
- Airopsis multiculmis – Antinoria insularis
- Airopsis obtusata – Sphenopholis obtusata
- Airopsis pallida – Pentameris ampla
- Airopsis peruviana – Dissanthelium peruvianum
- Airopsis praecox – Aira praecox
- Airopsis pulchella – Aira tenorei
- Airopsis setacea – Aira elegantissima
- Airopsis steudelii – Pentameris malouinensis
- Airopsis triseta – Eriachne triseta
- Airopsis tuberculata – Pentameris setifolia

== See also ==
- List of Poaceae genera
