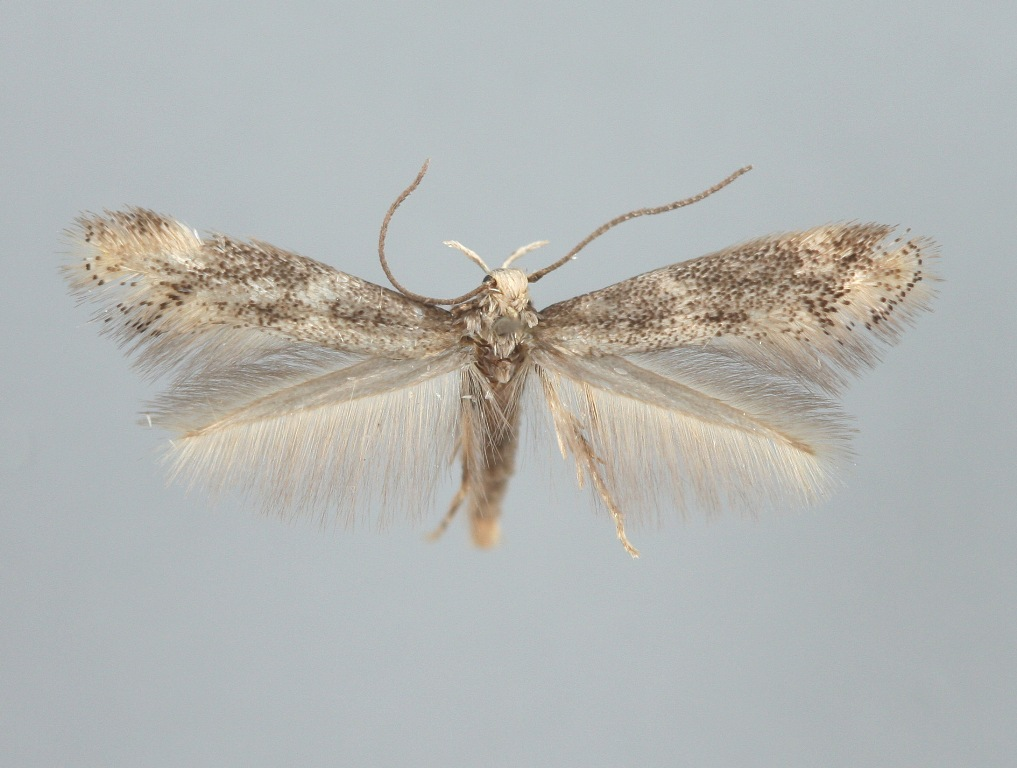

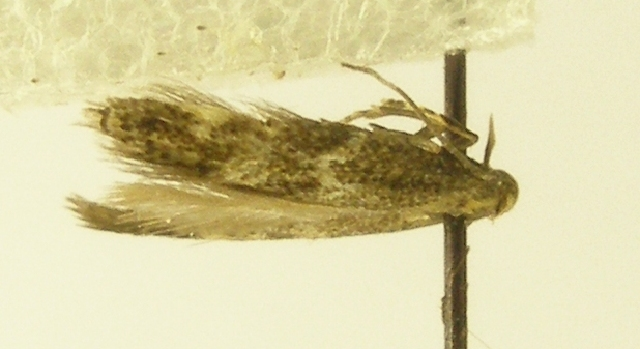

Scientific classification
- Domain: Eukaryota
- Kingdom: Animalia
- Phylum: Arthropoda
- Class: Insecta
- Order: Lepidoptera
- Family: Elachistidae
- Genus: Elachista
- Species: E. canapennella

Binomial name
- Elachista canapennella (Hübner, 1813)

Synonyms
- List: Tinea canapennella Hübner, 1813; Tinea pulchella Haworth, 1828; Elachista pulchella (Haworth, 1828); Poeciloptilia obscurella Stainton, 1849; Poeciloptilia incanella Herrich-Schäffer, 1855; Elachista incanella (Herrich-Schäffer, 1855); Elachista subobscurella Doubleday, 1859; Poeciloptilia montanella Wocke, 1862; Elachista ranenensis Strand, 1919; Elachista albimarginella Hering, 1924; Elachista postremella Dufrane, 1957

= Elachista canapennella =

Species of moth

Elachista canapennella is a moth of the family Elachistidae found in Europe.

== Description ==
The wingspan is 8–10 millimetres (0.31–0.39 in). The head is grey, face whitish. Forewings in male pale grey irrorated with black, in female blackish except on basal area; a somewhat oblique fascia before middle, a tornal spot, and triangular costal spot somewhat beyond it in male very indistinct, whitish, almost obsolete, in female broader, white, conspicuous. Hindwings are grey. The larva is pale yellowish-grey; head pale brown.

Adults are on wing from April to June and from July to September. There are two generations per year.

The larvae feed on creeping bent (Agrostis stolonifera), false oat-grass (Arrhenatherum elatius), Avenula pubescens, tufted hairgrass (Deschampsia cespitosa), fescue (Festuca species), creeping soft grass (Holcus mollis) and meadow-grass (Poa). They mine the leaves of their host. The pupation takes place outside the mine.

== Distribution ==
It is found from Fennoscandia and northern Russia to the Pyrenees, Italy and Romania and from Ireland to central Russia.
