= Simplicia =

Simplicia may refer to:

- Simplicia (automobile), a defunct French automobile manufacturer
- Simplicia (moth), a genus of moth
- Simplicia (plant), a genus of plants in the grass family
