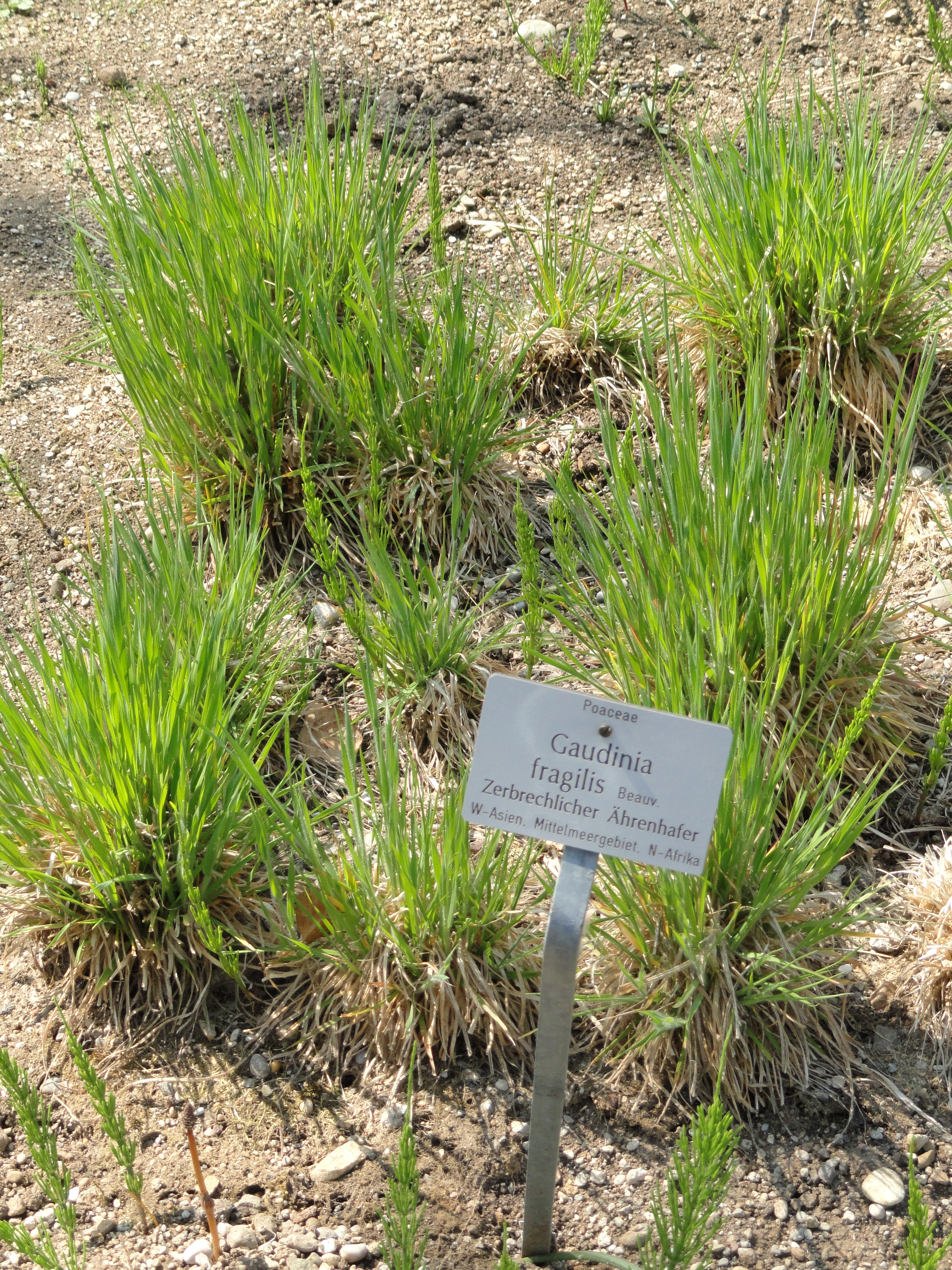
- Gaudinia fragilis

Scientific classification
- Kingdom: Plantae
- Clade: Tracheophytes
- Clade: Angiosperms
- Clade: Monocots
- Clade: Commelinids
- Order: Poales
- Family: Poaceae
- Subfamily: Pooideae
- Supertribe: Poodae
- Tribe: Poeae
- Subtribe: Aveninae
- Genus: Gaudinia; P.Beauv.

Type species
- Gaudinia fragilis

Synonyms
- Arthrostachya Link; Cylichnium Dulac; Falimiria Besser ex Rchb.; Meringurus Murb.

= Gaudinia =

Genus of plants

Gaudinia is a genus of Mediterranean plants in the grass family.

The genus name is a tribute to Swiss botanist Jean François Aimé Théophile Philippe Gaudin (1766-1833).

Species

- Gaudinia coarctata - Azores
- Gaudinia fragilis - Mediterranean + nearby regions from Portugal + Morocco to Turkey
- Gaudinia hispanica - Spain
- Gaudinia maroccana - Morocco

formerly included

see Helictochloa Ventenata

- Gaudinia biebersteinii - Ventenata macra
- Gaudinia fragilis - Ventenata macra
- Gaudinia planiculmis - Helictochloa planiculmis
- Gaudinia tenuis - Ventenata dubia
