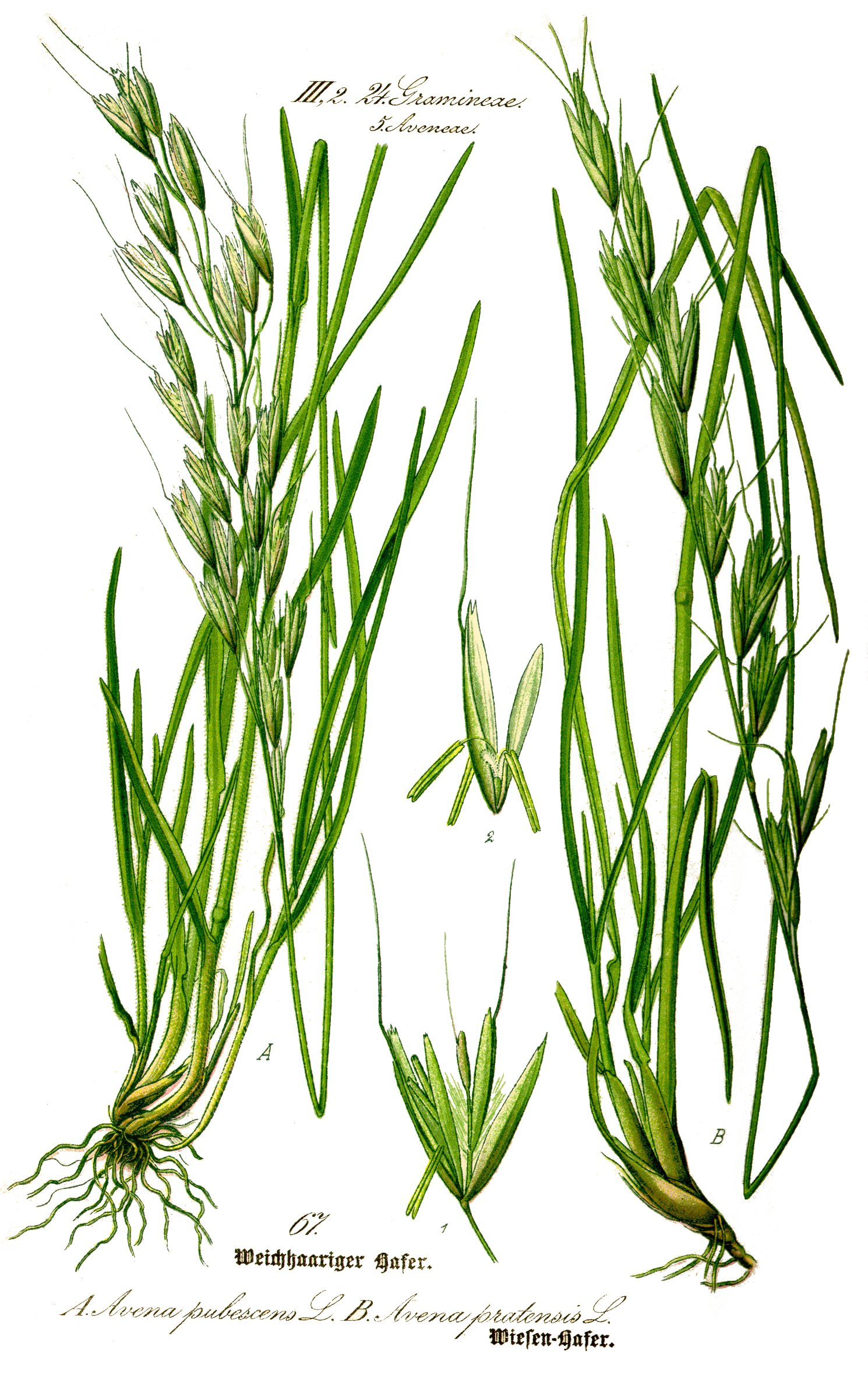
- Avenula pubescens

Scientific classification
- Kingdom: Plantae
- Clade: Embryophytes
- Clade: Tracheophytes
- Clade: Spermatophytes
- Clade: Angiosperms
- Clade: Monocots
- Clade: Commelinids
- Order: Poales
- Family: Poaceae
- Subfamily: Pooideae
- Supertribe: Poodae
- Tribe: Poeae
- Genus: Avenula (Dumort.) Dumort.
- Species: A. pubescens

Binomial name
- Avenula pubescens (Huds.)Dumort.

Synonyms
- Homalotrichon Banfi, Galasso & Bracchi; Trisetum sect. Avenula Dumort.; Helictotrichon sect. Avenula (Dumort.) Tzvelev; Avena pubescens Huds.; Trisetum pubescens (Huds.) Roem. & Schult.; Avenastrum pubescens (Huds.) Opiz; Heuffelia pubescens (Huds.) Schur; Arrhenatherum pubescens (Huds.) Samp.; Helictotrichon pubescens (Huds.) Pilg.; Avenochloa pubescens (Huds.) Holub; Homalotrichon pubescens (Huds.) Banfi; Neoholubia pubescens (Huds.) Tzvelev; Avena sesquitertia L.; Avena amethystina DC.; Avena alopecuros Roth; Avena carpatica Host; Trisetum sesquitertium (L.) P.Beauv.; Trisetaria carpatica (Host) Baumg.; Trisetaria sesquitertia (L.) Baumg.; Trisetum alopecuros (Roth) Roem. & Schult.; Trisetum carpaticum (Host) Roem. & Schult.; Avena lucida Bertol.; Avena glabra K.Koch; Avena baumgartenii Steud.; Avena hugeninii De Not. ex Steud.; Avena versicolor Baumg. ex Steud.; Avena hirtifolia Boiss.; Avena laevigata Schur; Avena pseudolucida Schur; Heuffelia laevigata (Schur) Schur; Heuffelia lucida (Bertol.) Schur; Avena balloniana Kirschl.; Avenastrum sesquitertium (L.) Fritsch; Avena insubrica (Asch. & Graebn.) Dalla Torre & Sarnth.; Trisetum bornmuelleri Domin; Avenastrum insubricum (Asch. & Graebn.) Fritsch; Avenastrum laevigatum (Schur) Domin; Helictotrichon laevigatum (Schur) Potztal; Trisetaria bornmuelleri (Domin) H.Scholz

= Avenula =

Genus of grasses

Avenula is a genus of Eurasian flowering plants in the grass family. Over 100 names have been proposed for species, subspecies, varieties, and other infraspecific taxa within Avenula, but only one species is accepted. The others names are all regarded as synonyms of other accepted names. The only recognized species in the genus is Avenula pubescens, commonly known as downy oat-grass or downy alpine oatgrass, native to Europe and Asia from Iceland and Portugal to Xinjiang, Mongolia, and Siberia. It is also naturalized in scattered locations in North America, in states as Connecticut, Delaware, Minnesota, New Jersey and Vermont, and in Canadian provinces such as Alberta, Manitoba, Ontario, Quebec, and Saskatchewan.

Other genera containing species once included in Avenula: Helictochloa, Helictotrichon and Tricholemma.

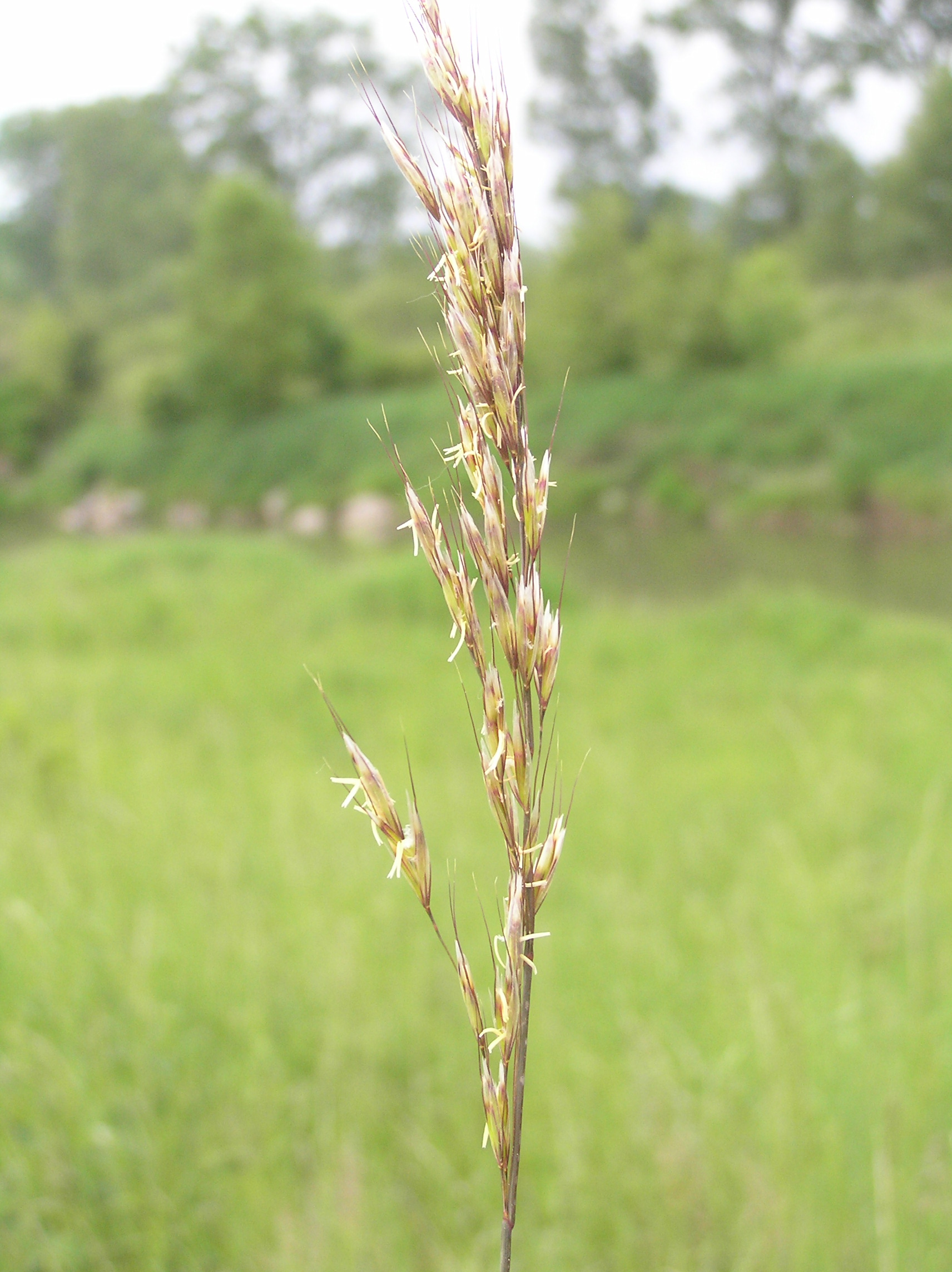
Avenula pubescens

== See also ==
- List of Poaceae genera
