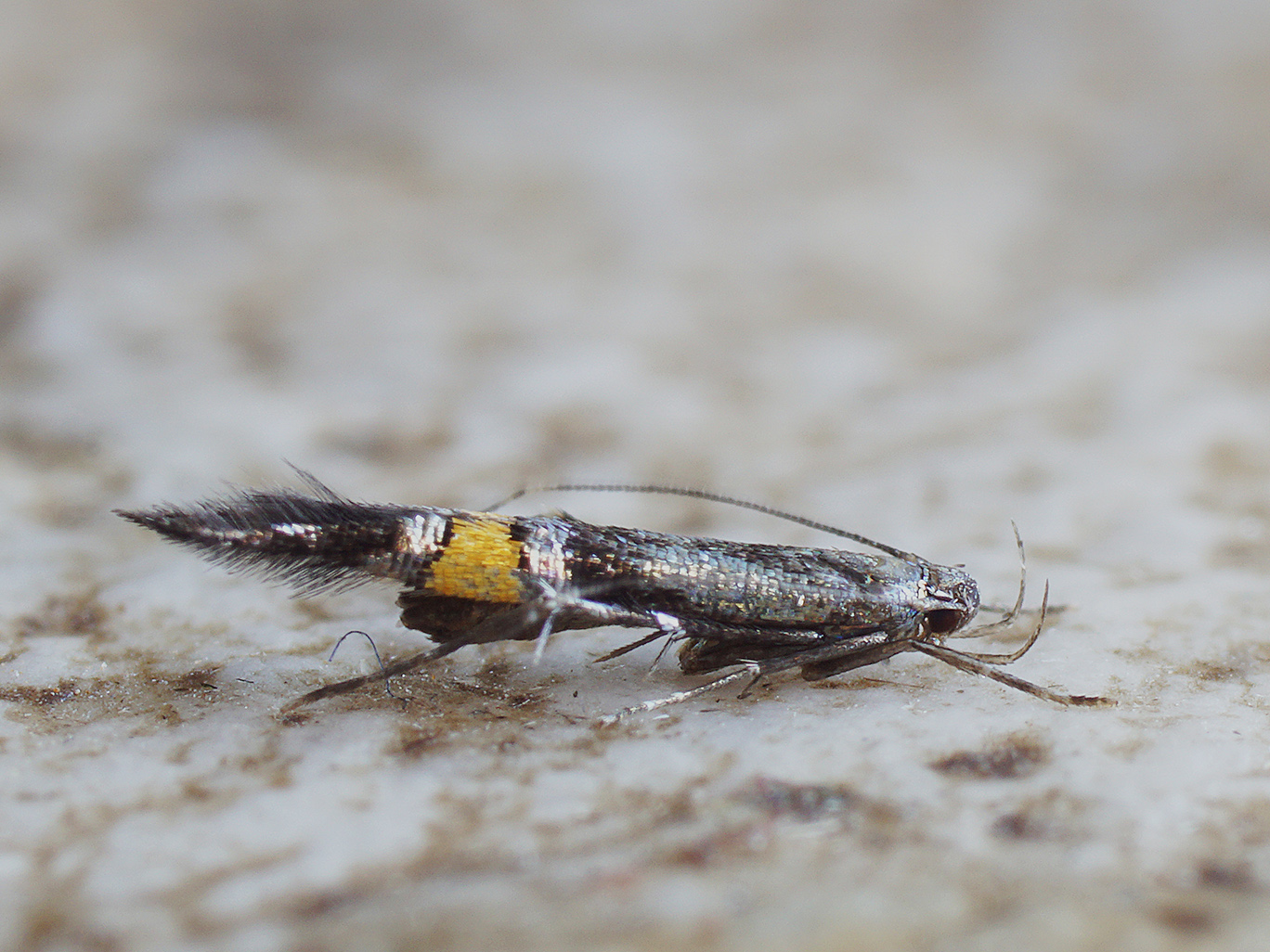
- Cosmopterix orichalcea Moscow Oblast, Russia
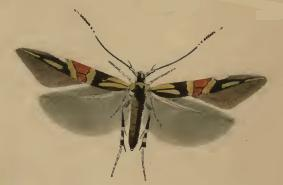

Scientific classification
- Kingdom: Animalia
- Phylum: Arthropoda
- Clade: Pancrustacea
- Class: Insecta
- Order: Lepidoptera
- Family: Cosmopterigidae
- Genus: Cosmopterix
- Species: C. orichalcea

Binomial name
- Cosmopterix orichalcea (Stainton, 1861)

Synonyms
- Cosmopteryx orichalcea Stainton, 1861; Cosmopteryx druryella Zeller, 1850; Cosmopterix singularis Sinev, 1979

= Cosmopterix orichalcea =

Species of moth

Cosmopterix orichalcea is a moth of the family Cosmopterigidae. It is known from most of Europe (except the Balkan Peninsula) east to Japan.

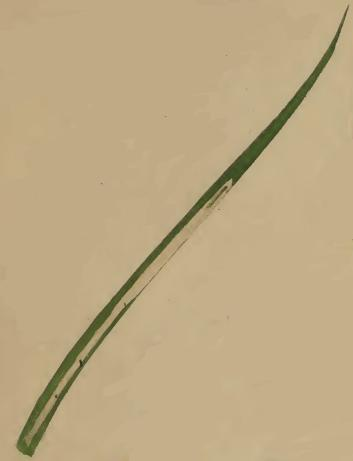
A mined leaf blade of Festuca arundinacea

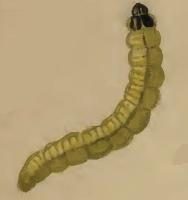
Larva

The wingspan is about 9 mm. The antennae with apex and two subapical rings white. Forewings black; a large brassy-metallic basal patch, edge very oblique; a broad orange fascia beyond middle, narrowed dorsally, edged with black scales and then with narrow violet-golden-metallic fasciae; a bluish-silvery-metallic sometimes interrupted streak along upper. The larva is pale yellow; dorsal line greenish; head black plate of 2 black, bisected.

Adults are on wing from August to May. Then the larva hibernates outside of the mine in a hibernaculum.

The larvae feed on Anthoxanthum odoratum, Festuca arundinacea, Hierochloe odorata, Milium species, Phalaris arundinacea and Phragmites australis. They mine the leaves of their host plant.
