= Laegaardia =

Conservation status
- Least Concern (IUCN 3.1)

Scientific classification
- Kingdom: Plantae
- Clade: Tracheophytes
- Clade: Angiosperms
- Clade: Monocots
- Clade: Commelinids
- Order: Poales
- Family: Poaceae
- Subfamily: Pooideae
- Tribe: Poeae
- Subtribe: Paramochloinae
- Genus: Laegaardia; P.M.Peterson, Soreng, Romasch. & Barberá
- Species: L. ecuadoriense

Binomial name
- Laegaardia ecuadoriense (Laegaard) P.M.Peterson, Soreng, Romasch. & Barberá

Synonyms
- Calamagrostis ecuadoriensis Laegaard

Genus of grasses

Laegaardia is a genus of grasses. It contains a single species, Laegaardia ecuadoriense (synonym Calamagrostis ecuadoriensis), a perennial endemic to Ecuador.
