= Ammochloa =

Scientific classification
- Kingdom: Plantae
- Clade: Tracheophytes
- Clade: Angiosperms
- Clade: Monocots
- Clade: Commelinids
- Order: Poales
- Family: Poaceae
- Subfamily: Pooideae
- Supertribe: Poodae
- Tribe: Poeae
- Subtribe: Ammochloinae; Tzvelev
- Genus: Ammochloa; Boiss.

Synonyms
- Cephalochloa Coss. & Durieu; Dictyochloa (Murb.) E.G.Camus

Genus of plants in the grass family

Ammochloa is a genus of Mediterranean plants in the grass family, Poaceae.

Species

- Ammochloa involucrata Murb. - Morocco
- Ammochloa palaestina Boiss. - Spain, Morocco, Algeria, Tunisia, Libya, Egypt, Palestine, Israel, Jordan, Lebanon, Syria, Turkey, Caucasus, Iraq, Iran, Kuwait
- Ammochloa pungens (Schreb.) Boiss. - Morocco, Algeria, Canary Islands

== See also ==
- List of Poaceae genera
