= Ancistragrostis =

Scientific classification
- Kingdom: Plantae
- Clade: Embryophytes
- Clade: Tracheophytes
- Clade: Spermatophytes
- Clade: Angiosperms
- Clade: Monocots
- Clade: Commelinids
- Order: Poales
- Family: Poaceae
- Subfamily: Pooideae
- Supertribe: Poodae
- Tribe: Poeae
- Subtribe: Echinopogoninae
- Genus: Ancistragrostis; S.T.Blake
- Species: A. uncinioides

Binomial name
- Ancistragrostis uncinioides S.T.Blake

Synonyms
- Calamagrostis uncinoides (S.T.Blake) Reeder; Deyeuxia uncinioides (S.T.Blake) P.Royen & Veldkamp

Genus of grasses

Ancistragrostis is a genus of Australian and New Guinean plants in the family Poaceae.

The only known species is Ancistragrostis uncinioides, native to Queensland, Australia, and Papua New Guinea.

== See also ==
- List of Poaceae genera
