= Pseudobromus =

Scientific classification
- Kingdom: Plantae
- Clade: Tracheophytes
- Clade: Angiosperms
- Clade: Monocots
- Clade: Commelinids
- Order: Poales
- Family: Poaceae
- Subfamily: Pooideae
- Supertribe: Poodae
- Tribe: Poeae
- Subtribe: Loliinae
- Genus: Pseudobromus; K.Schum.

Type species
- Pseudobromus silvaticus K.Schum.

Synonyms
- Brachyelytrum subgen. Pseudobromus (K.Schum.) Hack.

Genus of grasses

Pseudobromus is a genus of African plants in the grass family.

Species

- Pseudobromus africanus (Hack.) Stapf
- Pseudobromus ambilobensis A.Camus
- Pseudobromus breviligulatus Stapf ex A.Camus
- Pseudobromus engleri (Pilg.) Clayton
- Pseudobromus humbertianus A.Camus
- Pseudobromus tenuifolius A.Camus
