= Parvotrisetum =

Scientific classification
- Kingdom: Plantae
- Clade: Tracheophytes
- Clade: Angiosperms
- Clade: Monocots
- Clade: Commelinids
- Order: Poales
- Family: Poaceae
- Subfamily: Pooideae
- Tribe: Poeae
- Subtribe: Ventenatinae
- Genus: Parvotrisetum; Chrtek
- Species: P. myrianthum

Binomial name
- Parvotrisetum myrianthum (Bertol.) Chrtek

Synonyms
- Avena agrostoides Griseb.; Avena mediolanensis Balansa & De Not.; Avena myriantha Bertol. (1834) (basionym); Trisetum agrostoides (Griseb.) Steud.; Trisetaria myriantha (Bertol.) D.Heller; Trisetum myrianthum (Bertol.) C.A.Mey.

Genus of grasses

Parvotrisetum is a genus of grasses. It includes a single species, Parvotrisetum myrianthum, an annual native to southeastern Europe – mainland Italy, former Yugoslavia, Bulgaria, Greece and the East Aegean Islands, and European Turkey.
