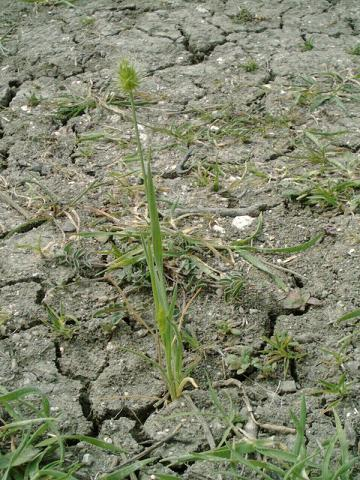

Scientific classification
- Kingdom: Plantae
- Clade: Tracheophytes
- Clade: Angiosperms
- Clade: Monocots
- Clade: Commelinids
- Order: Poales
- Family: Poaceae
- Subfamily: Pooideae
- Supertribe: Poodae
- Tribe: Poeae
- Subtribe: Sesleriinae
- Genus: Echinaria; Desf. [1799], nom. cons., non Fabric. 1759 (syn. of Cenchrus)
- Species: E. capitata

Binomial name
- Echinaria capitata (L.) Desf.

Synonyms
- Panicastrella Moench; Reimbolea Debeaux; Cenchrus capitatus L.; Panicastrella capitata (L.) Moench; Echinaria pumila Willk.; Echinaria capitata var. pumila (Willk.) Willk.; Echinaria capitata var. todaroana Ces.; Echinaria spicata Debeaux; Reimbolea spicata Debeaux; Echinaria todaroana (Ces.) Cif. & Giacom.

= Echinaria =

Genus of grasses

Echinaria is a genus of Eurasian and North African plants in the grass family. The only known species is Echinaria capitata, native to the Mediterranean Region as well as the Southwest and Central Asia (from Portugal and Morocco to Kazakhstan).
