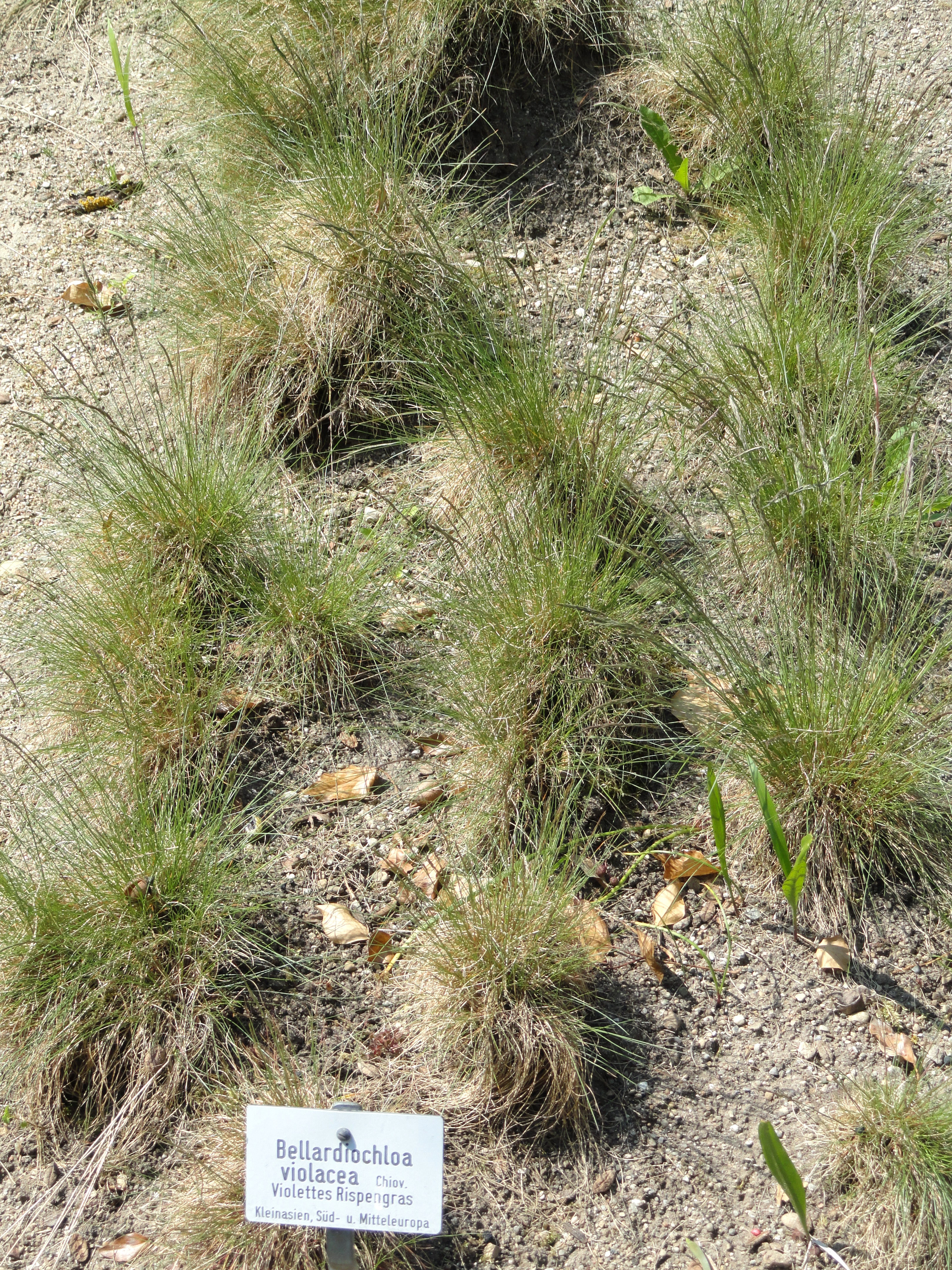
- Bellardiochloa violacea

Scientific classification
- Kingdom: Plantae
- Clade: Tracheophytes
- Clade: Angiosperms
- Clade: Monocots
- Clade: Commelinids
- Order: Poales
- Family: Poaceae
- Subfamily: Pooideae
- Supertribe: Poodae
- Tribe: Poeae
- Subtribe: Ventenatinae
- Genus: Bellardiochloa; Doll & Asch.

= Bellardiochloa =

Genus of grasses

Bellardiochloa is a genus of flowering plants in the grass family Poaceae. It is native to Europe and western Asia.

== Species ==
- Bellardiochloa argaea (Boiss. & Balansa) R.R.Mill 1985
- Bellardiochloa carica R.R. Mill 1985
- Bellardiochloa polychroa (Trautv.) Roshev. 1934
- Bellardiochloa variegata (Lam.) 1983
- Bellardiochloa violacea (Bellardi) Chiov.
