= Nephelochloa =

Scientific classification
- Kingdom: Plantae
- Clade: Embryophytes
- Clade: Tracheophytes
- Clade: Angiosperms
- Clade: Monocots
- Clade: Commelinids
- Order: Poales
- Family: Poaceae
- Subfamily: Pooideae
- Supertribe: Poodae
- Tribe: Poeae
- Subtribe: Ventenatinae
- Genus: Nephelochloa; Boiss.
- Species: N. orientalis

Binomial name
- Nephelochloa orientalis Boiss.

Synonyms
- Poa cilicensis Hance

Genus of flowering plants

Nephelochloa is a genus of flowering plant in the grass family, Poaceae. The only known species is Nephelochloa orientalis, found only in Turkey.
