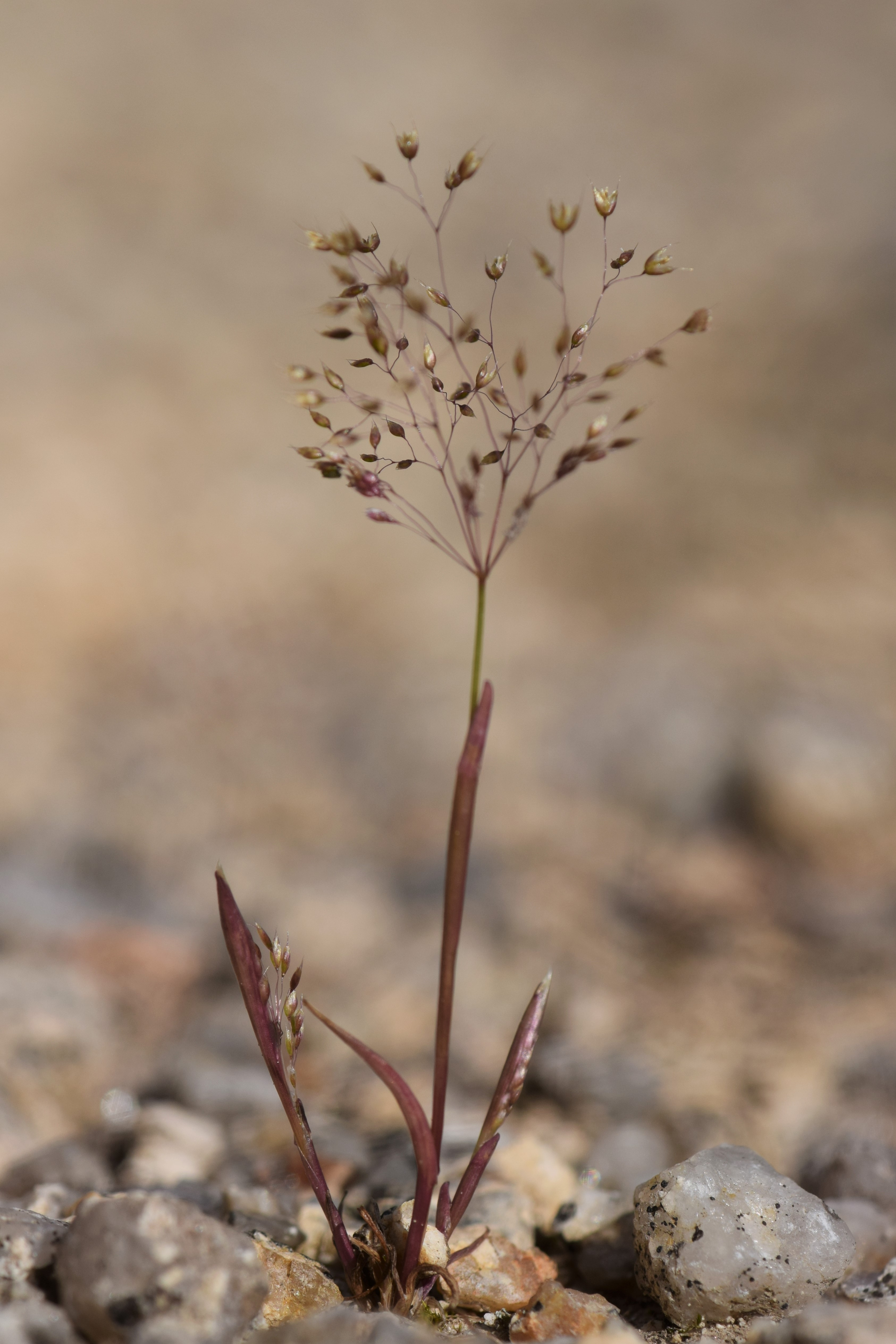
- Molineriella laevis

Scientific classification
- Kingdom: Plantae
- Clade: Tracheophytes
- Clade: Angiosperms
- Clade: Monocots
- Clade: Commelinids
- Order: Poales
- Family: Poaceae
- Subfamily: Pooideae
- Supertribe: Poodae
- Tribe: Poeae
- Subtribe: Airinae
- Genus: Molineriella; Rouy

Synonyms
- Molineria Parl.

= Molineriella =

Species of flowering plant

Molineriella is a genus of flowering plants belonging to the family Poaceae.

Its native range is Mediterranean Europe. It is found in the countries and regions of Albania, Algeria, Bulgaria, Corsica, East Aegean Islands, France, Greece, Italy, Crete, Crimea, Morocco, Portugal, Sardegna, Spain, Turkey and Yugoslavia.

The genus name Molineriella is in honour of Ignazio Bernardo Molineri (1741–1818), an Italian head gardener at a botanical garden in Turin. It was first described and published in G.Rouy & J.Foucaud, Fl. France Vol.14 on page 102 in 1913.

== Known species ==
According to Kew;

- Molineriella australis (Paunero) E.Rico
- Molineriella laevis (Brot.) Rouy
- Molineriella minuta (L.) Rouy
