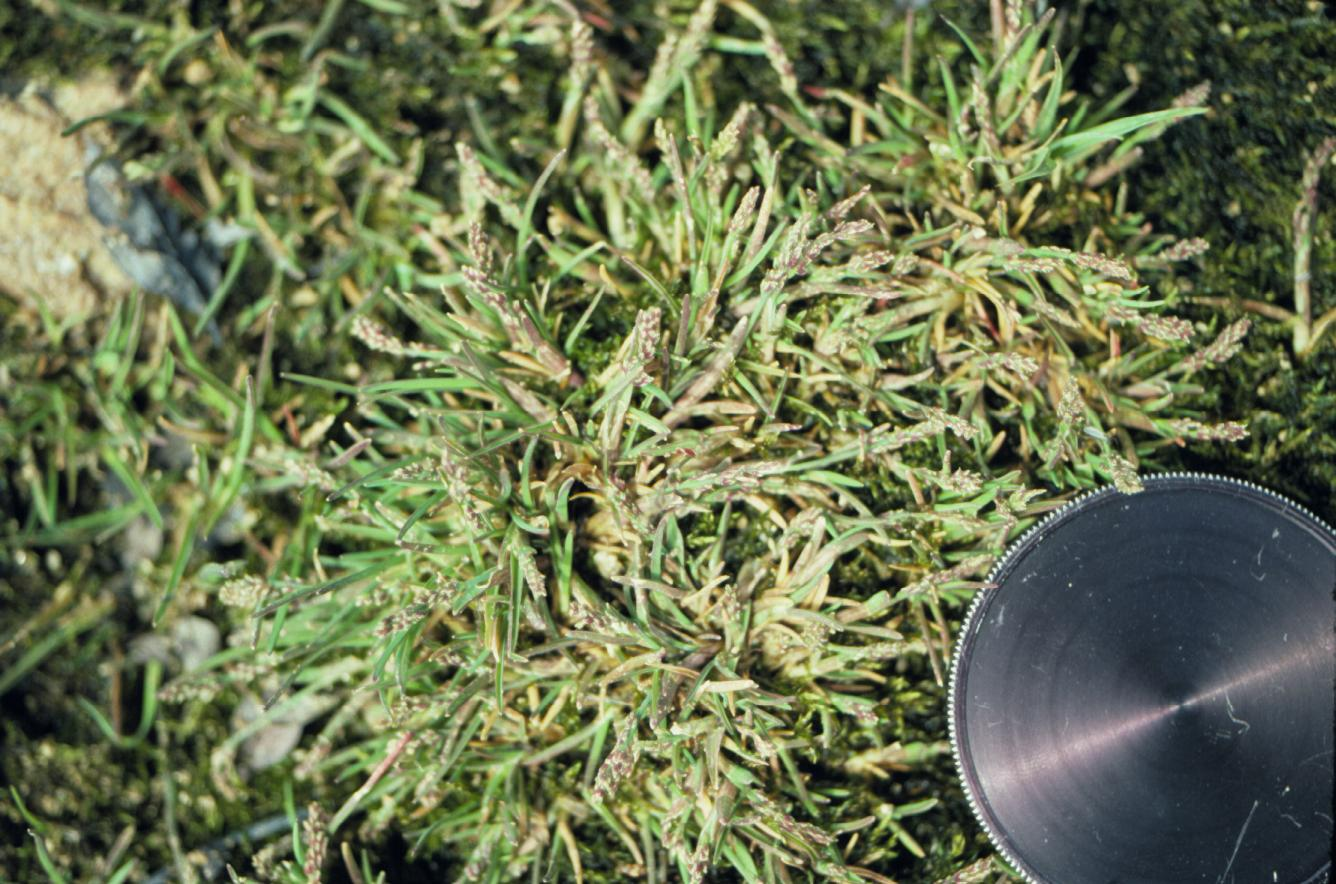
- Phippsia algida

Scientific classification
- Kingdom: Plantae
- Clade: Tracheophytes
- Clade: Angiosperms
- Clade: Monocots
- Clade: Commelinids
- Order: Poales
- Family: Poaceae
- Subfamily: Pooideae
- Supertribe: Poodae
- Tribe: Poeae
- Subtribe: Coleanthinae
- Genus: Phippsia; R.Br.

Type species
- Phippsia algida (Sol.) R.Br.

Synonyms
- Vilfa subg. Phippsia Trin.

= Phippsia =

Genus of grasses

Phippsia is a genus of Arctic and alpine plants in the grass family.

The genus is named in honour of Constantine Phipps, 2nd Baron Mulgrave, 1744-1792 a Royal Navy officer and Arctic explorer, and is commonly known as ice grass or snow grass.

Species

- Phippsia algida - Scandinavia (incl Iceland + Svalbard), Russia (northern European Russia, Krasnoyarsk, Western Siberia, Yakutia, Kamchatka, Khabarovsk, Magadan), Greenland, Canada (3 Arctic territories, British Columbia, Alberta, Ontario, Quebec, Labrador), United States (Alaska, Montana, Wyoming, Colorado)
- Phippsia concinna - Norway incl Svalbard, Sweden, Greenland, Quebec, Alaska, Russia (Magadan, Yakutia, Western Siberia, Krasnoyarsk, northern European Russia)
- Phippsia wilczekii - Mendoza Province in Argentina

formerly included

numerous species now considered better suited to other genera: Catabrosa Colpodium Puccinellia
