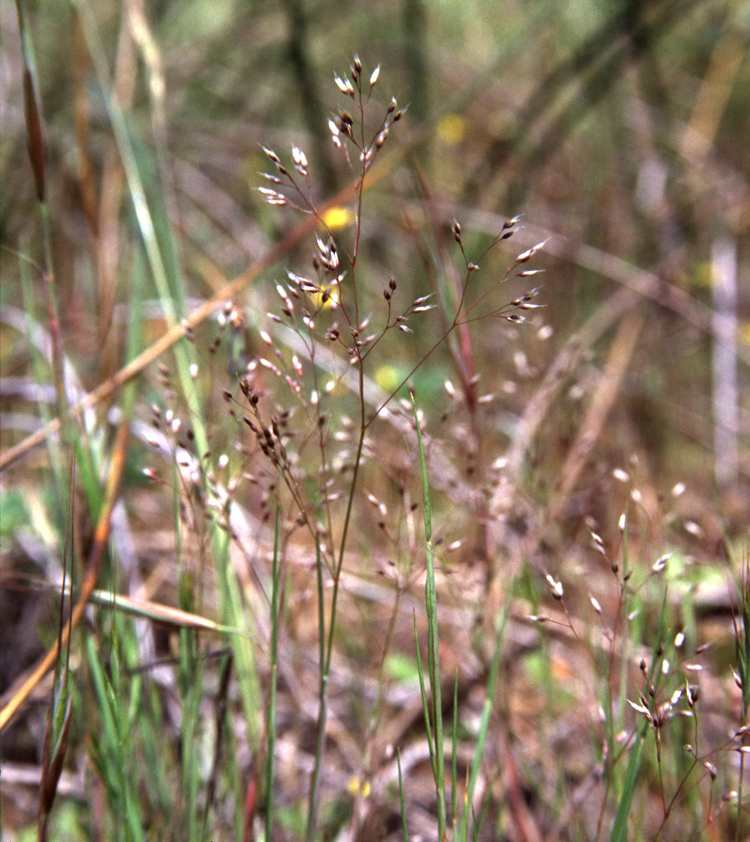
- Silver hairgrass (Aira caryophyllea)

Scientific classification
- Kingdom: Plantae
- Clade: Tracheophytes
- Clade: Angiosperms
- Clade: Monocots
- Clade: Commelinids
- Order: Poales
- Family: Poaceae
- Clade: BOP clade
- Subfamily: Pooideae
- Supertribe: Poodae; L.Liu
- Tribe: Poeae; R.Br. (1814)

Genera
- 121 genera, see text

Synonyms
- Agrostideae Martinov (1820); Agrostidieae Dumort. (1824); Airopsideae Gren. & Godr. (1855); Alopecureae W.D.J. Koch (1837); Anthoxantheae Link ex Endl. (1830); Aveneae Dumort. (1824); Beckmannieae Nevski (1937); Calamagrostideae Trin. (1824); Cinneae Ohwi (1941); Coleantheae Husn. (1896); Cynosureae Dumort. (1824); Dupontieae A. Löve & D. Löve (1961, nom. nud.); Festuceae Dumort. (1824); Gaudinieae Rouy (1913); Graphephoreae (Asch. & Graebn.) Hyl. (1953); Hainardieae Greuter (1967); Holceae J. Presl (1846); Lolieae Link ex Endl. (1830); Koelerieae Schur (1866, nom. nud.); Milieae Link ex Endl. (1830); Phalarideae Kunth (1829); Phleeae Dumort. (1824); Scolochloeae Tzvelev (1968); Seslerieae W.D.J. Koch (1837); Triseteae Gren. & Godr. (1855); Vilfeae Trin. (1824)

= Poeae =

Tribe of grasses

The Poeae are the largest tribe of the grasses, with around 2,500 species in 121 genera. The tribe includes many lawn and pasture grasses.

== Taxonomy ==
Two separate tribes, Poeae and Aveneae, used to be distinguished based on morphology, but phylogenetic analysis showed that they are intermingled. Poeae now includes the former Aveneae. Phylogenetic analyses identified two lineages based on chloroplast genomes. The genera are classified in 25 subtribes.

Reticulate evolution occurred repeatedly in the tribe.

=== Chloroplast group 1 ===
Anthoxanthinae

- Anthoxanthum (syn. Ataxia and Hierochloe R.Br.)

Aveninae

- Acrospelion Besser
- Arrhenatherum P.Beauv. (syn. Pseudarrhenatherum Rouy)
- Avellinia Parl.
- Avena L.
- Cinnagrostis Griseb.
- Gaudinia P.Beauv.
- Graphephorum Desv.
- Helictochloa Romero Zarco
- Helictotrichon Besser (syn. Neoholubia Tzvelev)
- Koeleria Pers. (syn. Leptophyllochloa Calderón ex Nicora)
- Lagurus L.
- Parafestuca E.B.Alexeev
- Peyritschia E.Fourn.
- Rostraria Trin.
- Sphenopholis Scribn.
- Tricholemma (Röser) Röser
- Trisetaria Forssk. (syn. Trichaeta P.Beauv.)
- Trisetopsis Röser & A.Wölk
- Trisetum Pers.
- Tzveleviochloa Röser & A.Wölk

Phalaridinae

- Phalaris (syn. Baldingera, Phalaroides, and Typhoides)

Torreyochloinae

- Amphibromus Nees
- Torreyochloa Church

Supersubtribe Agrostidodinae

Agrostidinae

- Agrostis L. (syns. Bromidium Nees & Meyen., Chaetopogon, Neoschischkinia, and Notonema)
- Calamagrostis Adans. (syn. Ammophila Host, Deyeuxia Clarion ex P.Beauv. Stylagrostis Mez)
- Gastridium P.Beauv.
- Hypseochloa C.E.Hubb.
- Lachnagrostis Trin.
- Limnodea L.H.Dewey
- Podagrostis (Griseb.) Scribn. & Merr.
- Polypogon Desf. (syn. Chaetotropis Kunth)
- Triplachne Link

Brizinae

- Airopsis Desv.
- Briza L. (syn. Macrobriza and Brizochloa V.Jirásek & Chrtek)

Calothecinae

- Boldrinia L.N.Silva
- Calotheca Desv.
- Chascolytrum Desv.
- Condilorachia P.M.Peterson, Romasch. & Soreng
- Erianthecium Parodi
- Lombardochloa Roseng. & B.R.Arrill.
- Microbriza Parodi ex Nicora & Rúgolo
- Poidium Nees
- Rhombolytrum Link
- Rosengurttia L.N.Silva

Echinopogoninae

- Ancistragrostis S.T.Blake
- Echinopogon P.Beauv.
- Pentapogon R.Br. (syn. Dichelachne Endl.)
- Relchela Steud.

Paramochloinae

- Laegaardia P.M.Peterson, Soreng, Romasch. & Barberá
- Paramochloa P.M.Peterson, Soreng, Romasch. & Barberá

=== Chloroplast group 2 ===
Airinae

- Aira L.
- Antinoria Parl.
- Avenella Bluff ex Drejer
- Corynephorus P.Beauv.
- Helictochloa Romero Zarco
- Molineriella Rouy
- Periballia Trin.

Aristaveninae

- Deschampsia P.Beauv. (syn. Aristavena F.Albers & Butzin, Scribneria Hack.)

Holcinae

- Holcus L.
- Vahlodea Fr.

Scolochloinae

- Dryopoa Vickery
- Scolochloa Link

Sesleriinae

- Echinaria Desf.
- Mibora Adans.
- Oreochloa Link
- Psilathera Link
- Sesleria Scop.
- Sesleriella Deyl

Supersubtribe Loliodinae

Ammochloinae

- Ammochloa Boiss.

Cynosurinae

- Ciliochloa Röser, Tkach & Rasti
- Cynosurus L.
- Falona Adans.

Dactylidinae

- Dactylis L.
- Lamarckia Moench

Loliinae

- Castellia Tineo
- Festuca Tourn. ex L. (syn. Ctenopsis, Dielsiochloa, Drymochloa Holub, Helleria, Hellerochloa, Leucopoa Griseb., Loliolum, Micropyrum, Narduroides, Podophorus Phil., Psilurus, Vulpia C.C.Gmel.)
- Lolium L. (syn. Micropyropsis, Schedonorus)
- Megalachne Steud.
- Patzkea G.H.Loos
- Pseudobromus K.Schum.
- Wangenheimia Moench

Parapholiinae

- Agropyropsis (Batt. & Trab.) A.Camus
- Catapodium Link
- Cutandia Willk.
- Desmazeria Dumort.
- Parapholis C.E.Hubb. (synonym Hainardia Greuter)
- Sphenopus Trin.
- Vulpiella (Batt. & Trab.) Burollet

PPAM Clade (including Poodinae)

Coleanthinae

- Catabrosa P.Beauv.
- Catabrosella (Tzvelev) Tzvelev
- Coleanthus Seidel ex Roem. & Schult.
- Colpodium Trin. (syn. Keniochloa Melderis, Zingeria P.A.Smirn.)
- Hyalopoa (Tzvelev) Tzvelev
- Paracolpodium (Tzvelev) Tzvelev
- Phippsia (Trin.) R.Br.
- Puccinellia Parl. (syn. Pseudosclerochloa Tzvelev)
- Sclerochloa (Tzvelev

subtribe incertae sedis

- Avenula (Dumort.) Dumort. (syn. Homalotrichon Banfi, Galasso & Bracchi)

Supersubtribe Poodinae

Alopecurinae

- Alopecurus L. (syn. Cornucopiae L.)
- Limnas Trin.

Beckmanniinae

- Beckmannia Host
- Pholiurus Trin.
- Pseudophleum Dogan
- Rhizocephalus Boiss.

Cinninae

- Agrostopoa Davidse, Soreng & P.M.Peterson
- Aniselytron Merr.
- Cinna L.
- Cyathopus Stapf
- Simplicia Kirk

Miliinae

- Milium L.

Phleinae

- Phleum L. (syn. Maillea Parl.)

Poinae

- Poa L. (syn. Anthochloa, Aphanelytrum, Austrofestuca, Dissanthelium Trin., Eremopoa, Libyella, Lindbergella, Neuropoa, Ochlopoa, Parodiochloa, Raimundochloa, Tovarochloa, Tzvelevia)

Ventenatinae

- Apera Adans.
- Bellardiochloa Chiov.
- Nephelochloa Boiss.
- Parvotrisetum Chrtek
- Ventenata (syn. Pilgerochloa Eig, Gaudinopsis (Boiss.) Eig)

subtribe incertae sedis

- Arctagrostis Griseb.
- Dupontia R.Br. (syn. Arctophila (Rupr.) Andersson)
- Dupontiopsis Soreng, L.J.Gillespie & Koba
- Hookerochloa E.B.Alexeev (syn. Festucella E.B.Alexeev)
- Nicoraepoa Soreng & L.J.Gillespie
- Oreopoa H.Scholz & Parolly
- Saxipoa Soreng, L.J.Gillespie & S.W.L.Jacobs
- Sylvipoa Soreng, L.J.Gillespie & S.W.L.Jacobs
