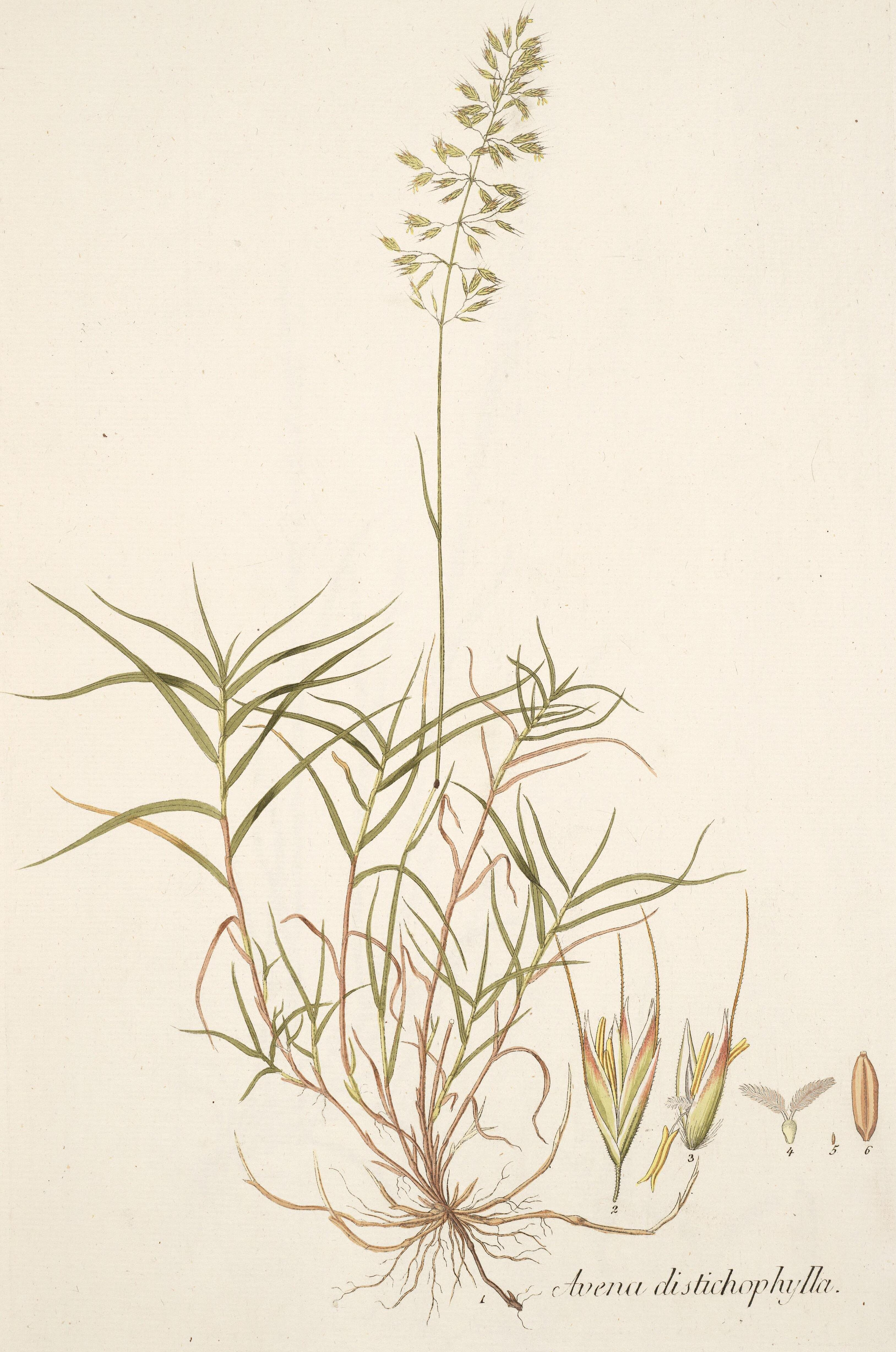
- Botanical illustration of Acrospelion distichophyllum

Scientific classification
- Kingdom: Plantae
- Clade: Embryophytes
- Clade: Tracheophytes
- Clade: Angiosperms
- Clade: Monocots
- Clade: Commelinids
- Order: Poales
- Family: Poaceae
- Subfamily: Pooideae
- Supertribe: Poodae
- Tribe: Poeae
- Subtribe: Aveninae
- Genus: Acrospelion; Besser (1827)

= Acrospelion =

Genus of flowering plants

Acrospelion is a genus of flowering plants in the grass family Poaceae, native to central Europe and the Balkans.

== Species ==
Two species are accepted:

- Acrospelion distichophyllum (Vill.) Barberá – France, Germany, Switzerland, Austria, Italy, Yugoslavia, Albania
- Acrospelion glaciale (Bory) Barberá, Soreng & Quintanar – Spain

== Taxonomy ==
It was first described by Wilibald Swibert Joseph Gottlieb von Besser in 1827.
