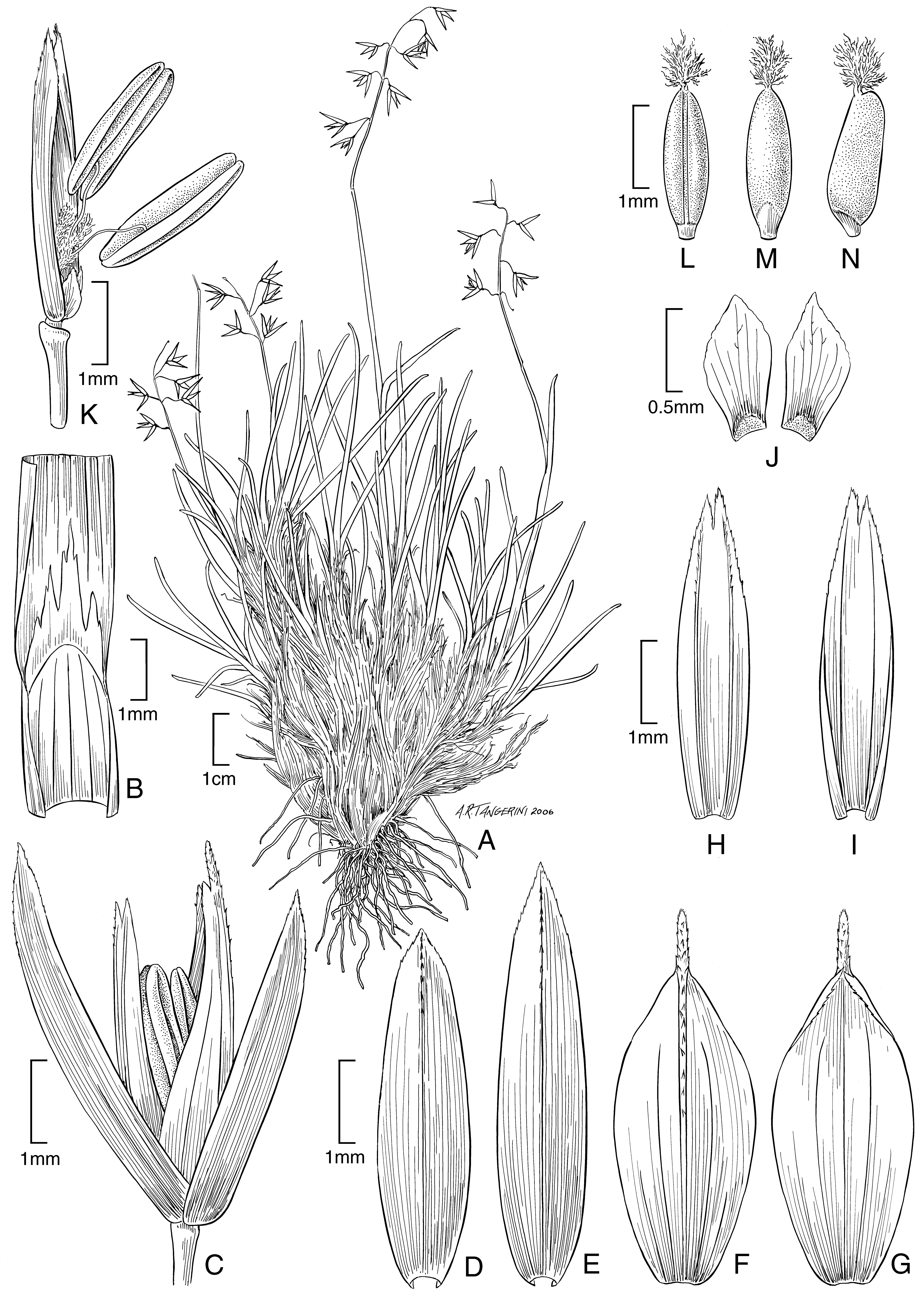
- Illustration of the type species Agrostopoa woodii from the protologue of the genus.

Scientific classification
- Kingdom: Plantae
- Clade: Tracheophytes
- Clade: Angiosperms
- Clade: Monocots
- Clade: Commelinids
- Order: Poales
- Family: Poaceae
- Subfamily: Pooideae
- Supertribe: Poodae
- Tribe: Poeae
- Subtribe: Cinninae
- Genus: Agrostopoa; Davidse, Soreng & P.M.Peterson

= Agrostopoa =

Genus of flowering plants

Agrostopoa is a genus of flowering plants belonging to the family Poaceae.

Its native range is Colombia.

Species:

- Agrostopoa barclayae Davidse, Soreng & P.M.Peterson
- Agrostopoa wallisii (Mez) P.M.Peterson, Davidse & Soreng
- Agrostopoa woodii Soreng, P.M.Peterson & Davidse
