= Pseudophleum =

Scientific classification
- Kingdom: Plantae
- Clade: Tracheophytes
- Clade: Angiosperms
- Clade: Monocots
- Clade: Commelinids
- Order: Poales
- Family: Poaceae
- Subfamily: Pooideae
- Supertribe: Poodae
- Tribe: Poeae
- Subtribe: Beckmanniinae
- Genus: Pseudophleum; Dogan

Genus of grasses

Pseudophleum is a genus of grasses. It includes two species endemic to Turkey.

- Pseudophleum anatolicum Dogan, Behçet & Sinan
- Pseudophleum gibbum (Boiss.) Dogan
