= Trisetopsis =

Scientific classification
- Kingdom: Plantae
- Clade: Tracheophytes
- Clade: Angiosperms
- Clade: Monocots
- Clade: Commelinids
- Order: Poales
- Family: Poaceae
- Subfamily: Pooideae
- Supertribe: Poodae
- Tribe: Poeae
- Subtribe: Aveninae
- Genus: Trisetopsis; Röser & A.Wölk (2013)

Genus of flowering plants

Trisetopsis is a genus of flowering plants belonging to the family Poaceae.

Its native range is Nigeria to Eritrea and Southern Africa, Madagascar, the southern Arabian Peninsula, China, tropical Asian mountains, and New Guinea.

== Species ==
25 species are currently accepted:

- Trisetopsis angusta (C.E.Hubb.) Röser & A.Wölk
- Trisetopsis arcta (Cope) Röser & A.Wölk
- Trisetopsis aspera (Munro ex Thwaites) Röser & A.Wölk
- Trisetopsis barbata (Nees) Röser & A.Wölk
- Trisetopsis capensis (Schweick.) Röser & A.Wölk
- Trisetopsis dodii (Stapf) Röser & A.Wölk
- Trisetopsis elongata (Hochst. ex A.Rich.) Röser & A.Wölk
- Trisetopsis galpinii (Schweick.) Röser & A.Wölk
- Trisetopsis hirtula (Steud.) Röser & A.Wölk
- Trisetopsis imberbis (Nees) Röser, A.Wölk & Veldkamp
- Trisetopsis junghuhnii (Buse) Röser & A.Wölk
- Trisetopsis lachnantha (Hochst. ex A.Rich.) Röser & A.Wölk
- Trisetopsis leonina (Steud.) Röser & A.Wölk
- Trisetopsis longa (Stapf) Röser & A.Wölk
- Trisetopsis longifolia (Nees) Röser & A.Wölk
- Trisetopsis mannii (Pilg.) Röser & A.Wölk
- Trisetopsis milanjiana (Rendle) Röser & A.Wölk
- Trisetopsis namaquensis (Schweick.) Röser & A.Wölk
- Trisetopsis natalensis (Stapf) Röser & A.Wölk
- Trisetopsis newtonii (Stapf) Röser & A.Wölk
- Trisetopsis quinqueseta (Steud.) Röser & A.Wölk
- Trisetopsis rogerellisii (Mashau, Fish & A.E.van Wyk) Röser & A.Wölk
- Trisetopsis roggeveldensis (Mashau, Fish & A.E.van Wyk) Röser & A.Wölk
- Trisetopsis umbrosa (Hochst. ex Steud.) Röser & A.Wölk
- Trisetopsis virescens (Nees ex Steud.) Röser & A.Wölk
