= Oreopoa =

Scientific classification
- Kingdom: Plantae
- Clade: Tracheophytes
- Clade: Angiosperms
- Clade: Monocots
- Clade: Commelinids
- Order: Poales
- Family: Poaceae
- Subfamily: Pooideae
- Supertribe: Poodae
- Tribe: Poeae
- Subtribe: Poinae
- Genus: Oreopoa; H.Scholz & Parolly
- Species: O. anatolica

Binomial name
- Oreopoa anatolica H.Scholz & Parolly

Genus of plants

Oreopoa is a genus of flowering plants belonging to the family Poaceae. It contains a single species, Oreopoa anatolica.

Its native range is Turkey.
