= Nicoraepoa =

Scientific classification
- Kingdom: Plantae
- Clade: Tracheophytes
- Clade: Angiosperms
- Clade: Monocots
- Clade: Commelinids
- Order: Poales
- Family: Poaceae
- Subfamily: Pooideae
- Supertribe: Poodae
- Tribe: Poeae
- Subtribe: Poinae
- Genus: Nicoraepoa; Soreng & L.J.Gillespie

Genus of grasses

Nicoraepoa is a genus of grasses. It includes seven species native to southern South America, including northeastern and southern Argentina, central and southern Chile, and the Falkland Islands.

== Species ==
Seven species are accepted.

- Nicoraepoa andina (Trin.) Soreng & L.J.Gillespie
- Nicoraepoa chonotica (Phil.) Soreng & L.J.Gillespie
- Nicoraepoa erinacea (Speg.) Soreng & L.J.Gillespie
- Nicoraepoa pugionifolia (Speg.) Soreng & L.J.Gillespie
- Nicoraepoa robusta (Steud.) Soreng & L.J.Gillespie
- Nicoraepoa stepparia (Nicora) Soreng
- Nicoraepoa subenervis (Hack.) Soreng & L.J.Gillespie
