= Cyathopus =

Scientific classification
- Kingdom: Plantae
- Clade: Tracheophytes
- Clade: Angiosperms
- Clade: Monocots
- Clade: Commelinids
- Order: Poales
- Family: Poaceae
- Subfamily: Pooideae
- Supertribe: Poodae
- Tribe: Poeae
- Subtribe: Cinninae
- Genus: Cyathopus; Stapf
- Species: C. sikkimensis

Binomial name
- Cyathopus sikkimensis Stapf

Genus of grasses

Cyathopus is a genus of Himalayan plants in the grass family. The only known species is Cyathopus sikkimensis, native to the mountains of Bhutan, Yunnan, Sikkim, Nepal, Uttarakhand, and nearby regions.
