= Sylvipoa =

Scientific classification
- Kingdom: Plantae
- Clade: Tracheophytes
- Clade: Angiosperms
- Clade: Monocots
- Clade: Commelinids
- Order: Poales
- Family: Poaceae
- Subfamily: Pooideae
- Supertribe: Poodae
- Tribe: Poeae
- Genus: Sylvipoa; Soreng, L.J.Gillespie & S.W.L.Jacobs (2009)
- Species: S. queenslandica

Binomial name
- Sylvipoa queenslandica (C.E.Hubb.) Soreng, L.J.Gillespie & S.W.L.Jacobs (2009)

Synonyms
- Poa queenslandica C.E.Hubb. (1934)

Genus of flowering plants

Sylvipoa is a genus of flowering plants belonging to the family Poaceae. It contains a single species, Sylvipoa queenslandica.

It is a perennial grass native to Eastern Australia. Its native range includes portions of Queensland and New South Wales, and it has been introduced to Victoria.
