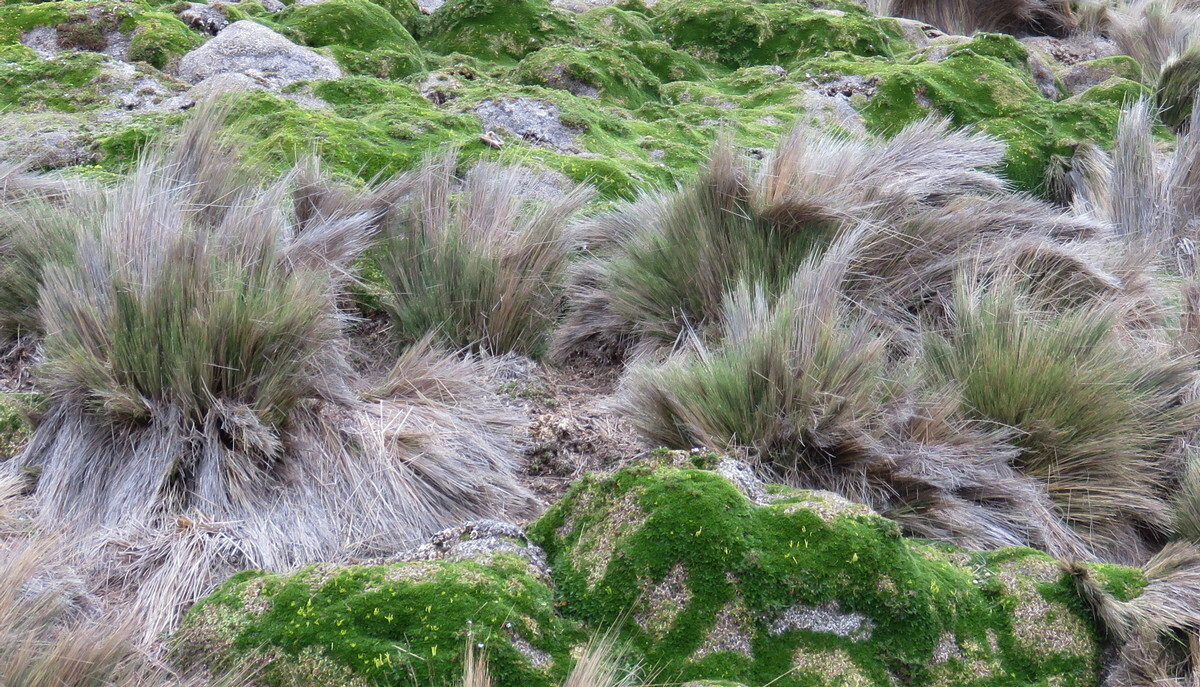
- Cinnagrostis intermedia

Scientific classification
- Kingdom: Plantae
- Clade: Tracheophytes
- Clade: Angiosperms
- Clade: Monocots
- Clade: Commelinids
- Order: Poales
- Family: Poaceae
- Subfamily: Pooideae
- Supertribe: Poodae
- Tribe: Poeae
- Subtribe: Agrostidinae
- Genus: Cinnagrostis; Griseb.

= Cinnagrostis =

Genus of grasses

Cinnagrostis is a genus of grasses. It includes 62 species which range from southern Mexico to southern Argentina and Chile.

== Species ==
62 species are accepted.

- Cinnagrostis alba (J.Presl) P.M.Peterson, Soreng, Romasch. & Barberá
- Cinnagrostis boliviensis (Hack.) P.M.Peterson, Soreng, Romasch. & Barberá
- Cinnagrostis breviaristata (Wedd.) P.M.Peterson, Soreng, Romasch. & Barberá
- Cinnagrostis brevifolia (J.Presl) P.M.Peterson, Soreng, Romasch. & Barberá
- Cinnagrostis cabrerae (Parodi) P.M.Peterson, Soreng, Romasch. & Barberá
- Cinnagrostis calderillensis (Pilg.) P.M.Peterson, Soreng, Romasch. & Barberá
- Cinnagrostis chrysophylla (Phil.) P.M.Peterson, Soreng, Romasch. & Barberá
- Cinnagrostis ciliata (Rúgolo & Villav.) P.M.Peterson, Soreng, Romasch. & Barberá
- Cinnagrostis coarctata (Kunth) P.M.Peterson, Soreng, Romasch. & Barberá
- Cinnagrostis crispa (Rúgolo & Villav.) P.M.Peterson, Soreng, Romasch. & Barberá
- Cinnagrostis cryptolopha (Wedd.) P.M.Peterson, Soreng, Romasch. & Barberá
- Cinnagrostis curta (Wedd.) P.M.Peterson, Soreng, Romasch. & Barberá
- Cinnagrostis curvula (Wedd.) P.M.Peterson, Soreng, Romasch. & Barberá
- Cinnagrostis cuzcoensis (Tovar) P.M.Peterson, Soreng, Romasch. & Barberá
- Cinnagrostis densiflora (J.Presl) P.M.Peterson, Soreng, Romasch. & Barberá
- Cinnagrostis deserticola (Phil.) P.M.Peterson, Soreng, Romasch. & Barberá
- Cinnagrostis divergens (Swallen) P.M.Peterson, Soreng, Romasch. & Barberá
- Cinnagrostis fiebrigii (Pilg.) P.M.Peterson, Soreng, Romasch. & Barberá
- Cinnagrostis filifolia (Wedd.) P.M.Peterson, Soreng, Romasch. & Barberá
- Cinnagrostis fuscata (J.Presl) P.M.Peterson, Soreng, Romasch. & Barberá
- Cinnagrostis glacialis (Wedd.) P.M.Peterson, Soreng, Romasch. & Barberá
- Cinnagrostis heterophylla (Wedd.) P.M.Peterson, Soreng, Romasch. & Barberá
- Cinnagrostis hieronymi (Hack.) P.M.Peterson, Soreng, Romasch. & Barberá
- Cinnagrostis hirsuta (Rúgolo & Villav.) P.M.Peterson, Soreng, Romasch. & Barberá
- Cinnagrostis hirta (Sodiro ex Mille) P.M.Peterson, Soreng, Romasch. & Barberá
- Cinnagrostis intermedia (J.Presl) P.M.Peterson, Soreng, Romasch. & Barberá
- Cinnagrostis involuta (Swallen) P.M.Peterson, Soreng, Romasch. & Barberá
- Cinnagrostis jamesonii (Steud.) P.M.Peterson, Soreng, Romasch. & Barberá
- Cinnagrostis lagurus (Wedd.) P.M.Peterson, Soreng, Romasch. & Barberá
- Cinnagrostis leiophylla (Wedd.) P.M.Peterson, Soreng, Romasch. & Barberá
- Cinnagrostis macrophylla (Pilg.) P.M.Peterson, Soreng, Romasch. & Barberá
- Cinnagrostis macrostachya (Sodiro) P.M.Peterson, Soreng, Romasch. & Barberá
- Cinnagrostis malamalensis (Hack.) P.M.Peterson, Soreng, Romasch. & Barberá
- Cinnagrostis mandoniana (Wedd.) P.M.Peterson, Soreng, Romasch. & Barberá
- Cinnagrostis micrathera (É.Desv.) P.M.Peterson, Soreng, Romasch. & Barberá
- Cinnagrostis minima (Pilg.) P.M.Peterson, Soreng, Romasch. & Barberá
- Cinnagrostis mollis (Pilg.) P.M.Peterson, Soreng, Romasch. & Barberá
- Cinnagrostis mulleri (Luces) P.M.Peterson, Soreng, Romasch. & Barberá
- Cinnagrostis nitidula (Pilg.) P.M.Peterson, Soreng, Romasch. & Barberá
- Cinnagrostis orbignyana (Wedd.) P.M.Peterson, Soreng, Romasch. & Barberá
- Cinnagrostis patagonica (Speg.) P.M.Peterson, Soreng, Romasch. & Barberá
- Cinnagrostis polygama Griseb.
- Cinnagrostis preslii (Kunth) P.M.Peterson, Soreng, Romasch. & Barberá
- Cinnagrostis rauhii (Tovar) P.M.Peterson, Soreng, Romasch. & Barberá
- Cinnagrostis recta (Kunth) P.M.Peterson, Soreng, Romasch. & Barberá
- Cinnagrostis reitzii (Swallen) P.M.Peterson, Soreng, Romasch. & Barberá
- Cinnagrostis rigescens (J.Presl) P.M.Peterson, Soreng, Romasch. & Barberá
- Cinnagrostis rigida (Kunth) P.M.Peterson, Soreng, Romasch. & Barberá
- Cinnagrostis rosea (Griseb.) P.M.Peterson, Soreng, Romasch. & Barberá
- Cinnagrostis rupestris (Trin.) P.M.Peterson, Soreng, Romasch. & Barberá
- Cinnagrostis scaberula (Swallen) P.M.Peterson, Soreng, Romasch. & Barberá
- Cinnagrostis sclerantha (Hack.) P.M.Peterson, Soreng, Romasch. & Barberá
- Cinnagrostis setiflora (Wedd.) P.M.Peterson, Soreng, Romasch. & Barberá
- Cinnagrostis spicigera (J.Presl) P.M.Peterson, Soreng, Romasch. & Barberá
- Cinnagrostis steyermarkii (Swallen) P.M.Peterson, Soreng, Romasch. & Barberá
- Cinnagrostis tarmensis (Pilg.) P.M.Peterson, Soreng, Romasch. & Barberá
- Cinnagrostis trichodonta (Wedd.) P.M.Peterson, Soreng, Romasch. & Barberá
- Cinnagrostis velutina (Nees & Meyen) P.M.Peterson, Soreng, Romasch. & Barberá
- Cinnagrostis vicunarum (Wedd.) P.M.Peterson, Soreng, Romasch. & Barberá
- Cinnagrostis violacea (Wedd.) P.M.Peterson, Soreng, Romasch. & Barberá
- Cinnagrostis viridiflavescens (Poir.) P.M.Peterson, Soreng, Romasch. & Barberá
- Cinnagrostis viridis (Phil.) P.M.Peterson, Soreng, Romasch. & Barberá
