= Jean François Aimé Théophile Philippe Gaudin =

Swiss pastor and botanist

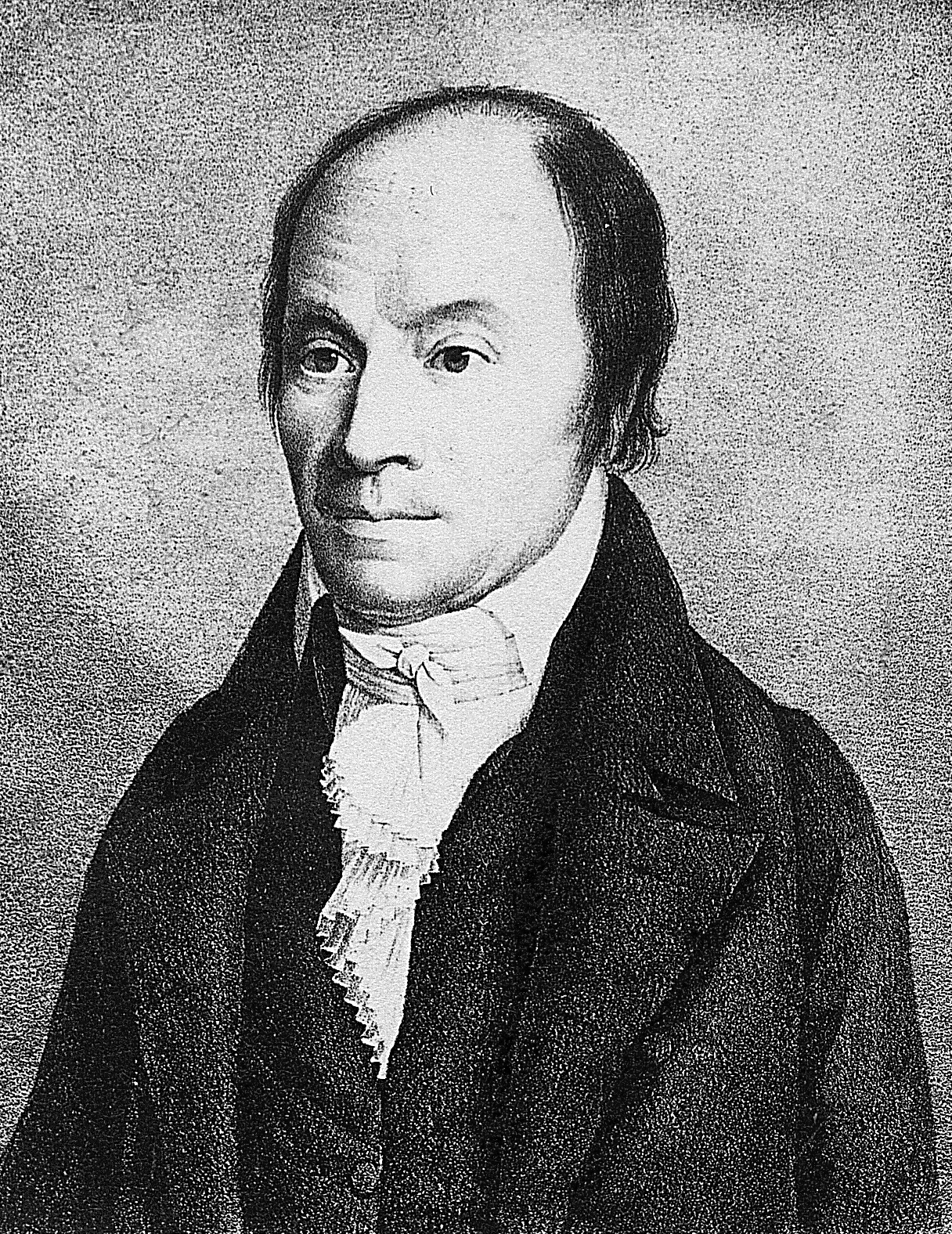
Jean François Aimé Théophile Philippe Gaudin

Jean François Aimé Théophile Philippe Gaudin or Jean François Aimée Gottlieb Philippe Gaudin (18 March 1766 in Longirod, canton de Vaud - 14 July 1833 in Nyon) was a Swiss pastor, professor and botanist. He was the author of the monumental Flora Helvetica in 7 volumes.

== Tributes ==
The annual grass genus Gaudinia, belonging to the Poeae, was named after his honor.

== See also ==
- Jaques Étienne Gay (1786-1864), a Swiss-French botanist and one of the most famous students of botanist Jean François Aimée Gaudin
