= Dryopoa =

Giant mountain grass

Scientific classification
- Kingdom: Plantae
- Clade: Tracheophytes
- Clade: Angiosperms
- Clade: Monocots
- Clade: Commelinids
- Order: Poales
- Family: Poaceae
- Subfamily: Pooideae
- Supertribe: Poodae
- Tribe: Poeae
- Subtribe: Scolochloinae
- Genus: Dryopoa; Vickery
- Species: D. dives

Binomial name
- Dryopoa dives (F.Muell.) Vickery

Synonyms
- Festuca dives F.Muell.; Glyceria dives (F.Muell.) F.Muell. ex Benth.; Poa dives (F.Muell.) F.Muell.; Panicularia dives (F.Muell.) Kuntze

Genus of grasses

Dryopoa, or giant mountain grass, is a genus of Australian plants in the grass family.

The only known species is Dryopoa dives, native to New South Wales, Tasmania, and Victoria. The name Dryopoa (tree-grass) is derived from the Greek language, with dryos meaning tree and poa meaning grass.
