= Dupontiopsis =

Scientific classification
- Kingdom: Plantae
- Clade: Tracheophytes
- Clade: Angiosperms
- Clade: Monocots
- Clade: Commelinids
- Order: Poales
- Family: Poaceae
- Subfamily: Pooideae
- Supertribe: Poodae
- Tribe: Poeae
- Genus: Dupontiopsis; Soreng, L.J.Gillespie & Koba
- Species: D. hayachinensis

Binomial name
- Dupontiopsis hayachinensis (Koidz.) Soreng, L.J.Gillespie & Koba

Genus of plants

Dupontiopsis is a monotypic genus of flowering plants belonging to the family Poaceae. The only species is Dupontiopsis hayachinensis.

Its native range is Japan.
