= Paracolpodium =

Scientific classification
- Kingdom: Plantae
- Clade: Embryophytes
- Clade: Tracheophytes
- Clade: Spermatophytes
- Clade: Angiosperms
- Clade: Monocots
- Clade: Commelinids
- Order: Poales
- Family: Poaceae
- Subfamily: Pooideae
- Supertribe: Poodae
- Tribe: Poeae
- Subtribe: Coleanthinae
- Genus: Paracolpodium (Tzvelev) Tzvelev

Genus of grasses

Paracolpodium is a genus of grasses. It includes three species native to Asia, ranging from Afghanistan and the Himalayas to eastern Central Asia, Mongolia, and central Siberia.

- Paracolpodium altaicum (Trin.) Tzvelev
- Paracolpodium tibeticum (Bor) E.B.Alexeev
- Paracolpodium wallichii (Stapf) E.B.Alexeev
