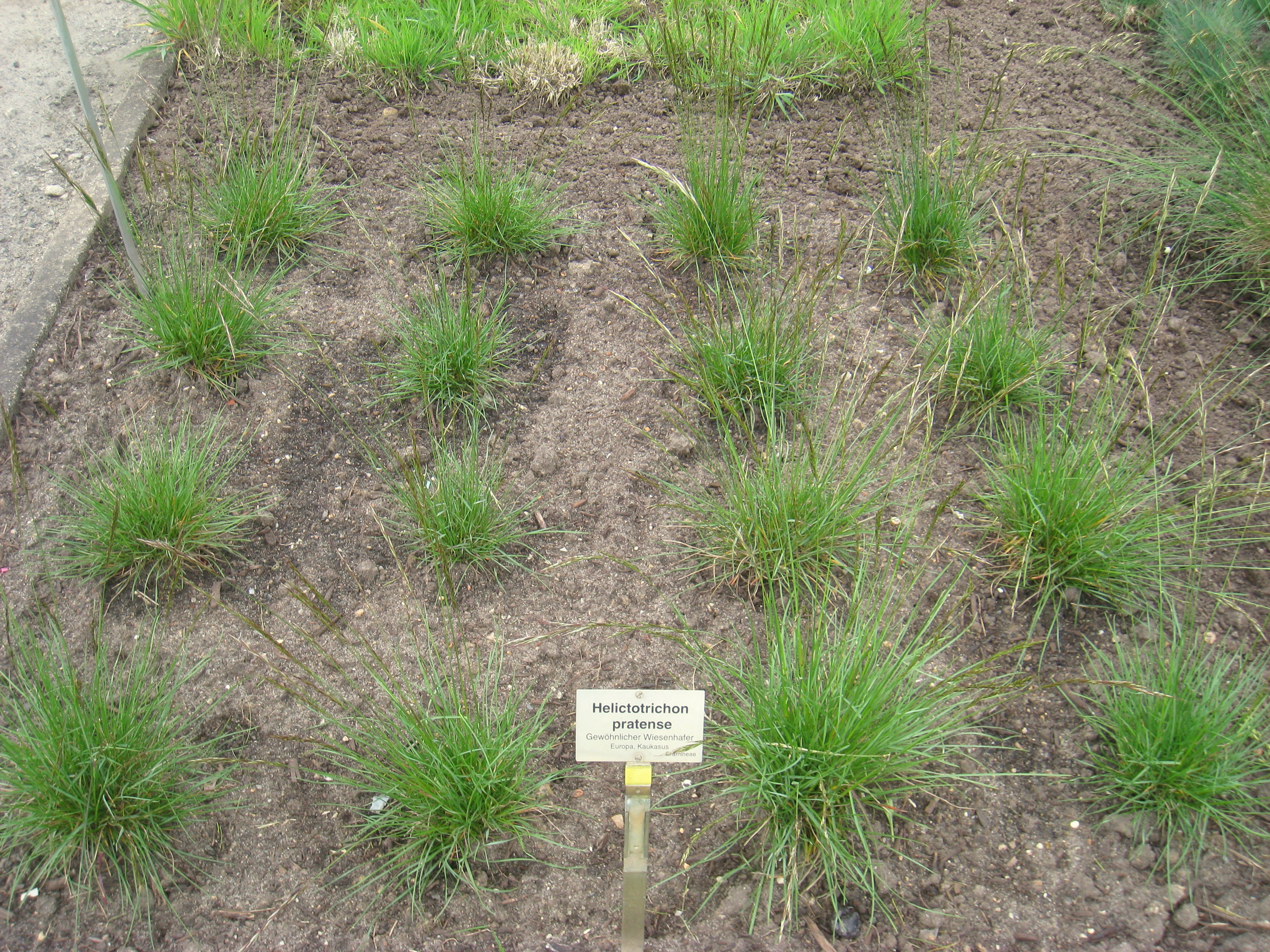

Scientific classification
- Kingdom: Plantae
- Clade: Tracheophytes
- Clade: Angiosperms
- Clade: Monocots
- Clade: Commelinids
- Order: Poales
- Family: Poaceae
- Subfamily: Pooideae
- Genus: Helictochloa
- Species: H. pratensis

Binomial name
- Helictochloa pratensis (L.) Romero Zarco

Synonyms
- List: Arrhenatherum pratense (L.) Samp.; Avena pratensis L.; Avena pratensis var. minor Roth; Avenastrum pratense (L.) Opiz; Avenochloa pratensis (L.) Holub; Avenula pratensis (L.) Dumort.; Helictotrichon pratense (L.) Pilg.; Heuffelia pratensis (L.) Schur; Trisetum pratense (L.) Dumort.; Avena pratensis f. pauciflora Norm.; Avena pratensis f. spiculosa Neuman; Avenastrum pratense f. spiculosum (Neuman) Neuman

= Helictochloa pratensis =

Species of grass

Helictochloa pratensis, known as meadow oat-grass, is a species of perennial flowering plant in the grass family Poaceae, found in temperate parts of Europe and Asia. Its culms are erect and 30–85 cm long; leaves are mostly basal. It is restricted to shallow, calcareous soils such as those formed on chalk and limestone substrates.
