= Saxipoa =

Scientific classification
- Kingdom: Plantae
- Clade: Tracheophytes
- Clade: Angiosperms
- Clade: Monocots
- Clade: Commelinids
- Order: Poales
- Family: Poaceae
- Subfamily: Pooideae
- Supertribe: Poodae
- Tribe: Poeae
- Genus: Saxipoa; Soreng, L.J.Gillespie & S.W.L.Jacobs (2009)
- Species: S. saxicola

Binomial name
- Saxipoa saxicola (R.Br.) Soreng, L.J.Gillespie & S.W.L.Jacobs (2009)

Synonyms
- Poa saxicola R.Br. (1810)

Genus of plants

Saxipoa is a monotypic genus of flowering plants belonging to the family Poaceae. The only species is Saxipoa saxicola.

It is a perennial grass native to southeastern Australia (New South Wales, Victoria, and Tasmania).
