= Hookerochloa =

Scientific classification
- Kingdom: Plantae
- Clade: Tracheophytes
- Clade: Angiosperms
- Clade: Monocots
- Clade: Commelinids
- Order: Poales
- Family: Poaceae
- Subfamily: Pooideae
- Supertribe: Poodae
- Tribe: Poeae
- Genus: Hookerochloa; E.B.Alexeev

Type species
- Hookerochloa hookeriana (F.Muell. ex Hook.f.) E.B.Alexeev

Synonyms
- Festucella E.B.Alexeev

Genus of grasses

Hookerochloa is a genus of plants in the grass family Poaceae.

Species

- Hookerochloa eriopoda (Vickery) S.W.L.Jacobs - Queensland, New South Wales, Victoria
- Hookerochloa hookeriana (F.Muell. ex Hook.f.) E.B.Alexeev - New South Wales, Victoria, Tasmania

== See also ==
- List of Poaceae genera
