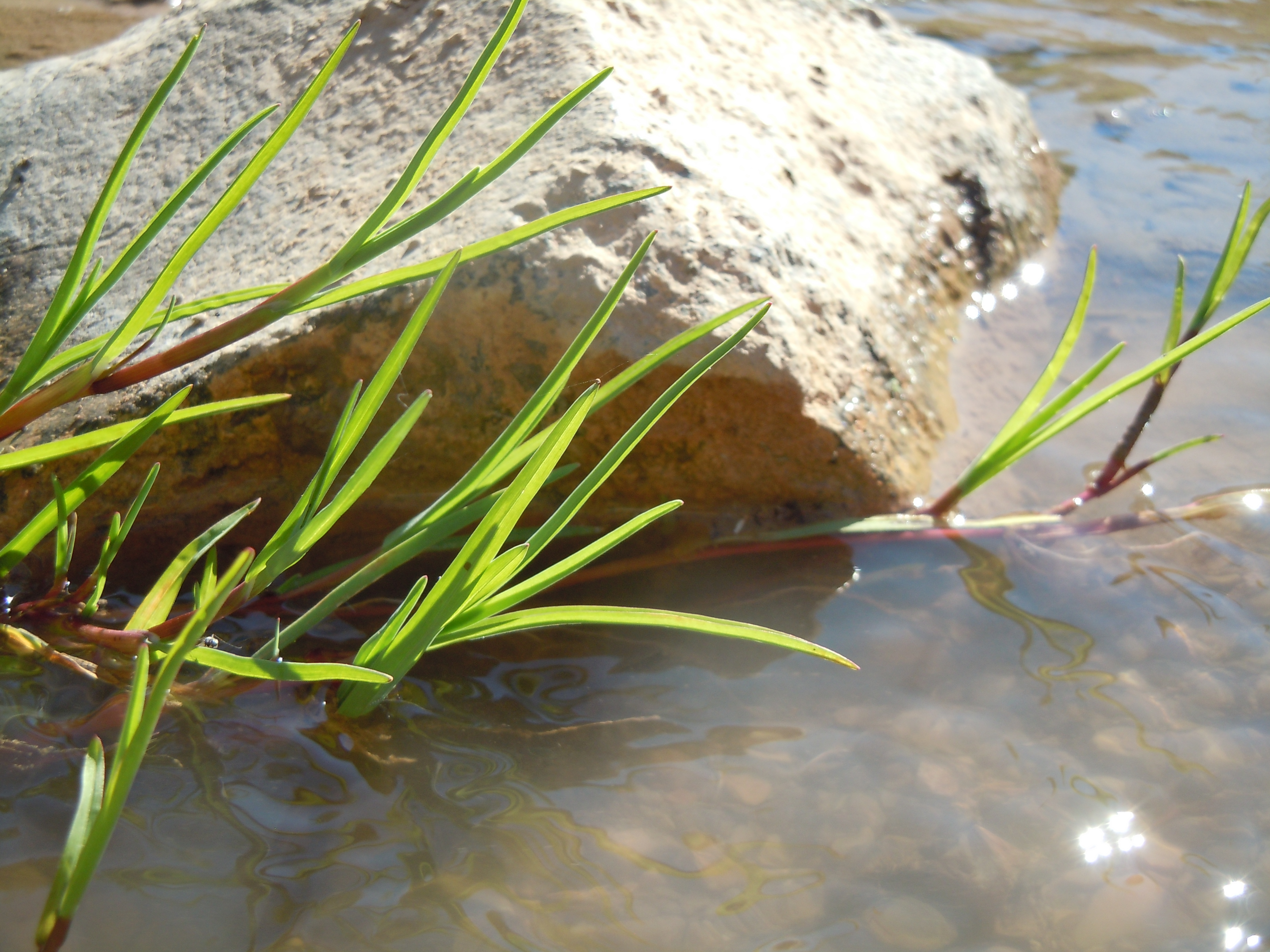

Conservation status
- Least Concern (IUCN 3.1)

Scientific classification
- Kingdom: Plantae
- Clade: Tracheophytes
- Clade: Angiosperms
- Clade: Monocots
- Clade: Commelinids
- Order: Poales
- Family: Poaceae
- Subfamily: Pooideae
- Genus: Catabrosa
- Species: C. aquatica

Binomial name
- Catabrosa aquatica Wall. ex Watt

Synonyms
- List: Agrostis tillieri Willd. ex Steud.; Aira aquatica L.; Aira scabra Zuccagni; Aira viridula Poir.; Catabrosa airoides Chevall.; Catabrosa angusta (Stapf) L.Liu; Catabrosa aquatica var. atrata Tzvelev; Catabrosa aquatica f. latifolia (Heuff.) Soó; Catabrosa aquatica var. laurentiana Fernald; Catabrosa aquatica var. minor Bab.; Catabrosa aquatica f. schurii Soó; Catabrosa aquatica var. uniflora Gray; Catabrosa aquatica f. uniflora (Gray) Holmb.; Catabrosa aquatica f. zapalowiczii Soó; Catabrosa atrata (Tzvelev) Tzvelev; Catabrosa capusii Franch.; Catabrosa elbursensis Bornm. & Gauba; Catabrosa kneuckeri Tzvelev; Catabrosa minor (Bab.) Tzvelev; Catabrosa ochroleuca Dumort.; Catabrosa pseudairoides (J.Herrm.) Tzvelev; Catabrosa scabra (Zuccagni) Kunth; Catabrosa sikkimensis Stapf; Catabrosa viridula (Poir.) Roem. & Schult.; Catapodium aquaticum Willk.; Colpodium aquaticum (L.) Trin.; Colpodium elbursense (Bornm. & Gauba) Parsa; Diarrhena aquatica (L.) Raspail; Glyceria airoides (Hartm.) Rchb.; Glyceria aquatica (L.) J.Presl & C.Presl; Glyceria dulcis (Salisb.) Holmb.; Glyceria ochroleuca (Dumort.) Guss.; Glyceria viridula (Poir.) Heynh.; Hydrochloa airoides Hartm.; Melica altissima Sobol.; Molinia aquatica (L.) Wibel; Poa airoides J.Herrm.; Poa airoides Koeler; Poa dulcis Salisb.; Poa grandiflora Clairv.; Poa pseudairoides J.Herrm.; Poa rivularis Bernh.; Poa sabauda All.

= Catabrosa aquatica =

Species of grass

Catabrosa aquatica, called brookgrass, water whorl-grass, water whirlgrass and water hairgrass, is a widespread species of semi-aquatic grass in the genus Catabrosa, native to most of the non-tropical northern hemisphere, and to southern Chile and Argentina. As its scientific and common names suggest, it prefers to grow in wet areas, such as meadows, stream banks and lake shores.
