= Aniselytron =

Scientific classification
- Kingdom: Plantae
- Clade: Tracheophytes
- Clade: Angiosperms
- Clade: Monocots
- Clade: Commelinids
- Order: Poales
- Family: Poaceae
- Subfamily: Pooideae
- Supertribe: Poodae
- Tribe: Poeae
- Subtribe: Cinninae
- Genus: Aniselytron; Merr.

Type species
- Aniselytron agrostoides Merr.

Synonyms
- Aulacolepis Hack.; Neoaulacolepis Rauschert

Genus of grasses

Aniselytron is a genus of Asian plants in the grass family.

Species

- Aniselytron agrostoides Merr. - Taiwan, Philippines
- Aniselytron treutleri (Kuntze) Soják - China (Fujian, Guangxi, Guizhou, Hubei, Sichuan, Taiwan, Yunnan), Bhutan, Sikkim, Darjeeling, Sumatra, Japan, Sabah, Myanmar, Vietnam

formerly included

see Calamagrostis Poa

- Aniselytron epileuca - Poa epileuca
- Aniselytron gracilis - Calamagrostis abnormis
- Aniselytron petelotii - Calamagrostis abnormis

== See also ==
- List of Poaceae genera
