= Zingeria =

Scientific classification
- Kingdom: Plantae
- Clade: Tracheophytes
- Clade: Angiosperms
- Clade: Monocots
- Clade: Commelinids
- Order: Poales
- Family: Poaceae
- Subfamily: Pooideae
- Supertribe: Poodae
- Tribe: Poeae
- Subtribe: Coleanthinae
- Genus: Zingeria; P.A.Smirn.

Type species
- Zingeria biebersteiniana (Claus) P.A.Smirn.

Synonyms
- Zingeriopsis Prob.

Genus of grasses

Zingeria is a genus of Asian and European plants in the grass family. Their native range covers the Black Sea and eastern Mediterranean regions from Romania to Kazakhstan.

Zingeria was named in honour of Vasily Jakovlevich Zinger (1836–1907), Russian mathematician, botanist and philosopher.

Species

- Zingeria biebersteiniana (Claus) P.A.Smirn. - Crimea, southern European Russia, northern and southern Caucasus, Turkey, Kazakhstan, Iran, Iraq, Syria, Jordan
- Zingeria kochii (Mez) Tzvelev - southern Caucasus
- Zingeria pisidica (Boiss.) Tutin - Romania, Turkey, southern Caucasus
- Zingeria trichopoda (Boiss.) P.A.Smirn. - southern Caucasus, Turkey, Iran, Iraq, Syria, Lebanon, possibly Saudi Arabia
- Zingeria verticillata (Boiss. & Bal.) Chrtek - Turkey
