= Limnodea =

Ozark grass

Scientific classification
- Kingdom: Plantae
- Clade: Tracheophytes
- Clade: Angiosperms
- Clade: Monocots
- Clade: Commelinids
- Order: Poales
- Family: Poaceae
- Subfamily: Pooideae
- Supertribe: Poodae
- Tribe: Poeae
- Subtribe: Agrostidinae
- Genus: Limnodea; L.H.Dewey
- Species: L. arkanasana

Binomial name
- Limnodea arkanasana (Nutt.) L.H.Dewey

Synonyms
- Greenia Nutt. 1837, illegitimate homonym not S. Wallman 1791; Sclerachne Torr. ex Trin. 1841, illegitimate homonym not R. Br. 1838; Thurberia Benth. 1881, illegitimate homonym not A. Gray 1854; Greenia arkansana Nutt.; Limnas arkansana (Nutt.) Trin. ex Steud.; Sclerachne arkansana (Nutt.) Torr. ex Trin.; Thurberia arkansana (Nutt.) Benth. ex Vasey; Cinna arkansana (Nutt.) G.C.Tucker; Sclerachne pilosa Trin.; Limnas pilosa (Trin.) Steud.; Muhlenbergia hirtula Steud.; Stipa demissa Steud.; Thurberia pilosa (Trin.) Vasey; Limnodea arkansana var. pilosa (Trin.) Scribn.

Genus of flowering plants

Limnodea, with the common name Ozark grass, is a genus of North American plants in the grass family. The type species is Greenia arkansana Nutt..

The only known species of the annual bunchgrass is Limnodea arkansana.

== Distribution ==
Limnodea arkansana is native to northeastern Mexico in Coahuila and Tamaulipas states; and to the South-Central/Midwestern and Southeastern United States, in Arkansas (including the Ozarks), Oklahoma, East Texas, Louisiana, Mississippi, Alabama, South Carolina, and the Florida Panhandle.

It grows in dry and usually sandy soils, in prairie, open woodland, and river bank habitats; and in disturbed areas. Along the Gulf Coast, it is found on upper beaches where shells accumulate, and on maritime shell mounds and middens.
