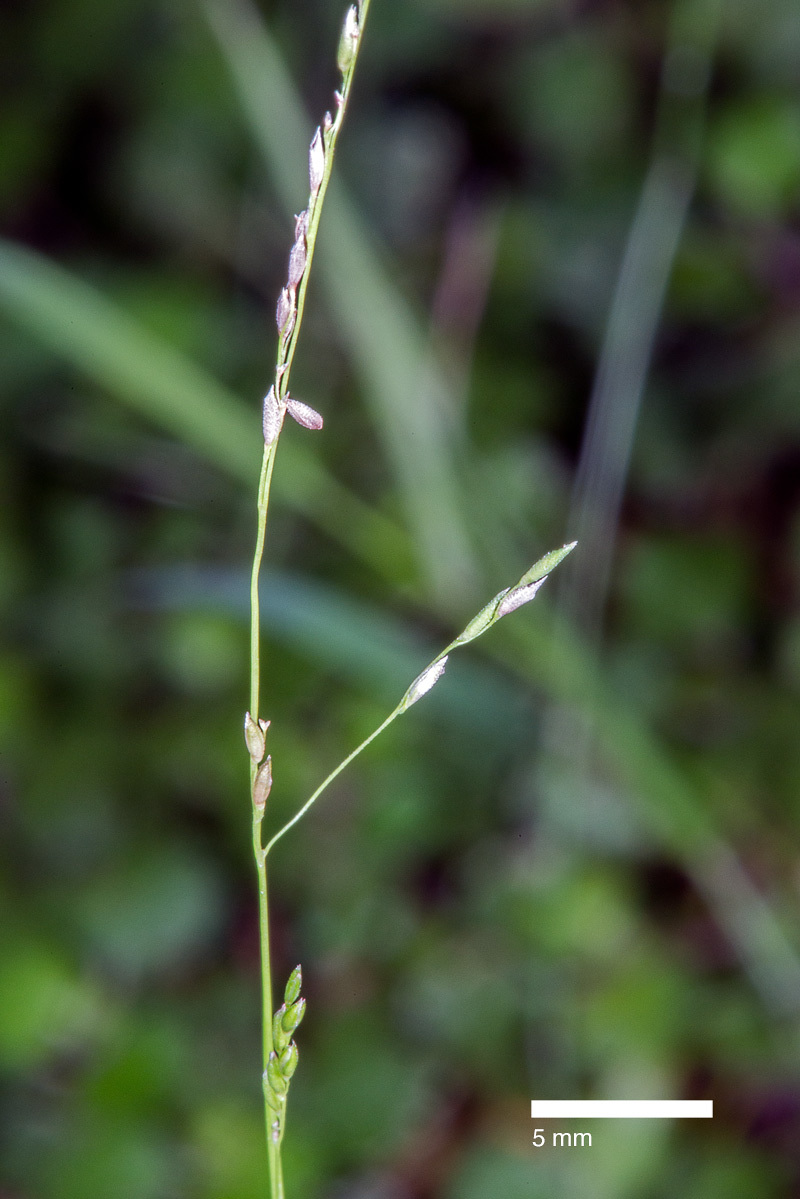
- Simplicia felix

Scientific classification
- Kingdom: Plantae
- Clade: Tracheophytes
- Clade: Angiosperms
- Clade: Monocots
- Clade: Commelinids
- Order: Poales
- Family: Poaceae
- Subfamily: Pooideae
- Supertribe: Poodae
- Tribe: Poeae
- Subtribe: Cinninae
- Genus: Simplicia; Kirk

Type species
- Simplicia laxa Kirk

= Simplicia (plant) =

Genus of grasses

Simplicia is a genus of plants in the grass family, native to New Zealand.

Species

- Simplicia buchananii (Zotov) Zotov - New Zealand (South Island)
- Simplicia felix de Lange, J.R.Rolfe, Smissen & Ogle - New Zealand (South Island and North Island)
- Simplicia laxa Kirk - New Zealand (South Island and North Island)
