= Hyalopoa =

Scientific classification
- Kingdom: Plantae
- Clade: Tracheophytes
- Clade: Angiosperms
- Clade: Monocots
- Clade: Commelinids
- Order: Poales
- Family: Poaceae
- Subfamily: Pooideae
- Supertribe: Poodae
- Tribe: Poeae
- Subtribe: Coleanthinae
- Genus: Hyalopoa (Tzvelev) Tzvelev

Synonyms
- Colpodium subgen. Hyalopoa Tzvelev

Genus of grasses

Hyalopoa is a genus of Asian plants in the grass family.

Species

- Hyalopoa czirahica Hüseyin - Caucasus
- Hyalopoa hracziana Gabrieljan & Tzvelev - Caucasus
- Hyalopoa lakia (Woronow) Tzvelev - Caucasus
- Hyalopoa lanatiflora (Roshev.) Tzvelev - Siberia (Yakutia, Buryatia, Zabaykalsk)
- Hyalopoa nutans (Stapf) E.B.Alexeev ex T.A.Cope - Pakistan, Jammu-Kashmir, Tajikistan
- Hyalopoa pontica (Balansa) Tzvelev - Turkey, Caucasus
