= Tricholemma =

Scientific classification
- Kingdom: Plantae
- Clade: Tracheophytes
- Clade: Angiosperms
- Clade: Monocots
- Clade: Commelinids
- Order: Poales
- Family: Poaceae
- Subfamily: Pooideae
- Supertribe: Poodae
- Tribe: Poeae
- Subtribe: Aveninae
- Genus: Tricholemma (Röser) Röser

Synonyms
- Helictotrichon subgen. Tricholemma Röser

Genus of grasses

Tricholemma is a genus of North African plants in the grass family.

Species

- Tricholemma breviaristatum (Barratte) Röser - Algeria
- Tricholemma jahandiezii (Litard. ex Jahand. & Maire) Röser - Algeria, Morocco

== See also ==
- List of Poaceae genera
