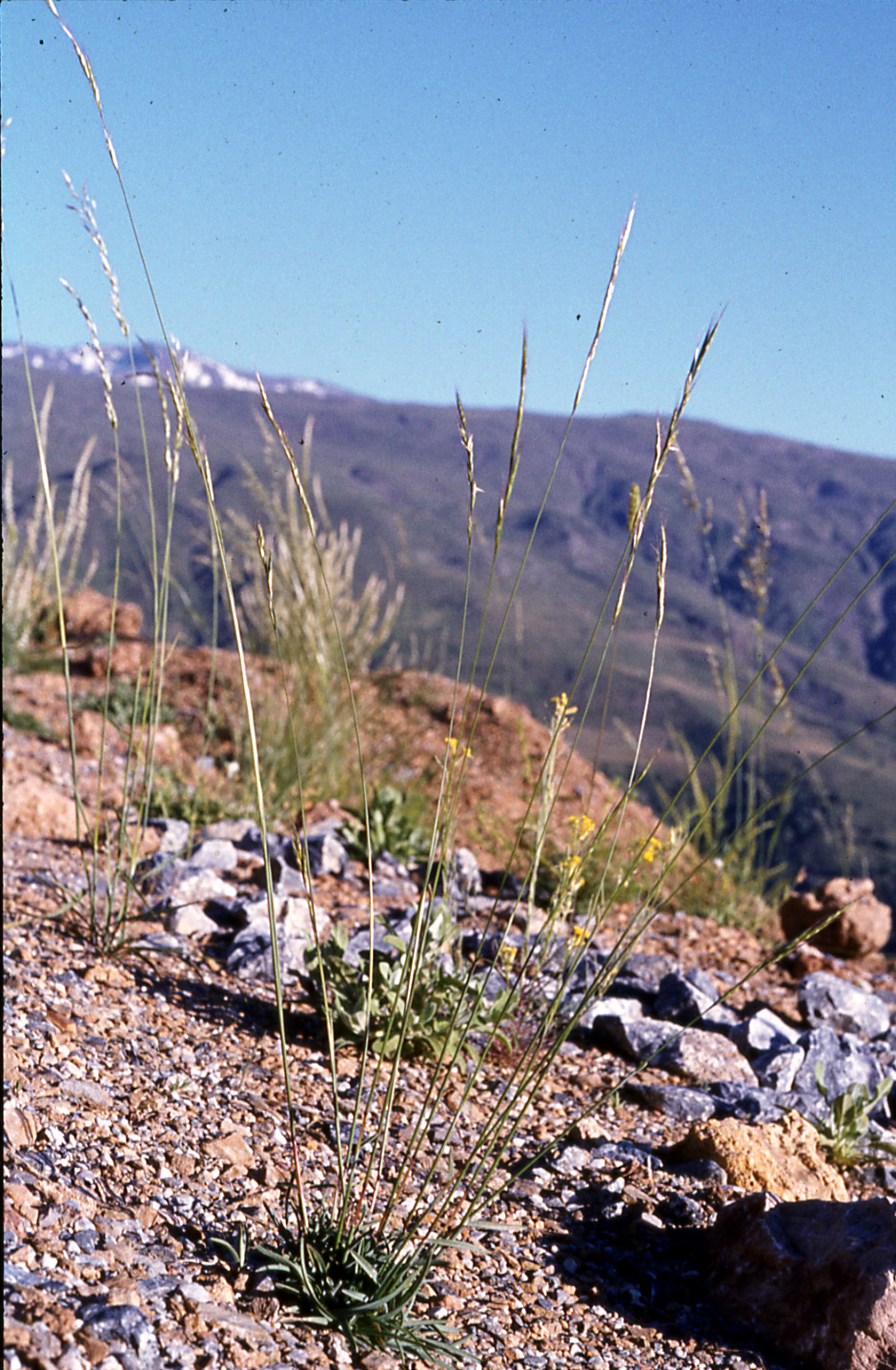
- Helictochloa levis

Scientific classification
- Kingdom: Plantae
- Clade: Tracheophytes
- Clade: Angiosperms
- Clade: Monocots
- Clade: Commelinids
- Order: Poales
- Family: Poaceae
- Subfamily: Pooideae
- Supertribe: Poodae
- Tribe: Poeae
- Subtribe: Airinae
- Genus: Helictochloa; Romero Zarco

= Helictochloa =

Genus of plants

Helictochloa is a genus of Eurasian, North African, and North American plants in the grass family.

Species

- Helictochloa aetolica - Greece
- Helictochloa agropyroides - Greece
- Helictochloa albinervis - Morocco, Spain, Portugal
- Helictochloa armeniaca - Turkey, Caucasus
- Helictochloa blaui - Balkans
- Helictochloa bromoides - western + central Mediterranean
- Helictochloa cincinnata - Italy, Algeria, Tunisia, Libya
- Helictochloa compressa - Balkans, Hungary, Crimea
- Helictochloa crassifolia - Balearic Islands
- Helictochloa dahurica - Mongolia, northern China, Asiatic Russia
- Helictochloa gervaisii - Morocco, Spain, Algeria
- Helictochloa hackelii - Portugal
- Helictochloa hookeri - widespread in much of Russia and China; also Ukraine, Mongolia, Central Asia, Canada, parts of USA (mostly Rocky Mountains)
- Helictochloa levis - Morocco, Spain
- Helictochloa lusitanica - Portugal
- Helictochloa marginata - Spain, France, Portugal, Morocco, Canary Islands, Madeira
- Helictochloa murcica - Spain, Portugal
- Helictochloa planiculmis - Poland, Czech Republic, Ukraine, Balkans, Turkey
- Helictochloa praeusta - Italy, Balkans, Hungary, Austria, Czech Republic, Ukraine
- Helictochloa pratensis - Europe, Middle East
- Helictochloa pruinosa - Spain, Algeria
- Helictochloa × talaverae - Spain
- Helictochloa versicolor - central + southern Europe, Turkey, Caucasus

== See also ==
- List of Poaceae genera
