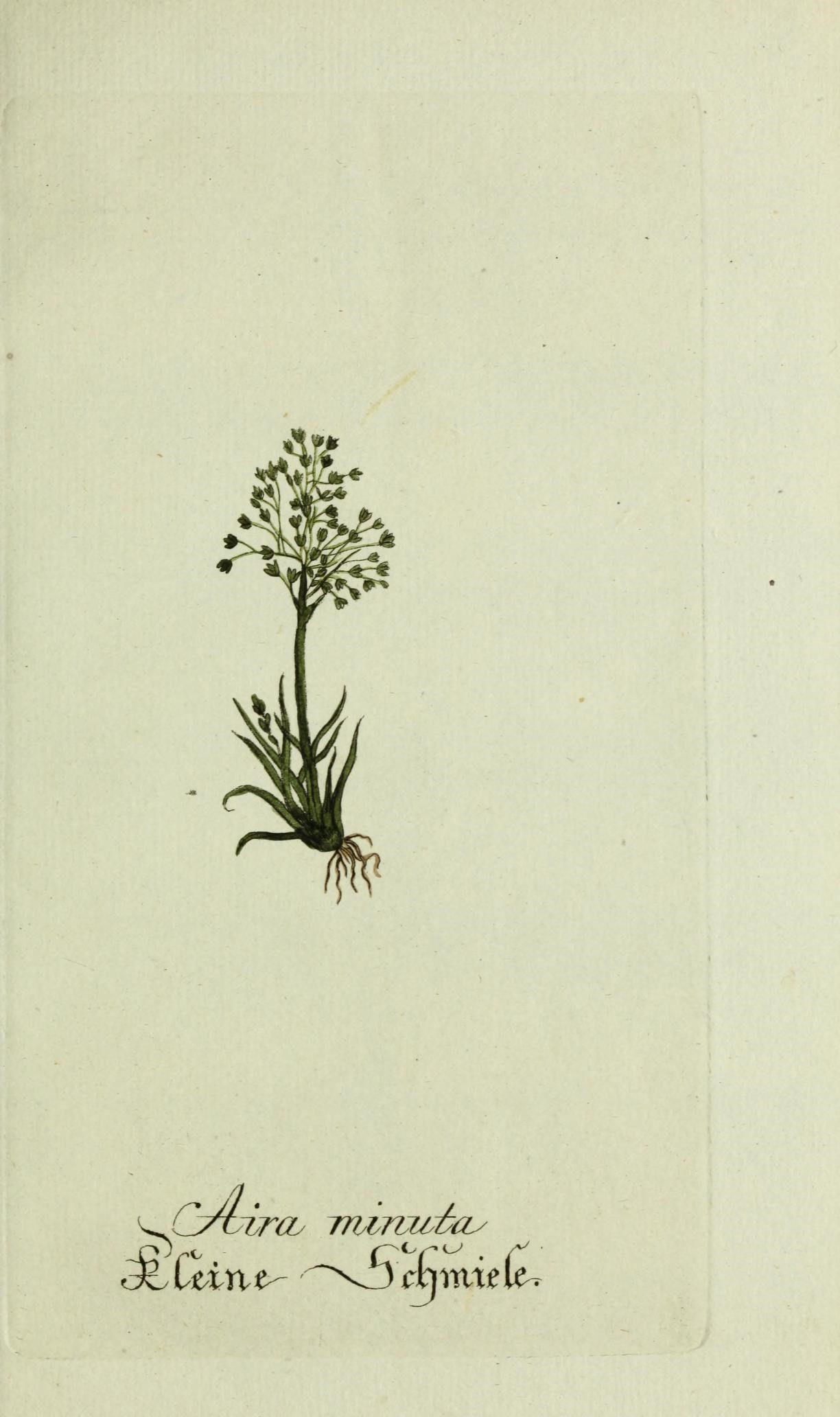
- Periballia minuta

Scientific classification
- Kingdom: Plantae
- Clade: Tracheophytes
- Clade: Angiosperms
- Clade: Monocots
- Clade: Commelinids
- Order: Poales
- Family: Poaceae
- Subfamily: Pooideae
- Supertribe: Poodae
- Tribe: Poeae
- Subtribe: Airinae
- Genus: Periballia; Trin.

Type species
- Periballia hispanica (syn of P. involucrata) Trin.

Synonyms
- Molineria Parl. 1850, illegitimate homonym not Colla 1826 (Hypoxidaceae); Molineriella Rouy

= Periballia =

Genus of grasses

Periballia is a genus of Mediterranean plants in the grass family.

Species

- Periballia involucrata (Cav.) Janka - Spain, Portugal
- Periballia laevis (Brot.) Asch. & Graebn. - Spain, Portugal, Morocco, Crimea; naturalized in parts of United States
- Periballia minuta (L.) Asch. & Graebn. - Spain, Portugal, France incl Corsica, Italy incl Sicily + Sardinia, Greece, Bulgaria, Albania, Croatia, European Turkey, Algeria, Morocco; naturalized in South Africa + Australia
