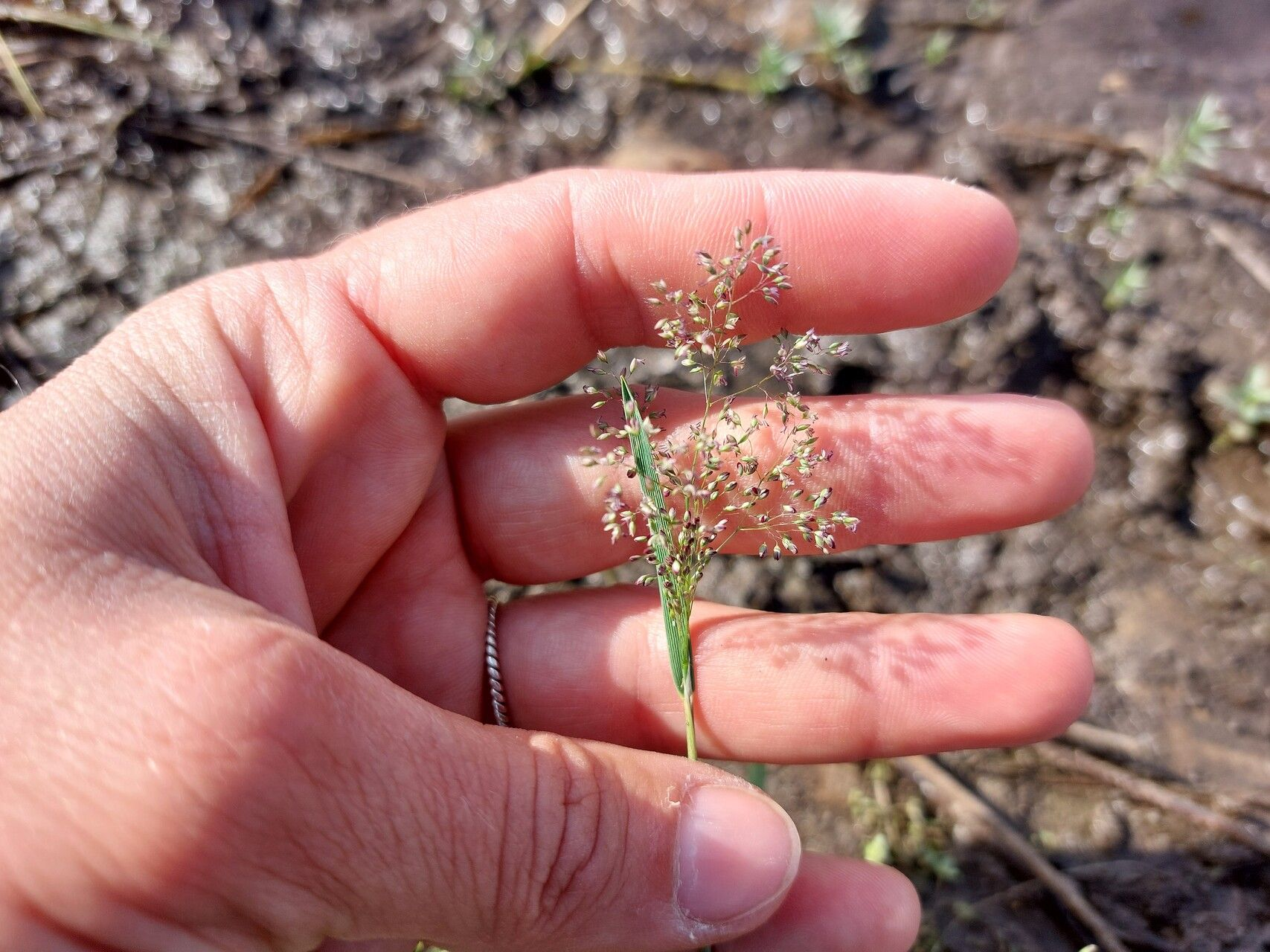

Scientific classification
- Kingdom: Plantae
- Clade: Tracheophytes
- Clade: Angiosperms
- Clade: Monocots
- Clade: Commelinids
- Order: Poales
- Family: Poaceae
- Subfamily: Pooideae
- Supertribe: Poodae
- Tribe: Poeae
- Subtribe: Airinae
- Genus: Antinoria; Parl.

Type species
- Antinoria agrostidea (DC.) Parl.

= Antinoria =

Genus of grasses

Antinoria is a genus of Mediterranean plants in the grass family.

Species

- Antinoria agrostidea (DC.) Parl. - Spain, Portugal, France, Italy, Morocco, Algeria, Libya, Tunisia
- Antinoria insularis Parl. - Spain, Portugal, France, Italy, North Africa, Crete, Turkey, Israel

== See also ==
- List of Poaceae genera
