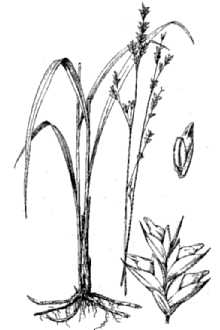
- Diarrhena americana

Scientific classification
- Kingdom: Plantae
- Clade: Tracheophytes
- Clade: Angiosperms
- Clade: Monocots
- Clade: Commelinids
- Order: Poales
- Family: Poaceae
- Subfamily: Pooideae
- Tribe: Diarrheneae
- Genus: Diarrhena; P.Beauv.

Type species
- Diarrhena americana P.Beauv.

Synonyms
- Diarina Raf.; Korycarpus Zea ex Lag.; Corycarpus Zea ex Spreng., alternate spelling; Roemeria Roem. & Schult. 1817, illegitimate homonym not Medik. 1792 (Papaveraceae) nor Raddi 1818 (liverwort in Aneuraceae) nor Moench 1794 (Amaranthaceae) nor Thunb. 1798 (Sapotaceae) nor DC. 1821 (Capparaceae); Neomolinia Honda & Sakisaka

= Diarrhena =

Genus of grasses

Diarrhena, or beakgrain, is a genus of Asian and North American plants in the grass family.

Species

- Diarrhena americana P. Beauv. - east-central United States (OK MO AR IL IN OH KY TN AL GA NC VA WV MD PA)
- Diarrhena fauriei (Hack.) Ohwi - Shandong, Jilin, Heilongjiang, Liaoning, Japan, Korea, Primorye
- Diarrhena japonica Franch. & Sav. - Japan, Jeju-do, Kuril, Jilin, Heilongjiang, Liaoning
- Diarrhena mandshurica Maxim. - Jilin, Heilongjiang, Liaoning, Primorye, Amur, Khabarovsk, Korea, Hebei, Shanxi
- Diarrhena obovata (Gleason) Brandenburg - Ontario, east-central United States (TX OK KS NE SD MN IA MO AR IL WI MI IN OH KY TN VA WV PA NY)

formerly included

see Ammophila Catabrosa Cutandia Sphenopus Vulpia

- Diarrhena aquatica - Catabrosa aquatica
- Diarrhena divaricata - Sphenopus divaricatus
- Diarrhena festucoides Raspail 1825 not (Raf.) Fernald 1932 - Cutandia divaricata
- Diarrhena littoralis - Ammophila arenaria subsp. australis
- Diarrhena maritima - Cutandia maritima
- Diarrhena setacea - Vulpia octoflora
