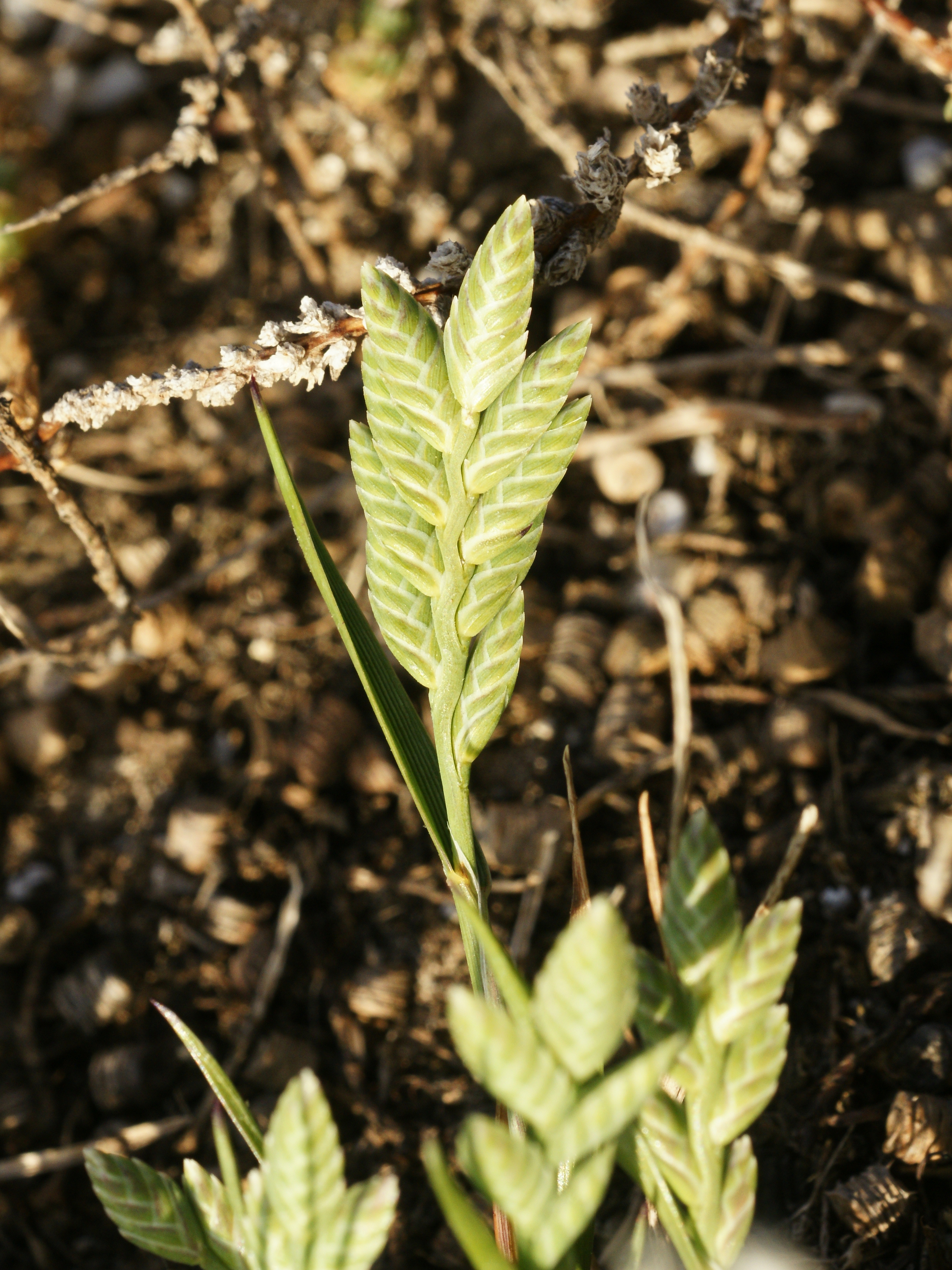
- Desmazeria sicula

Scientific classification
- Kingdom: Plantae
- Clade: Tracheophytes
- Clade: Angiosperms
- Clade: Monocots
- Clade: Commelinids
- Order: Poales
- Family: Poaceae
- Subfamily: Pooideae
- Supertribe: Poodae
- Tribe: Poeae
- Subtribe: Parapholiinae
- Genus: Desmazeria; Dumort.

Type species
- Desmazeria sicula (Jacq.) Dumort.

Synonyms
- Demazeria Dumort., alternate spelling; Brizopyrum Link

= Desmazeria =

Genus of grasses

Desmazeria is a genus of Mediterranean plants in the grass family, related to Catapodium.

The genus is named for John Baptiste Henri Joseph Desmazières, (1796-1862) a French merchant, amateur botanist, and editor of scientific journals.

Species

- Desmazeria lorentii H.Scholz - Tunisia, Libya
- Desmazeria philistaea (Boiss.) H.Scholz - Tunisia, Libya, Egypt, Palestine, Israel, Jordan, Lebanon, Syria
- Desmazeria pignattii Brullo & Pavone - Sicily
- Desmazeria sicula (Jacq.) Dumort. - Sicily, Sardinia, Calabria, Spain, Algeria, Libya, Tunisia

formerly included

see Castellia Catapodium Cutandia Halopyrum Sclerochloa Tribolium Wangenheimia

- Desmazeria acutiflora - Tribolium acutiflorum
- Desmazeria alternans - Tribolium alternans
- Desmazeria balearica - Catapodium marinum
- Desmazeria capensis - Tribolium uniolae
- Desmazeria castellana - Wangenheimia lima
- Desmazeria composita - Tribolium obtusifolium
- Desmazeria compressa - Sclerochloa woronowii
- Desmazeria loliacea - Catapodium marinum
- Desmazeria marina - Catapodium marinum
- Desmazeria marina subsp. pauciflora - Wangenheimia lima
- Desmazeria oblitera - Tribolium obliterum
- Desmazeria pauciflora - Wangenheimia lima
- Desmazeria rigescens - Cutandia rigescens
- Desmazeria rigida - Catapodium rigidum
- Desmazeria triticea - Catapodium marinum
- Desmazeria tuberculosa (Moris) Bonnier 1896 not Trab. 1884 - Castellia tuberculosa
- Desmazeria uniolae - Tribolium uniolae
- Desmazeria unioloides - Halopyrum mucronatum
- Desmazeria woronowii - Sclerochloa woronowii
