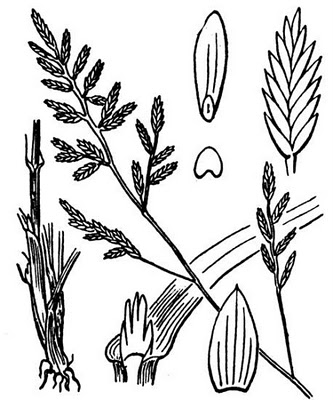
- Catapodium rigidum

Scientific classification
- Kingdom: Plantae
- Clade: Tracheophytes
- Clade: Angiosperms
- Clade: Monocots
- Clade: Commelinids
- Order: Poales
- Family: Poaceae
- Subfamily: Pooideae
- Supertribe: Poodae
- Tribe: Poeae
- Subtribe: Parapholiinae
- Genus: Catapodium; Link, 1827

Type species
- Catapodium loliaceum (Huds.) Link

Synonyms
- Catopodium Link, alternate spelling; Scleropoa Griseb.; Synaphe Dulac; Brachypodium sect. Catapodium (Link) Bluff, Nees & Schauer; Desmazeria sect. Catapodium (Link) Bonnet & Barratte; Festuca sect. Catapodium (Link) Endl.; Poa sect. Catapodium (Link) W.D.J. Koch

= Catapodium =

Genus of grasses

Catapodium is a genus of Eurasian and North African plants in the grass family.

== Species list ==
The genus comprises the following species:

- Catapodium demnatense (Murb.) Maire & Weiller - Morocco
- Catapodium mamoraeum (Maire) Maire & Weiller - Morocco
- Catapodium marinum (L.) C.E.Hubb. - Eurasia + North Africa from Ireland + Canary Islands to Turkey
- Catapodium rigidum (L.) C.E.Hubb. - Eurasia + North Africa from Ireland + Canary Islands to Crimea + Iran + Arabian Peninsula

=== Taxa formerly included ===
See Aeluropus Agropyropsis Castellia Catabrosa Cutandia Desmazeria Eragrostiella Festuca Micropyrum Tripogon Vulpia Wangenheimia:

- Catapodium aquaticum - Catabrosa aquatica
- Catapodium bifarium - Eragrostiella bifaria
- Catapodium coromandelianum - Eragrostiella bifaria
- Catapodium filiforme - Tripogon filiformis
- Catapodium fusiforme - Tripogon bromoides
- Catapodium halleri - Micropyrum tenellum
- Catapodium lolium - Agropyropsis lolium
- Catapodium montanum - Vulpia unilateralis
- Catapodium nepalense - Eragrostiella nardoides
- Catapodium patens - Micropyrum patens
- Catapodium pauciflorum - Wangenheimia lima
- Catapodium pungens - Aeluropus macrostachyus
- Catapodium rigescens - Cutandia rigescens
- Catapodium salzmannii - Festuca salzmannii
- Catapodium siculum - Desmazeria sicula
- Catapodium tenellum - Micropyrum tenellum
- Catapodium tuberculosum - Castellia tuberculosa
- Catapodium unilaterale - Vulpia unilateralis

== See also ==
- List of Poaceae genera
