= Squirreltail fescue =

Squirreltail fescue is a common name for several grasses and may refer to:

- Vulpia bromoides, native to Europe and Africa and naturalized in western North America
- Vulpia elliotea, native to eastern North America
