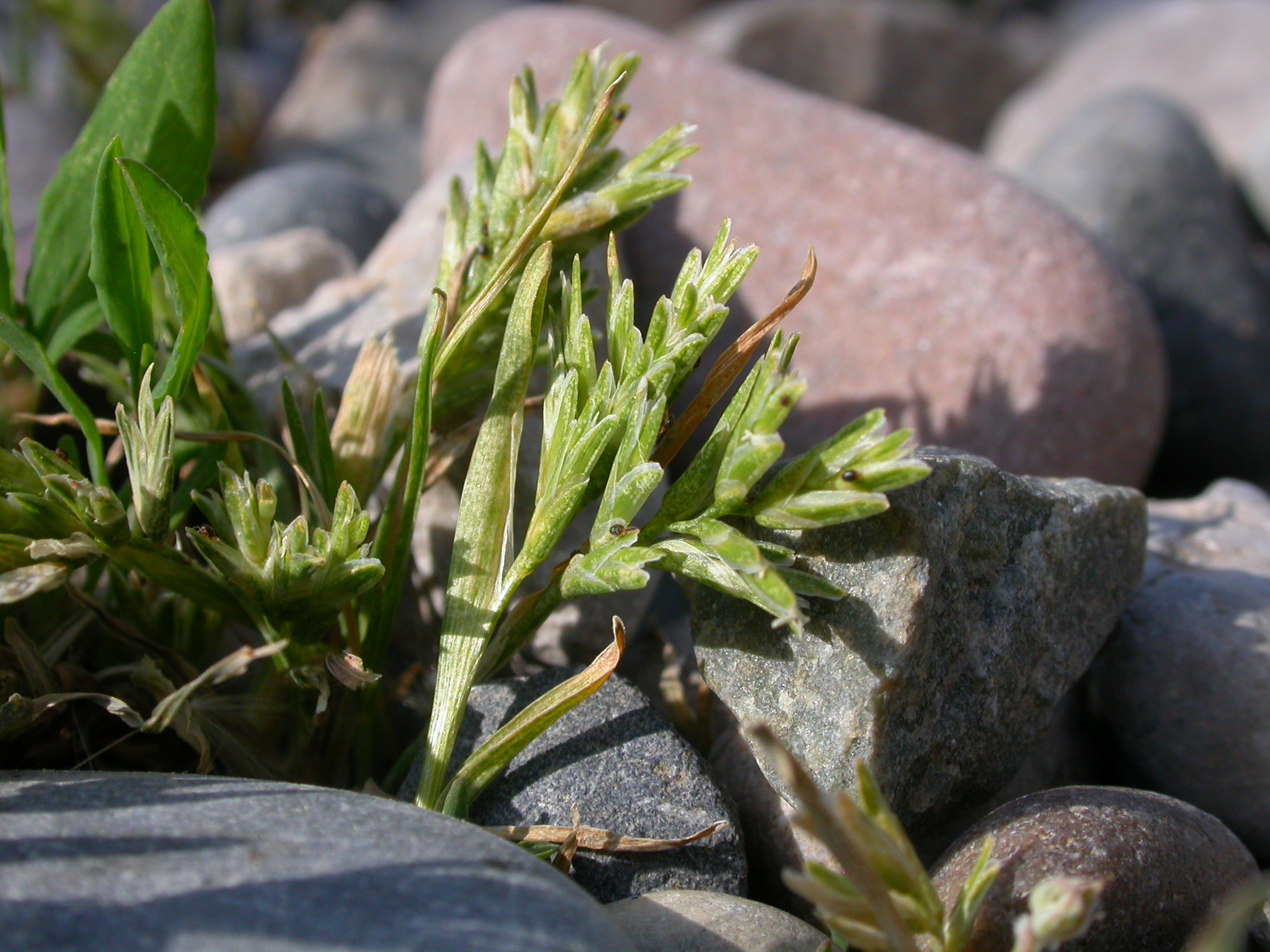
- Sclerochloa dura

Scientific classification
- Kingdom: Plantae
- Clade: Embryophytes
- Clade: Tracheophytes
- Clade: Angiosperms
- Clade: Monocots
- Clade: Commelinids
- Order: Poales
- Family: Poaceae
- Subfamily: Pooideae
- Supertribe: Poodae
- Tribe: Poeae
- Subtribe: Coleanthinae
- Genus: Sclerochloa; P.Beauv.

Type species
- Sclerochloa dura (L.) P.Beauv.

Synonyms
- Crassipes Swallen

= Sclerochloa =

Genus of grasses

Sclerochloa is a genus of Eurasian and North African plants in the grass family. Hardgrass is a common name for plants in this genus.

== Species ==
- Sclerochloa dura (L.) P.Beauv. - Europe, Asia, and North Africa from Spain + Morocco to Pakistan + Xinjiang; naturalized in Australia + North America
- Sclerochloa woronowii (Hack.) Tzvelev - Tajikistan, Afghanistan, Iraq, Syria, Caucasus, Turkey

== Formerly included ==
numerous species now considered better suited to other genera: Catapodium Cutandia Desmazeria Festuca Poa Puccinellia Sphenopus
