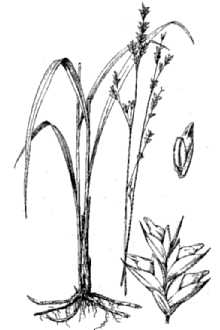
- Diarrhena americana

Scientific classification
- Kingdom: Plantae
- Clade: Tracheophytes
- Clade: Angiosperms
- Clade: Monocots
- Clade: Commelinids
- Order: Poales
- Family: Poaceae
- Clade: BOP clade
- Subfamily: Pooideae
- Tribe: Diarrheneae; C.S. Campb. (1985)

Genera
- Diarrhena; Neomolinia

Synonyms
- subtribe Diarrheninae Ohwi (1941)

= Diarrheneae =

Tribe of grasses

Diarrheneae is a tribe of grasses, containing two genera.
