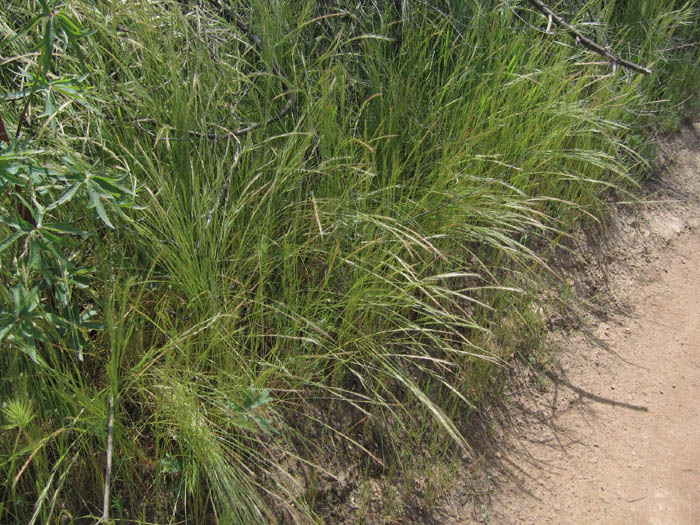

Scientific classification
- Kingdom: Plantae
- Clade: Embryophytes
- Clade: Tracheophytes
- Clade: Angiosperms
- Clade: Monocots
- Clade: Commelinids
- Order: Poales
- Family: Poaceae
- Genus: Vulpia
- Species: V. myuros

Binomial name
- Vulpia myuros (L.) C.C. Gmel.

= Vulpia myuros =

Species of grass

Vulpia myuros, the annual fescue, or rat's-tail fescue, is an annual flowering plant in grass family Poaceae. It was probably originally native to Eurasia, but it can now be found nearly worldwide as a naturalized species.

In the United Kingdom it forms dense, even swards of fine, hair-like stems in recently disturbed habitats. It is often eventually displaced by perennial grasses.

== Invasive species ==
Vulpia myuros is considered a noxious weed and invasive species in places where it is not native, especially in areas with a Mediterranean climate. For example, it is widespread in California, where it is now a dominant species in many types of grassy habitat.
