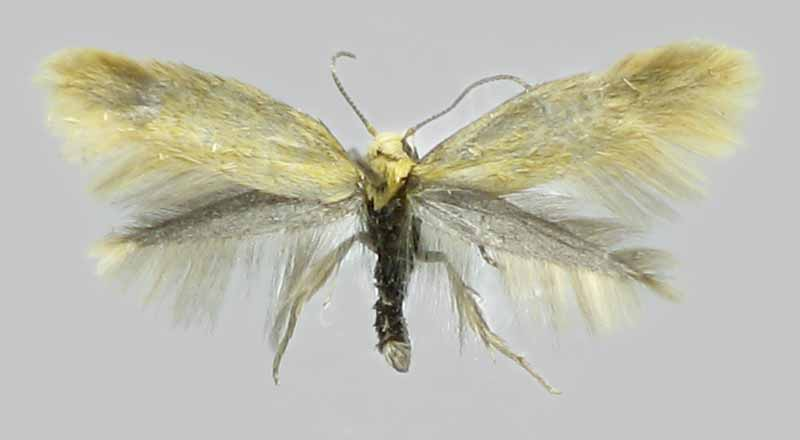

Scientific classification
- Kingdom: Animalia
- Phylum: Arthropoda
- Clade: Pancrustacea
- Class: Insecta
- Order: Lepidoptera
- Family: Elachistidae
- Genus: Elachista
- Species: E. subalbidella

Binomial name
- Elachista subalbidella Schläger, 1847

Synonyms
- Elachista hiberna Braun, 1948

= Elachista subalbidella =

Species of moth

Elachista subalbidella is a moth of the family Elachistidae found in Europe and North America.

== Description ==
The wingspan is 10–13 millimetres (0.39–0.51 in).The head is ochreous-yellowish. Forewings are ochreous yellow, towards costa sometimes fuscous-tinged. Hindwings are dark grey.

== Biology ==
Adults are on wing in June.

The larvae mainly feed on purple moor-grass (Molinia caerulea), but have also been recorded on oatgrass (Arrhenatherum species), tor-grass (Brachypodium pinnatum), false-brome (Brachypodium sylvaticum), bunch grass (Calamagrostis arundinacea), American beak grass (Diarrhena americana), sedges (Carex species), melic grass (Melica species) and meadow-grass (Poa species).

== Distribution ==
It is found from Fennoscandia and northern Russia to Italy and Greece and from Ireland to Romania. It is also found in North America (British Columbia, Manitoba, Nova Scotia, Ontario, Quebec, Yukon, Ohio, Pennsylvania and South Dakota).
