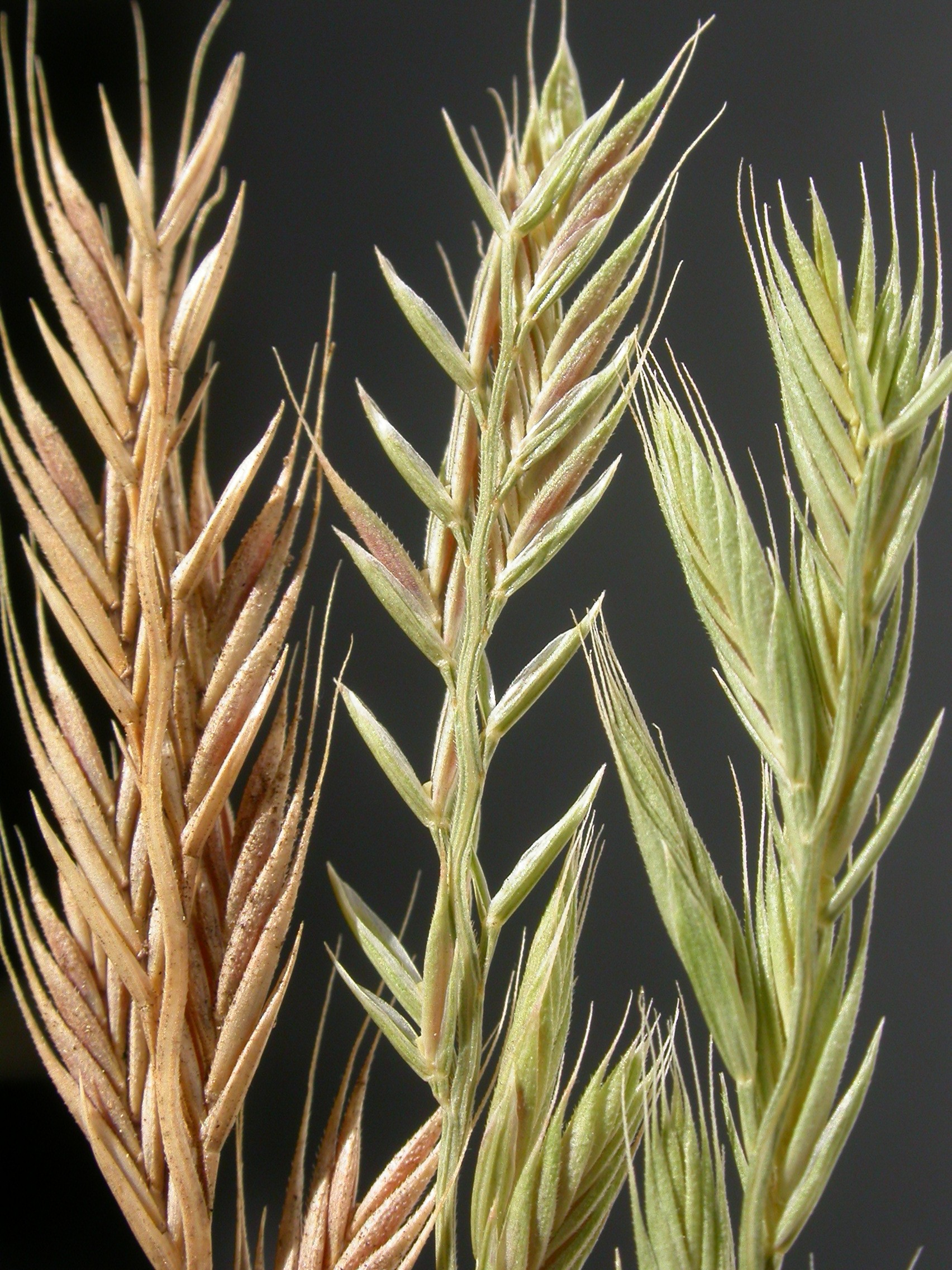
- Vulpia octoflora

Scientific classification
- Kingdom: Plantae
- Clade: Tracheophytes
- Clade: Angiosperms
- Clade: Monocots
- Clade: Commelinids
- Order: Poales
- Family: Poaceae
- Genus: Vulpia; C.C.Gmel.

Type species
- Vulpia myuros (L.) C.C.Gmel.

Synonyms
- Festuca sect. Vulpia (C.C. Gmel.) Endl.; Festuca subgen. Vulpia (C.C. Gmel.) Hack.; Zerna Panz.; Mygalurus Link; Chloamnia Raf.; Dasiola Raf.; Nardurus (Bluff, Nees & Schauer) Rchb.; Festucaria Link 1844, illegitimate homonym not Heist. ex Fabr. 1759; Ctenopsis De Not.; Distomischus Dulac; Prosphysis Dulac; Loretia Duval-Jouve; [Narduretia Villar

= Vulpia =

Genus of grasses

Vulpia is a widespread genus of plants in the grass family, native to many countries around the world and naturalized in many of the nations to which it is not native. It is most common in temperate regions.

Vulpia is a part of a group of species known as fescues; Vulpia is sometimes considered a subset of the main fescue genus, Festuca. Many of these fescues are considered noxious weeds in many places. Vulpia myuros is a notable weed.

The genus is named for Johann Samuel Vulpius (1760-1846), a German botanist.

Species

- Vulpia alopecuros (Schousb.) Link - western Mediterranean, Canary Is
- Vulpia alpina L.Liu - Tibet
- Vulpia antucensis Trin. - Chile, Argentina
- Vulpia australis (Nees) Blom - South America
- Vulpia brevis Boiss. & Kotschy - eastern Mediterranean
- Vulpia bromoides (L.) Gray - brome fescue - Europe, Africa, Arabia; naturalized in Australia, the Americas, various islands
- Vulpia ciliata Dumort. - Europe, North Africa, central + southwestern Asia; introduced in Australia, New Zealand, Pennsylvania
- Vulpia cynosuroides (Desf.) Parl. - Algeria, Morocco, Tunisia
- Vulpia delicatula (Lag.) Dumort. - Portugal, Spain
- Vulpia elliotea (Raf.) Fernald - squirreltail fescue - southeastern USA (Texas to New Jersey)
- Vulpia fasciculata (Forssk.) Samp. - western Europe, Mediterranean, Caucasus; introduced in Australia, South Africa
- Vulpia fontquerana Melderis & Stace - Spain
- Vulpia geniculata (L.) Link - Mediterranean, Sweden, Britain, Canary Islands, Madeira
- Vulpia gracilis H.Scholz - Tunisia, Libya
- Vulpia gypsophila (Hack.) Nyman - Spain, Sicily
- Vulpia ligustica (All.) Link - Mediterranean
- Vulpia litardiereana (Maire) A.Camus - Morocco
- Vulpia membranacea (L.) Dumort. - Mediterranean
- Vulpia microstachys (Nutt.) Munro - small fescue - western USA, British Columbia, Baja California (incl Guadalupe Island), Peru
- Vulpia muralis (Kunth) Nees - Mediterranean, Azores, Canary Islands, Balkans, Hungary, Saudi Arabia; introduced in Australia, scattered locales in South America
- Vulpia myuros (L.) C.C.Gmel. - rat-tail fescue - Africa, Eurasia; introduced in Australia, the Americas, various islands
- Vulpia octoflora (Walter) Rydb. - widespread in North America; also Chile + Argentina
- Vulpia pectinella (Delile) Boiss. - North Africa, Middle East from Morocco to Iraq
- Vulpia persica (Boiss. & Buhse) Krecz. & Bobrov - Asia from Saudi Arabia to Kazakhstan
- Vulpia sicula (J.Presl) Link - Mediterranean
- Vulpia unilateralis (L.) Stace - from Britain to Morocco + Tajikistan

formerly included

Numerous species once considered part of Vulpia but now regarded as better suited to other genera: Anthosachne Australopyrum Avellinia Festuca Micropyrum Vulpiella
