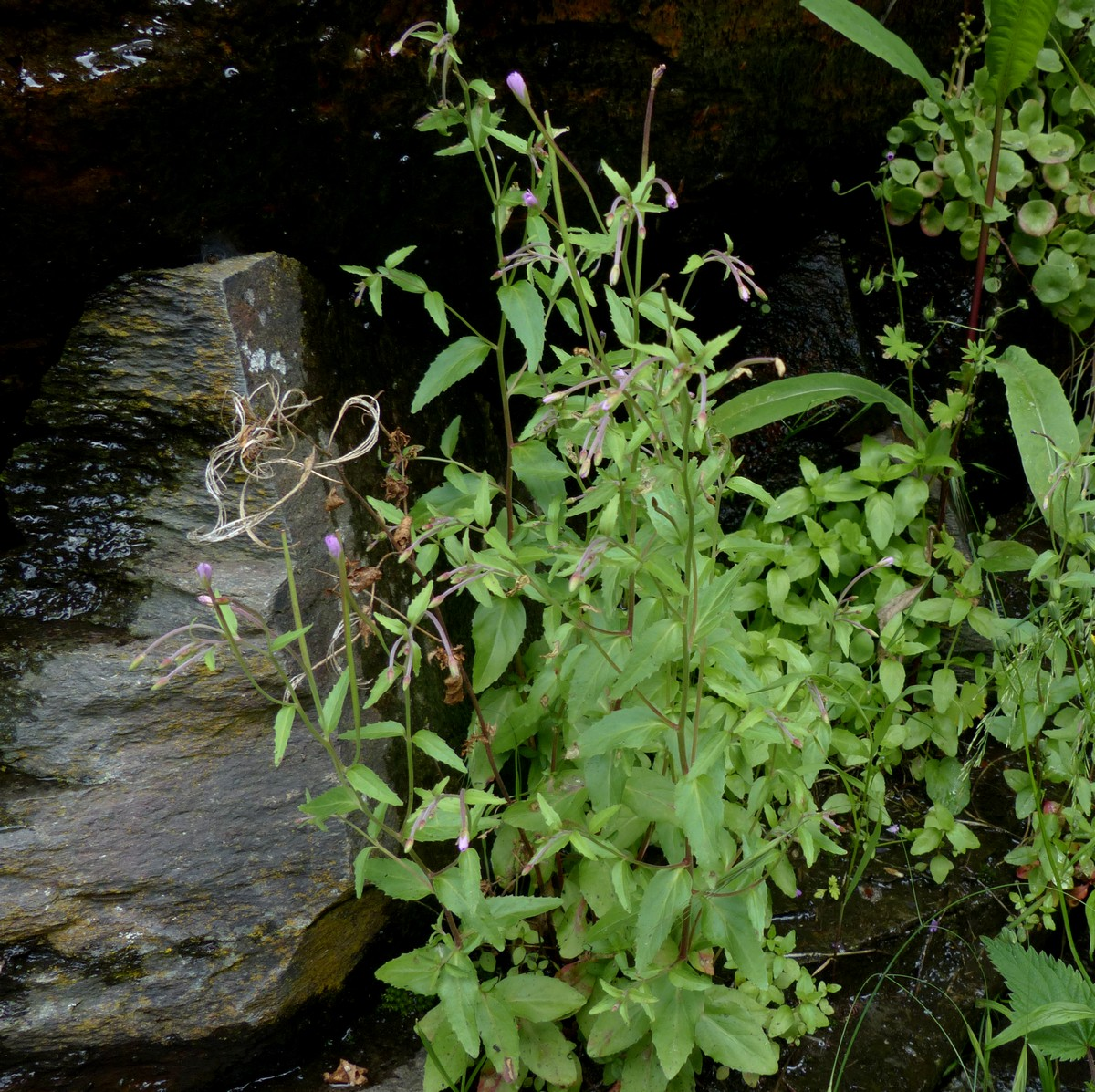

Scientific classification
- Kingdom: Plantae
- Clade: Tracheophytes
- Clade: Angiosperms
- Clade: Eudicots
- Clade: Rosids
- Order: Myrtales
- Family: Onagraceae
- Genus: Epilobium
- Species: E. collinum

Binomial name
- Epilobium collinum C.C.Gmel.

= Epilobium collinum =

Species of flowering plant

Epilobium collinum is a species of flowering plant belonging to the family Onagraceae.

== Description ==
Easily confused with Epilobium montanum and the very rare E. lanceolatum, it can be differentiated from these two by the absence of erect glandular trichomes on its calyx and fruit, present on E. montanum and E. lanceolatum.

== Distribution and habitat ==
It is a rare species. Its native range is Europe to Western Siberia. Within Croatia, it is present only in the western part, in the Mountain and West Pannonian macroregions (and possibly East Pannonian).

It occurs on silicate substrates, including in wet places.

== Bibliography ==
- Strgulc Krajšek, Sumona; Šegedin, Tamara; Jogan, Nejc (2009-06-30). "Revision of Epilobium and Chamerion in the Croatian herbaria ZA and ZAHO". Natura Croatica. 18 (1): 155–167. eISSN 1848-7386.
