= Crassipes =

Crassipes (Latin for "thickfoot") may refer to:

- Various Romans of the gens Furia who bore the cognomen Crassipes
- Sclerochloa, a genus of grasses formerly known as Crassipes
