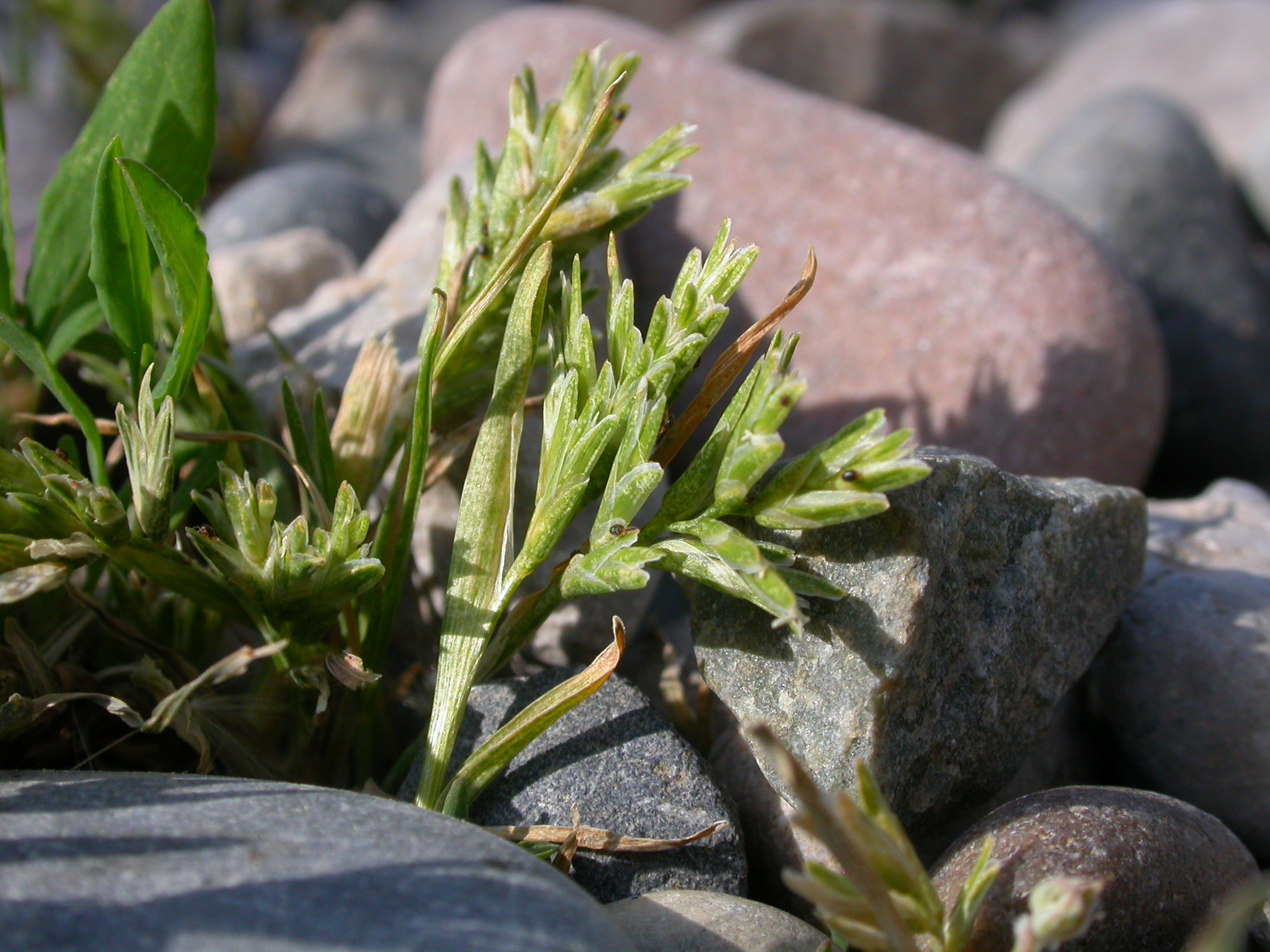

Scientific classification
- Kingdom: Plantae
- Clade: Tracheophytes
- Clade: Angiosperms
- Clade: Monocots
- Clade: Commelinids
- Order: Poales
- Family: Poaceae
- Subfamily: Pooideae
- Genus: Sclerochloa
- Species: S. dura

Binomial name
- Sclerochloa dura (L.) P.Beauv.

Synonyms
- Homotypic synonyms: Cynosurus durus L.; Eleusine dura (L.) Lam.; Festuca dura (L.) Vill.; Poa dura (L.) Scop.; Sesleria dura (L.) Kunth; Heterotypic synonyms: Amblychloa dura Link ex Hook.f.; Crassipes annuus Swallen; Sclerochloa dura var. arenosa Schur

= Sclerochloa dura =

Species of grass

Sclerochloa dura, also known as common hardgrass, is a species of grass in the family Poaceae. It is native to Africa, Europe, and Asia, and introduced in North America, South America, and Australia. In parts of North America, it is known as fairgrounds grass since it is often found on fairgrounds in Ohio, Michigan, Indiana, Illinois and elsewhere in the Great Lakes region.

== Description ==
Sclerochloa dura is a sturdy annual grass forming low, flat clumps of short stems, some prostrate and some upright. The flat, overlapping leaf blades are a few centimeters long. The inflorescence is a crowded, one-sided series of flattened spikelets, each with (2–)3–4(–7) florets. At the base of the inflorescence, each glume has 3–7 prominent veins. The lemmas at the base of each floret are glabrous with rounded tips.

Sclerochloa dura is sometimes confused with Poa annua, especially in a vegetative state. The two species are more easily distinguished based on floral characteristics.

	Sclerochloa dura	Poa annua
Inflorescence	Congested raceme, distinctly one-sided	Openly branched panicle, more-or-less symmetric
Spikelets	Sessile (or nearly so)	Pedunculate
Glumes	Strongly 3–7-nerved; tips truncate to rounded	Faintly 3-nerved; tips acute
Lemmas	Glabrous but midvein minutely scabrous; tips rounded	Hairs along the veins; tips obtuse to acute

Both species flower in the spring. Sclerochloa dura turns yellow as it ages, making it easy to find at the end of its growing season.

== Taxonomy ==
Sclerochloa dura was first described as Cynosurus durus by the Swedish botanist Carl Linnaeus in 1753. Linnaeus based his diagnosis on a specimen collected in southern Europe. Over the next 75 years, the species was placed in five different genera:

Name	Author	Year published
Poa dura (L.) Scop.]	Giovanni Antonio Scopoli	1771
Festuca dura (L.) Vill.	Dominique Villars	1787
Eleusine dura (L.) Lam.	Jean-Baptiste Lamarck	1791
Sclerochloa dura (L.) P.Beauv.	Palisot de Beauvois	1812
Sesleria dura (L.) Kunth	Carl Sigismund Kunth	1829

In 1812, the French botanist Palisot de Beauvois placed the species in a new genus Sclerochloa, which means "hard grass", a reference to the leathery glumes and lemmas of its inflorescence. As of September 2026, the name Sclerochloa dura (L.) P.Beauv. is widely accepted.

== Distribution and habitat ==
Sclerochloa dura is native to northwest Africa, south-central Europe, and central Asia. It was introduced in North America, South America, and Australia. In North America, it occurs in both Canada and the United States.

- Canada: British Columbia, Ontario
- United States: Arizona, Arkansas, California, Colorado, Georgia, Idaho, Illinois, Indiana, Iowa, Kansas, Kentucky, Louisiana, Maryland, Michigan, Mississippi, Missouri, Montana, Nebraska, New Mexico, New York, Ohio, Oklahoma, Oregon, Tennessee, Texas, Utah, Virginia, Washington, West Virginia, Wisconsin

In the US, it was first discovered near a woolen mill in Yonkers, New York in 1895, after which the species was not seen in New York for over a century. In 1991 it was reported to occur in a total of 18 US states; however, only a single population was known in 10 of those 18 states. Between 1995 and 2002, at least 162 additional sites were documented from Illinois, Indiana, Michigan, New York, Ohio, Ontario, Pennsylvania, West Virginia, and Wisconsin. Most of these new populations were found on fairgrounds, hence the common name "fairgrounds grass". Besides fairgrounds, it is found in lawns, campsites, roadsides, and especially athletic fields. It prefers severely compacted soils at heavily disturbed sites.

== Bibliography ==
- Brandenburg, David M.; Estes, James R.; Thieret, John W. (1991). "Hard grass (Sclerochloa dura, Poaceae) in the United States". Sida. 14 (3): 369–376.
- Brandenburg, David M.; Thieret, John W. (1996). "Sclerochloa dura (Poaceae) in Kentucky". Transactions of the Kentucky Academy of Science. 57 (1): 47–48.
- Cusick, Allison W.; Rabeler, Richard K.; Oldham, Michael J. (2002). "Hard or fairgrounds grass (Sclerochloa dura, Poaceae) in the Great Lakes region" (PDF). Michigan Bot. 41: 125–135.
- Linnaeus, Carl (1753). Species Plantarum: exhibentes plantas rite cognitas, ad genera relatas, cum differentiis specificis, nominibus trivialibus, synonymis selectis, locis natalibus, secundum systema sexuale digestas (1st ed.). Stockholm: Impensis Laurentii Salvii.
