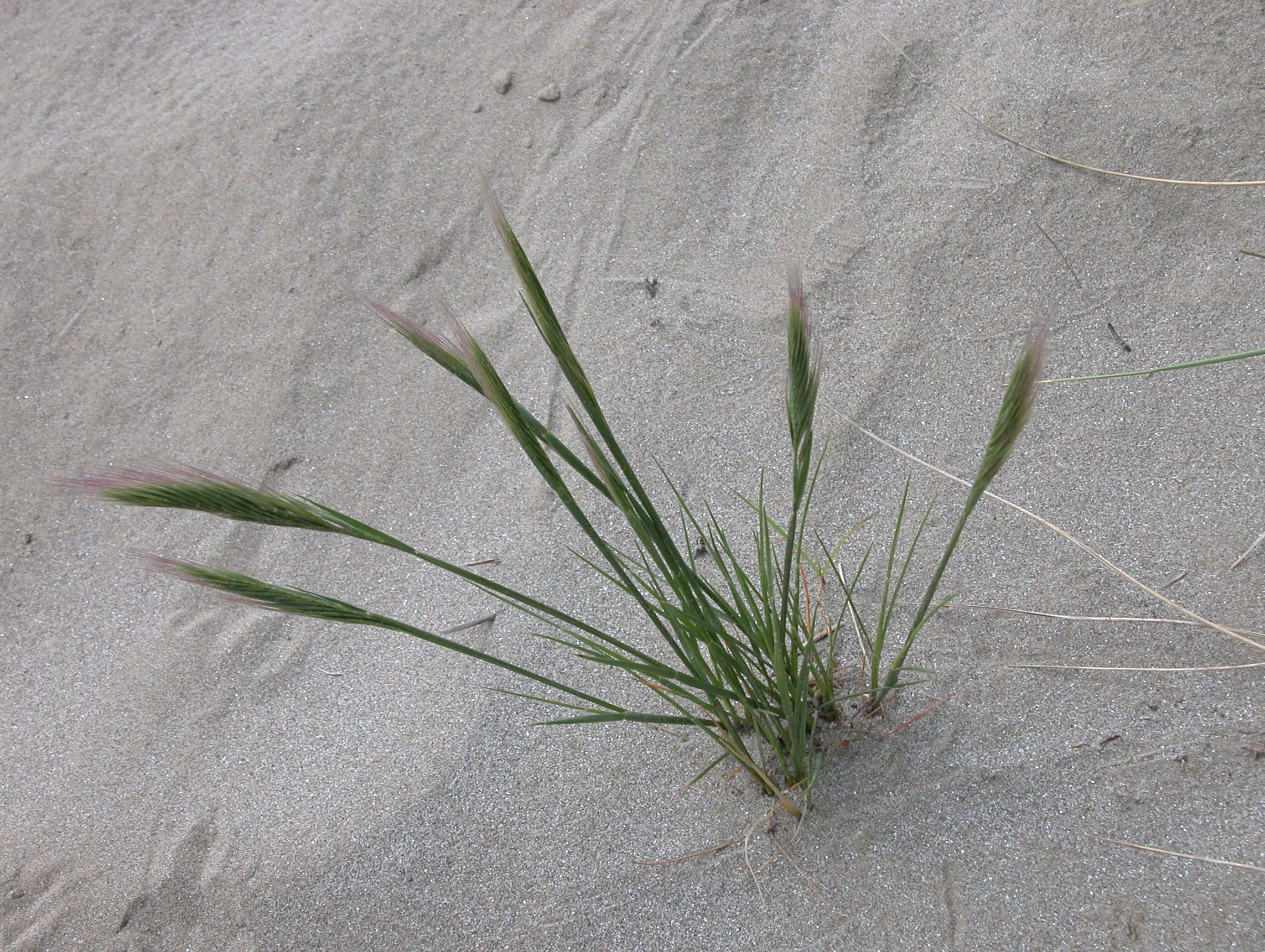

Scientific classification
- Kingdom: Plantae
- Clade: Tracheophytes
- Clade: Angiosperms
- Clade: Monocots
- Clade: Commelinids
- Order: Poales
- Family: Poaceae
- Genus: Vulpia
- Species: V. fasciculata

Binomial name
- Vulpia fasciculata (Forssk.) Fritsch

Synonyms
- Festuca fasciculata

= Vulpia fasciculata =

Species of plant

Vulpia fasciculata, the dune fescue, is a species of annual herb in the family Poaceae (true grasses). They have a self-supporting growth form and simple, broad leaves. Individuals can grow to 0.24 m.

== Sources ==
This article incorporates text from a free content work. Licensed under CC0 (license statement/permission). Text taken from Vulpia fasciculata. Encyclopedia of Life.
