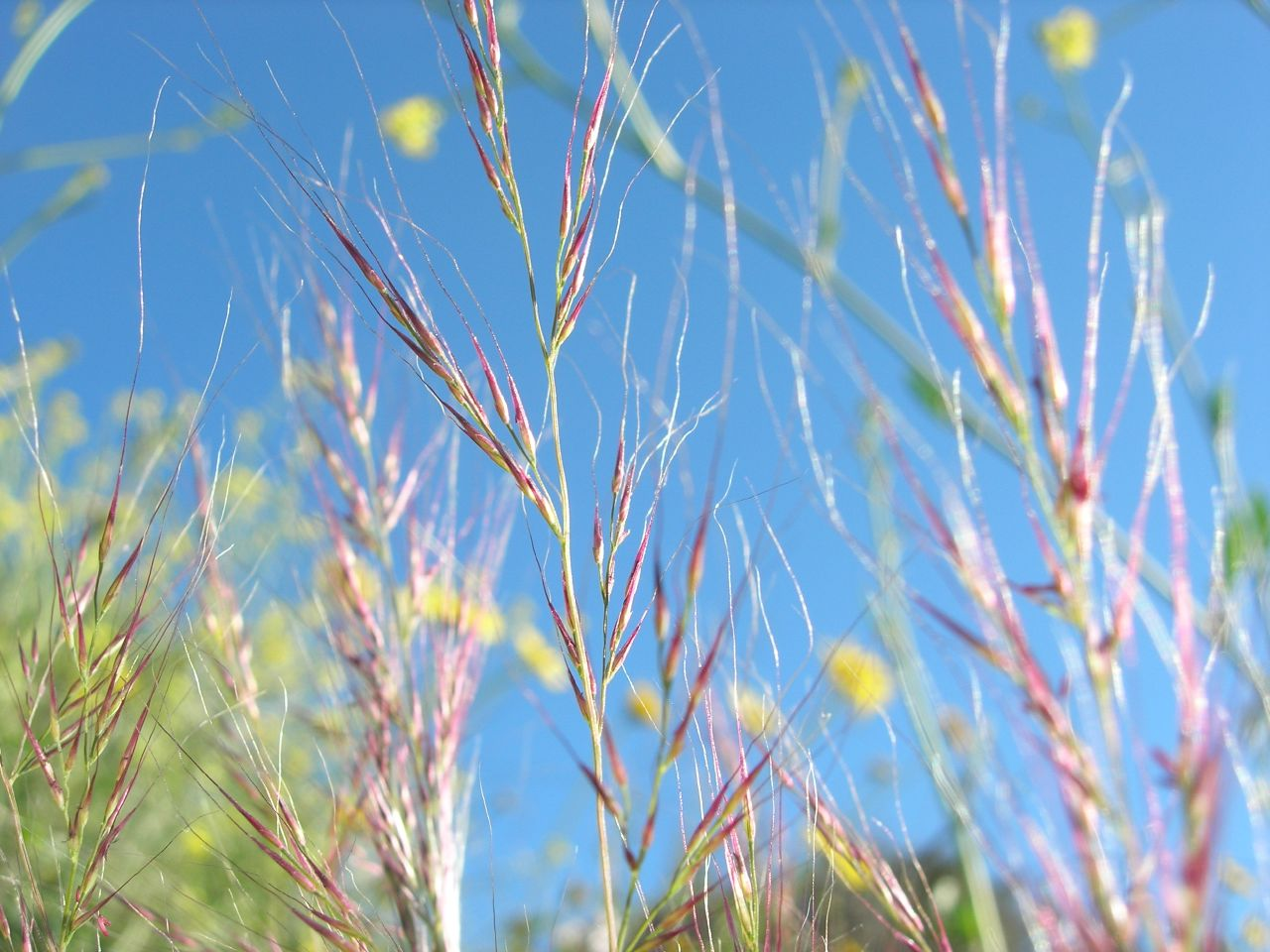

Scientific classification
- Kingdom: Plantae
- Clade: Tracheophytes
- Clade: Angiosperms
- Clade: Monocots
- Clade: Commelinids
- Order: Poales
- Family: Poaceae
- Genus: Vulpia
- Species: V. microstachys

Binomial name
- Vulpia microstachys (Nutt.) Munro

= Vulpia microstachys =

Species of grass

Vulpia microstachys is a species of grass known by the common names small fescue and small sixweeks grass. It is native to western North America from British Columbia to Colorado and New Mexico to Baja California, where it grows in many types of open habitat, including grasslands. It is dominant on some grasslands of California, and it was probably an abundant native grass before the habitat was altered by invasive non-native grasses. It occurs on serpentine soils with associates such as serpentine reedgrass (Calamagrostis ophitidis). It is also known from parts of South America. It is an annual grass producing one stem or a clump of several stems growing up to 75 centimeters tall. The inflorescence has several open branches bearing clusters of purple-tinged spikelets. The spikelet has one to six flowers. The grass is usually cleistogamous, its flowers fertilizing themselves.

There are four varieties which are sometimes difficult to tell apart; they are separated on the basis of the arrangement and amount of hairs on the spikelets.

- V. m. var. ciliata - Eastwood fescue
- V. m. var. confusa - confusing fescue
- V. m. var. microstachys - desert fescue
- V. m. var. pauciflora - Pacific fescue
