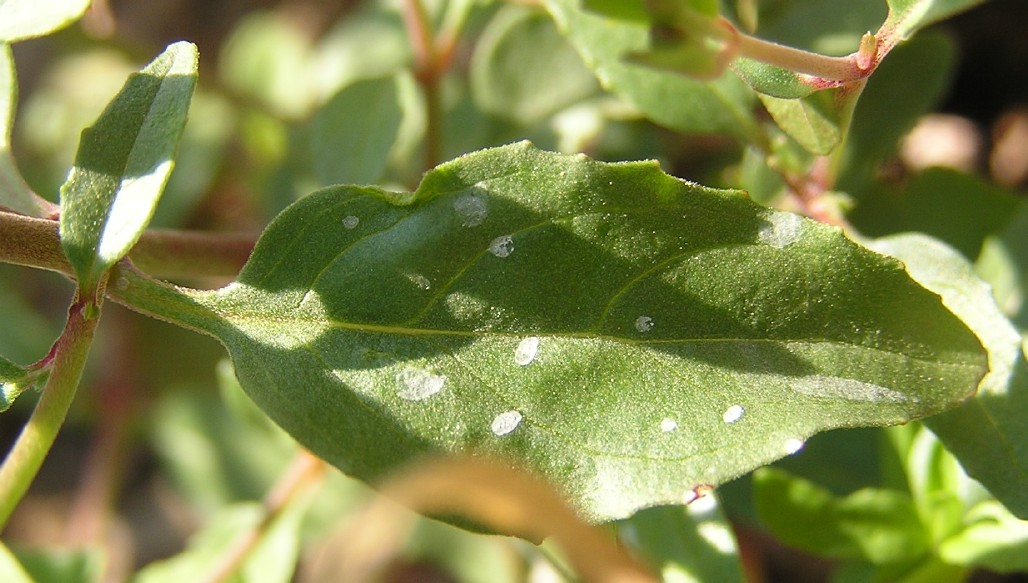

Scientific classification
- Kingdom: Plantae
- Clade: Embryophytes
- Clade: Tracheophytes
- Clade: Spermatophytes
- Clade: Angiosperms
- Clade: Eudicots
- Clade: Rosids
- Order: Myrtales
- Family: Onagraceae
- Genus: Epilobium
- Species: E. lanceolatum

Binomial name
- Epilobium lanceolatum Sebast. & Mauri

= Epilobium lanceolatum =

Species of flowering plant

Epilobium lanceolatum, the spear-leaved willowherb, is a species in the genus Epilobium, belonging to the Onagraceae or "evening primrose" family. It grows between 30 and 60 cm (12 and 24 in) high. This perennial plant has lance-shaped leaves, steadily narrowing to both ends, with long petioles; 5–7 mm, grey to green-blue, with widely toothed margins. The flowers are white fading to pink; blooming from June to August. Epilobium lanceolatum occurs across western Europe.

== Description ==
Easily confused with Epilobium montanum and E. collinum.

== Distribution and habitat ==
The only recent confirmed finding in Croatia was on Medvednica.

Very rare. Restricted to light forests on silicate substrates.

== Bibliography ==
- Strgulc Krajšek, Sumona; Šegedin, Tamara; Jogan, Nejc (2009-06-30). "Revision of Epilobium and Chamerion in the Croatian herbaria ZA and ZAHO". Natura Croatica. 18 (1): 155–167. eISSN 1848-7386.
