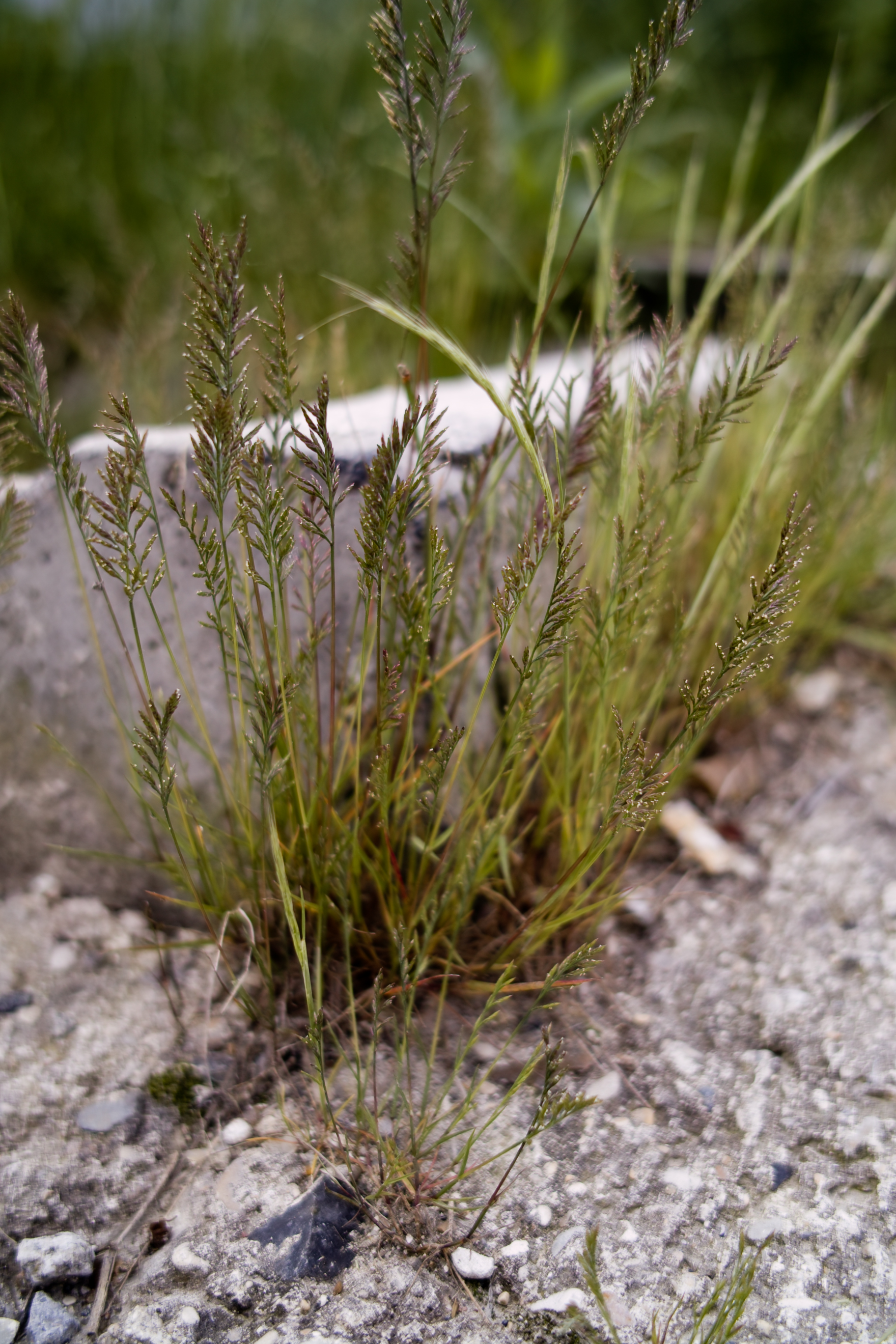
- habit

Scientific classification
- Kingdom: Plantae
- Clade: Tracheophytes
- Clade: Angiosperms
- Clade: Monocots
- Clade: Commelinids
- Order: Poales
- Family: Poaceae
- Subfamily: Pooideae
- Genus: Catapodium
- Species: C. rigidum

Binomial name
- Catapodium rigidum (L.) C.E.Hubb.

Synonyms
- List: Catapodium hemipoa (Delile ex Spreng.) Laínz; Catapodium hemipoa subsp. occidentale (Paunero) H.Scholz & S.Scholz; Catapodium occidentale Paunero; Catapodium rigidum subsp. majus (C.Presl) F.H.Perring & P.D.Sell; Catapodium rigidum f. robustum (Duval-Jouve) O.Bolòs & Vigo; Catapodium rigidum subsp. spicatum (Trab.) Rivas Mart.; Catapodium rigidum var. spicatum (Trab.) O.Bolòs & Vigo; Catapodium zwierleinii (Lojac.) Brullo; Desmazeria rigida (L.) Tutin; Desmazeria rigida subsp. hemipoa (Delile ex Spreng.) Stace; Desmazeria rigida var. major (C.Presl) Stace; Desmazeria rigida var. spicata (Trab.) O.Bolòs & Vigo; Diplachne rigida (L.) Chapm.; Festuca divaricata Roth; Festuca hemipoa Delile ex Spreng.; Festuca maritima subsp. hemipoa (Delile ex Spreng.) Ball; Festuca rigens Trin. ex Steud.; Festuca rigida (L.) Raspail; Glyceria rigida (L.) Sm.; Megastachya pulchella Roem. & Schult.; Megastachya rigida (L.) Roem. & Schult.; Poa cristata Walter; Poa hemipoa (Delile ex Spreng.) Loret & Barrandon; Poa pulchella Steven ex M.Bieb.; Poa rigida L.; Sclerochloa filiformis Tornab.; Sclerochloa hemipoa (Delile ex Spreng.) Guss.; Sclerochloa patens C.Presl; Sclerochloa racemosa (Sennen) Sennen; Sclerochloa rigida (L.) Link; Sclerochloa rigida var. major C.Presl; Sclerochloa zwierleinii Lojac.; Scleropoa hemipoa (Delile ex Spreng.) Parl.; Scleropoa racemosa Sennen; Scleropoa rigida (L.) Griseb.; Scleropoa rigida subsp. hemipoa (Delile ex Spreng.) Bonnier & Layens; Scleropoa subspicata Sennen; Scleropoa villaris Sennen & Mauricio; Synaphe rigida (L.) Dulac; Triticum hemipoa (Delile ex Spreng.) Delile ex Ten.

= Catapodium rigidum =

Species of plant

Catapodium rigidum, ferngrass, is a species of annual grass in the family Poaceae (true grasses), distributed around the Mediterranean and the Middle East. It has been widely introduced throughout drier parts of the world, including parts of North America, South America, South Africa, Korea, Australia, and New Zealand. Individuals can reach 20 cm (8 in).

== Identification ==
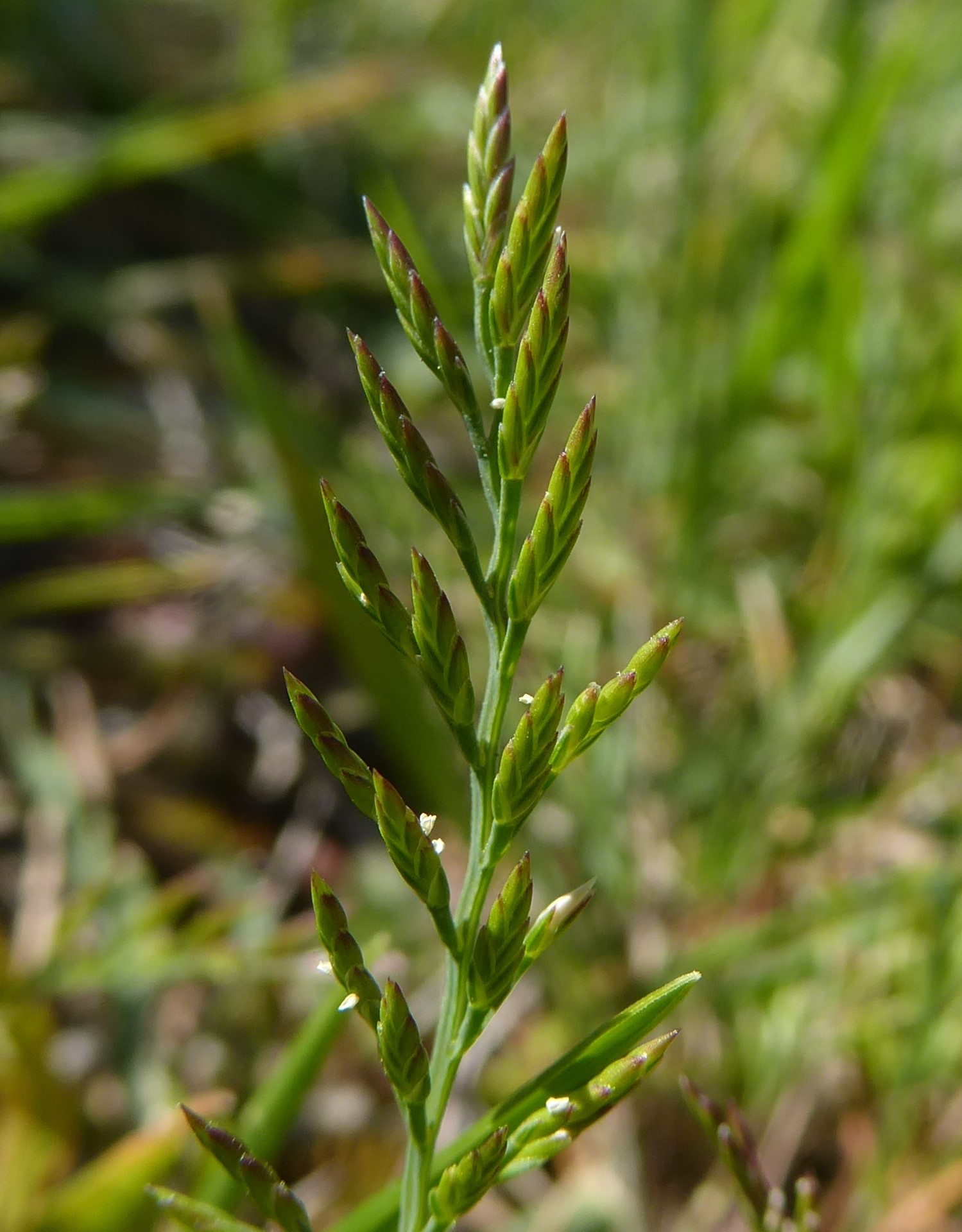
The flowerhead is branched and has a ridged stem

Fern-grass can be difficult to distinguish from sea fern-grass in places where they occur together, but it has a more open panicle and the stalk to the inflorescence is ridged, whereas it is rounded on one side in sea fern-grass.

== Subtaxa ==
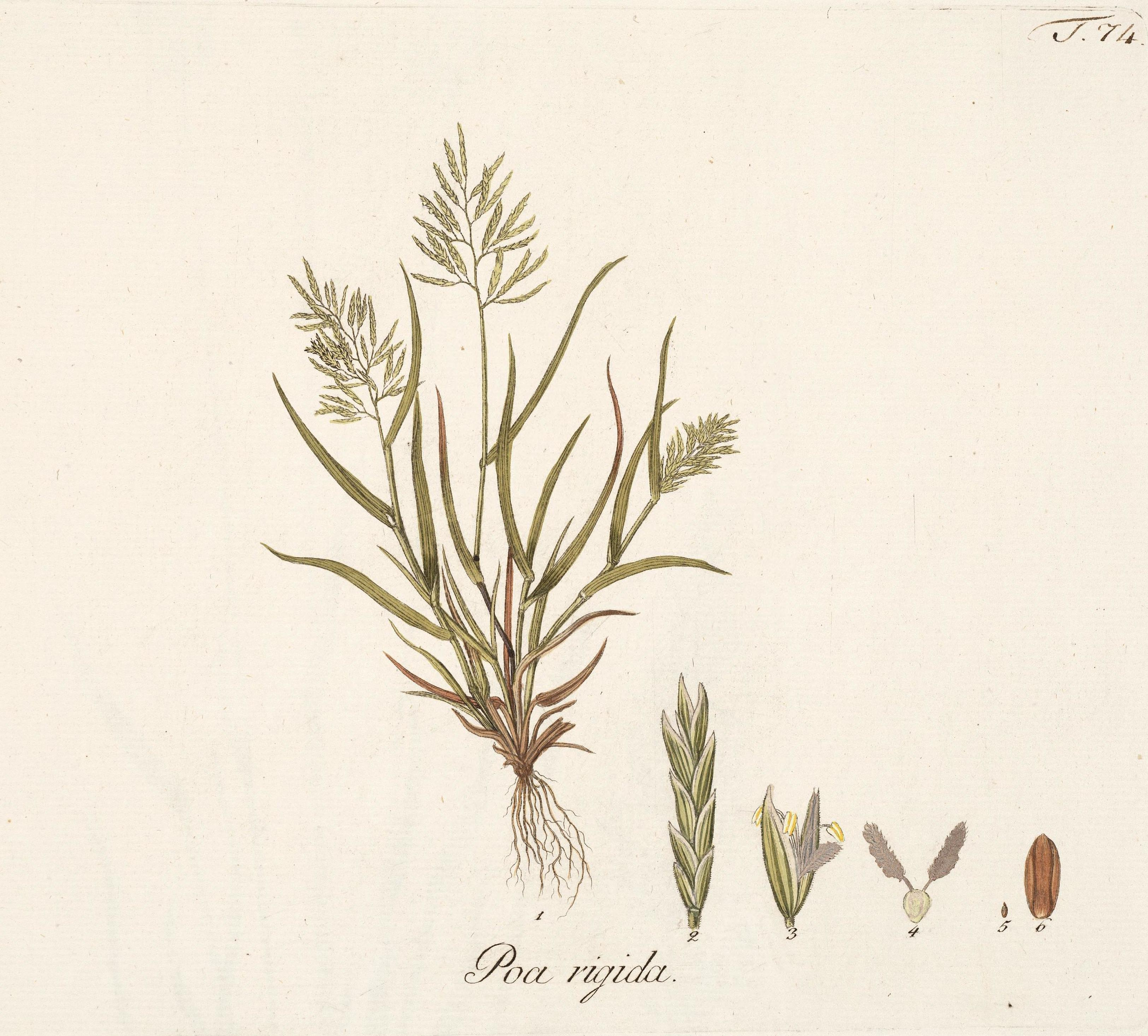
Botanical illustration

The following subtaxa are accepted:

- Catapodium rigidum subsp. hemipoa (Delile ex Spreng.) Kerguélen - more narrowly distributed from Macaronesia and the Mediterranean to Iran
- Catapodium rigidum var. majus (C.Presl) M.Laínz - Middle East
- Catapodium rigidum subsp. rigidum – entire range, including introductions
