= Agropyropsis =

Scientific classification
- Kingdom: Plantae
- Clade: Tracheophytes
- Clade: Angiosperms
- Clade: Monocots
- Clade: Commelinids
- Order: Poales
- Family: Poaceae
- Subfamily: Pooideae
- Supertribe: Poodae
- Tribe: Poeae
- Subtribe: Parapholiinae
- Genus: Agropyropsis (Batt. & Trab.) A.Camus
- Species: A. lolium

Binomial name
- Agropyropsis lolium (Balansa ex Coss. & Durieu) A.Camus

Synonyms
- Catapodium subg. Agropyropsis Trab. 1904; Catapodium sect. Agropyropsis Batt. & Trab. 1895; Agropyron lolium (Balansa) Trab.; Catapodium lolium (Balansa ex Coss. & Durieu) Hack. (type species); Festuca lolium Balansa ex Coss. & Durieu; Triticum lolium (Balansa ex Coss. & Durieu) Trab.

Monotypic genus of grasses

Agropyropsis is a monotypic genus of grasses closely related to Catapodium. It is native to the Batna Province in northeastern Algeria, and only contains a single species, Agropyropsis lolium. It once included a second species, Agropyropsis gracilis, which has since been renamed and moved to Lolium canariense.
