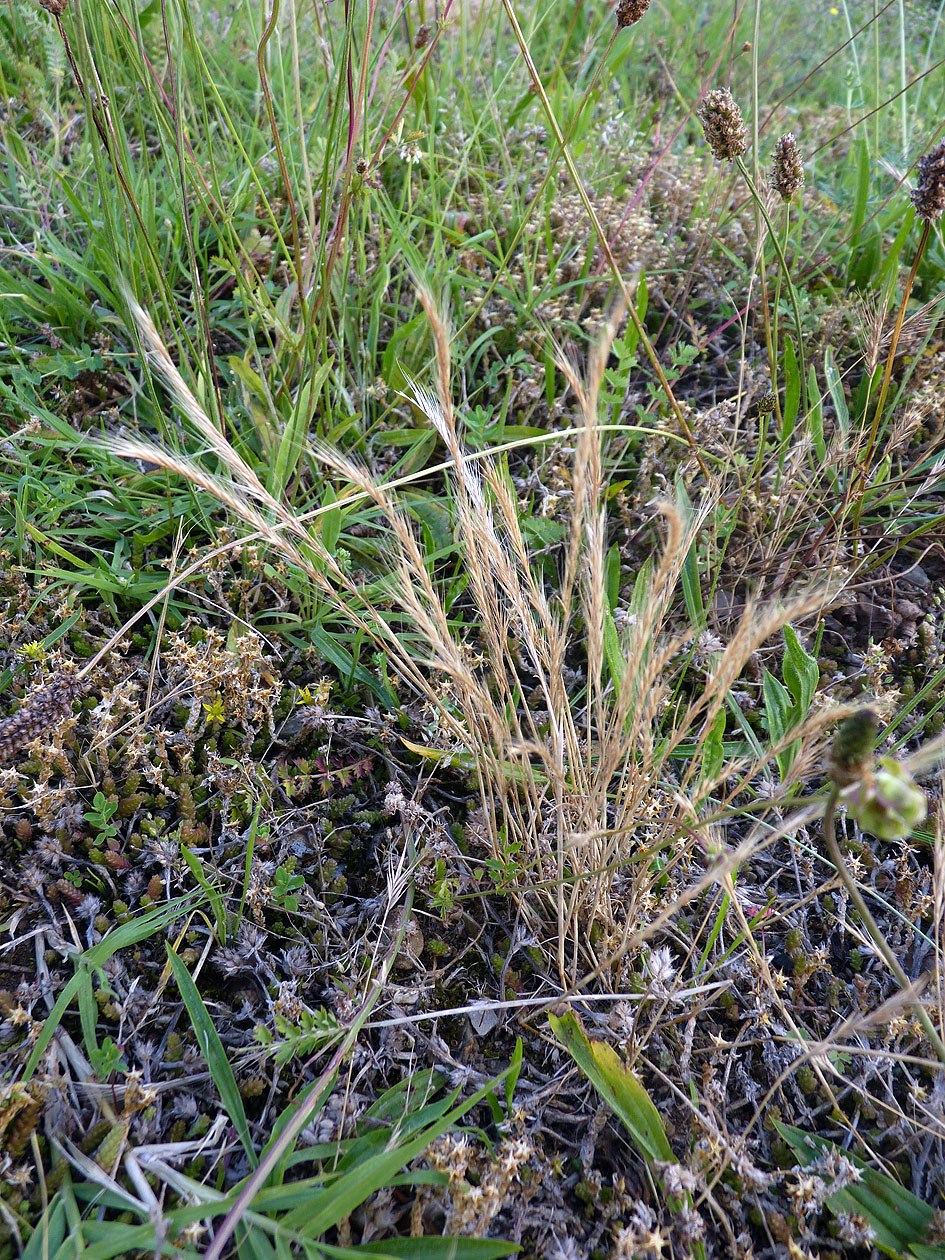

Scientific classification
- Kingdom: Plantae
- Clade: Tracheophytes
- Clade: Angiosperms
- Clade: Monocots
- Clade: Commelinids
- Order: Poales
- Family: Poaceae
- Genus: Vulpia
- Species: V. ciliata

Binomial name
- Vulpia ciliata Dumort.

Synonyms
- Festuca ciliata

= Vulpia ciliata =

Species of plant

Vulpia ciliata is a species of plant in the family Poaceae (true grasses).

== Sources ==
This article incorporates text from a free content work. Licensed under CC0 (license statement/permission). Text taken from Vulpia ciliata. Encyclopedia of Life.
