= Desmazeria pignattii =

Scientific classification
- Kingdom: Plantae
- Clade: Tracheophytes
- Clade: Angiosperms
- Clade: Monocots
- Clade: Commelinids
- Order: Poales
- Family: Poaceae
- Subfamily: Pooideae
- Genus: Desmazeria
- Species: D. pignattii

Binomial name
- Desmazeria pignattii Brullo & Pavone

Species of plant

Desmazeria pignattii is a species of plant in the family Poaceae (true grasses). It is endemic to Malta and southeastern Sicily.
