= Diarrhena obovata =

Scientific classification
- Kingdom: Plantae
- Clade: Tracheophytes
- Clade: Angiosperms
- Clade: Monocots
- Clade: Commelinids
- Order: Poales
- Family: Poaceae
- Subfamily: Pooideae
- Genus: Diarrhena
- Species: D. obovata

Binomial name
- Diarrhena obovata (Gleason) Brandenburg

Synonyms
- Diarrhena americana var. obovata Gleason

Species of plant

Diarrhena obovata, the hairy beakgrain or obovate beakgrain, is a species of flowering plant in the cool-season grass subfamily Pooideae. It is native to the north-central and east-central United States. A perennial reaching 4 ft (1.2 m), it is typically found growing in rich woodlands.
