= Sphenopus divaricatus =

Scientific classification
- Kingdom: Plantae
- Clade: Tracheophytes
- Clade: Angiosperms
- Clade: Monocots
- Clade: Commelinids
- Order: Poales
- Family: Poaceae
- Subfamily: Pooideae
- Genus: Sphenopus
- Species: S. divaricatus

Binomial name
- Sphenopus divaricatus (Gouan) Rchb.

Synonyms
- Synonymy: Diarrhena divaricata (Gouan) Raspail; Poa divaricata Gouan (1773) (basionym); Festuca expansa (J.F.Gmel.) Kunth; Festuca gouanii Mutel; Festuca sphenopus Trin., not validly publ.; Glyceria sphenopus Steud.; Nephelochloa breviglumis Trautv.; Poa expansa J.F.Gmel.; Poa reptatrix Willk. & Lange, pro syn.; Sclerochloa divaricata (Gouan) P.Beauv.; Sclerochloa expansa (J.F.Gmel.) Link; Sclerochloa triticum J.Woods; Sphenopus divaricatus var. confertus (Hausskn.) Halácsy; Sphenopus divaricatus f. permicranthus (Hausskn.) Täckh.; Sphenopus divaricatus subsp. permicranthus (Hausskn.) H.Scholz; Sphenopus gouanii Trin., nom. superfl.; Sphenopus gouanii var. confertus Hausskn.; Sphenopus gouanii var. permicranthus Hausskn.

Species of plant

Sphenopus divaricatus is a species of grass in the family Poaceae (true grasses). It is an annual native to the Mediterranean Basin countries of North Africa, southern Europe, and western Asia and eastwards to Tajikistan, Kyrgyzstan, and Pakistan.

== Sources ==
This article incorporates text from a free content work. Licensed under CC0 (license statement/permission). Text taken from Sphenopus divaricatus. Encyclopedia of Life.
