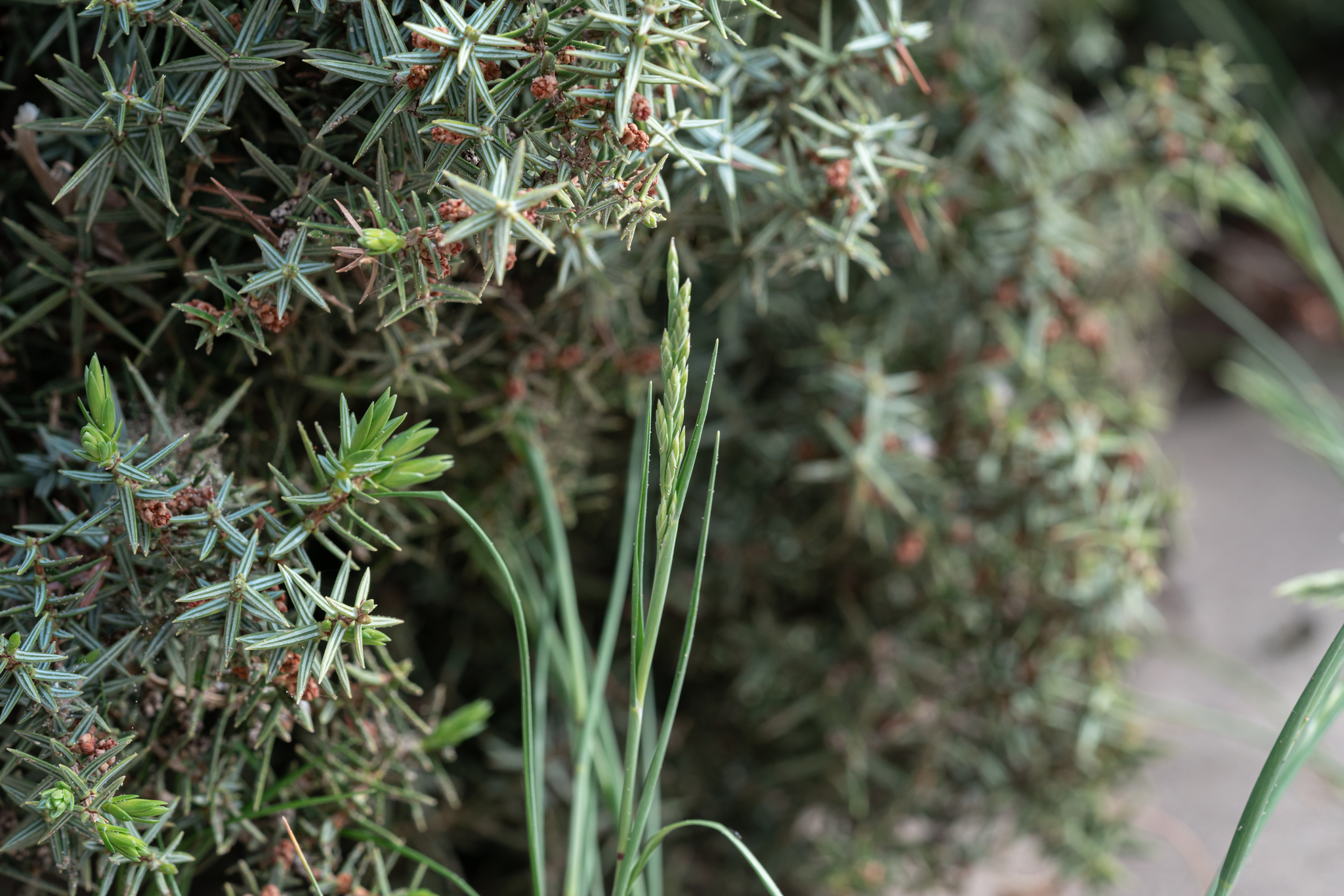
- In Greece

Scientific classification
- Kingdom: Plantae
- Clade: Embryophytes
- Clade: Tracheophytes
- Clade: Angiosperms
- Clade: Monocots
- Clade: Commelinids
- Order: Poales
- Family: Poaceae
- Subfamily: Pooideae
- Genus: Cutandia
- Species: C. maritima

Binomial name
- Cutandia maritima (L.) Barbey

Synonyms
- Agropyron maritimum (L.) P.Beauv.; Diarrhena maritima (L.) Raspail; Sclerochloa maritima (L.) Sweet; Scleropoa maritima (L.) Parl.; Triticum maritimum L.; Brachypodium maritimum Roem. & Schult.; Cutandia lanceolata (Forssk.) Benth. ex T.Durand & Schinz; Festuca lanceolata Forssk.

= Cutandia maritima =

Species of plant

Cutandia maritima is a species of herb in the family Poaceae (true grasses). It is native to southern Europe, North Africa, the Canary Islands and Western Asia.

== Sources ==
This article incorporates text from a free content work. Licensed under CC0 (license statement/permission). Text taken from Cutandia maritima. Encyclopedia of Life.
