= Vulpia elliotea =

Scientific classification
- Kingdom: Plantae
- Clade: Tracheophytes
- Clade: Angiosperms
- Clade: Monocots
- Clade: Commelinids
- Order: Poales
- Family: Poaceae
- Genus: Vulpia
- Species: V. elliotea

Binomial name
- Vulpia elliotea (Raf.) Fern.

Synonyms
- Vulpia sciurea

Species of grass

Vulpia elliotea, known by the common name sand fescue or squirreltail fescue, is an annual grass native to the southeastern United States. Its specific epithet elliotea is named for its discoverer, Stephen Elliott.

== Description ==
Vulpia elliotea is an erect grass, growing up to 50 cm (20 in) in height. Its leaf sheaths are glabrous, and its blades are typically glabrous though they can be scabrous above. The involute blades are 0.5–1.5 mm (0.020–0.059 in) wide. The inflorescence is 10 cm (3.9 in) long. The erect panicle has ascending spikelets 4–5 mm (0.16–0.20 in) long. The first glume is 2 mm (0.079 in) long; the second glume is 3.5 mm (0.14 in) long. The typically pubescent lemmas are 2–3.5 mm (0.079–0.138 in) long, and the awns are two to four times as long. The grass flowers from May to June.

== Distribution and habitat ==
Vulpia elliotea grows in dry, sandy prairies from New Jersey to Texas, up to southern Illinois and Missouri.
