= Halopyrum =

Scientific classification
- Kingdom: Plantae
- Clade: Embryophytes
- Clade: Tracheophytes
- Clade: Spermatophytes
- Clade: Angiosperms
- Clade: Monocots
- Clade: Commelinids
- Order: Poales
- Family: Poaceae
- Subfamily: Chloridoideae
- Tribe: Cynodonteae
- Subtribe: Tripogoninae
- Genus: Halopyrum; Stapf
- Species: H. mucronatum

Binomial name
- Halopyrum mucronatum (L.) Stapf

Synonyms
- Uniola mucronata L.; Briza mucronata (L.) Lam.; Eragrostis mucronata (L.) Deflers; Brachypodium unioloides (C.Presl) Link; Festuca unioloides (C.Presl) Kunth; Poa triticoides Decne.; Desmazeria unioloides (C.Presl) Deflers

Genus of grasses

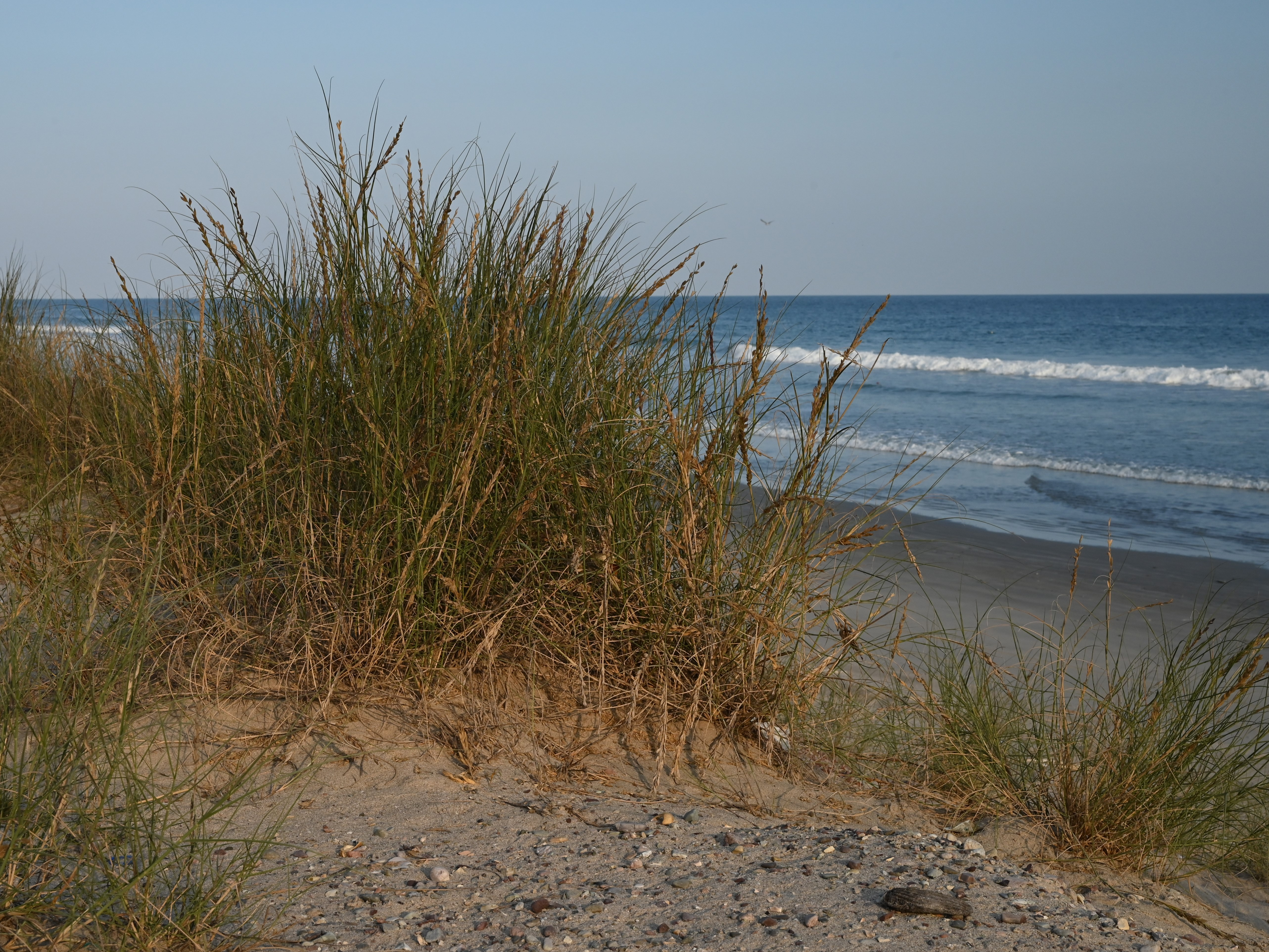
Halopyrum mucronatum between Al Khabbah and Ar Ruays, Ash Sharqiyah South Gov., Oman.

Halopyrum is a genus of Asian and African plants in the grass family. The only known species is Halopyrum mucronatum, native to the Indian subcontinent, Iran, the Arabian Peninsula, Socotra, Madagascar, and eastern + northeastern Africa (from Egypt to Mozambique).
