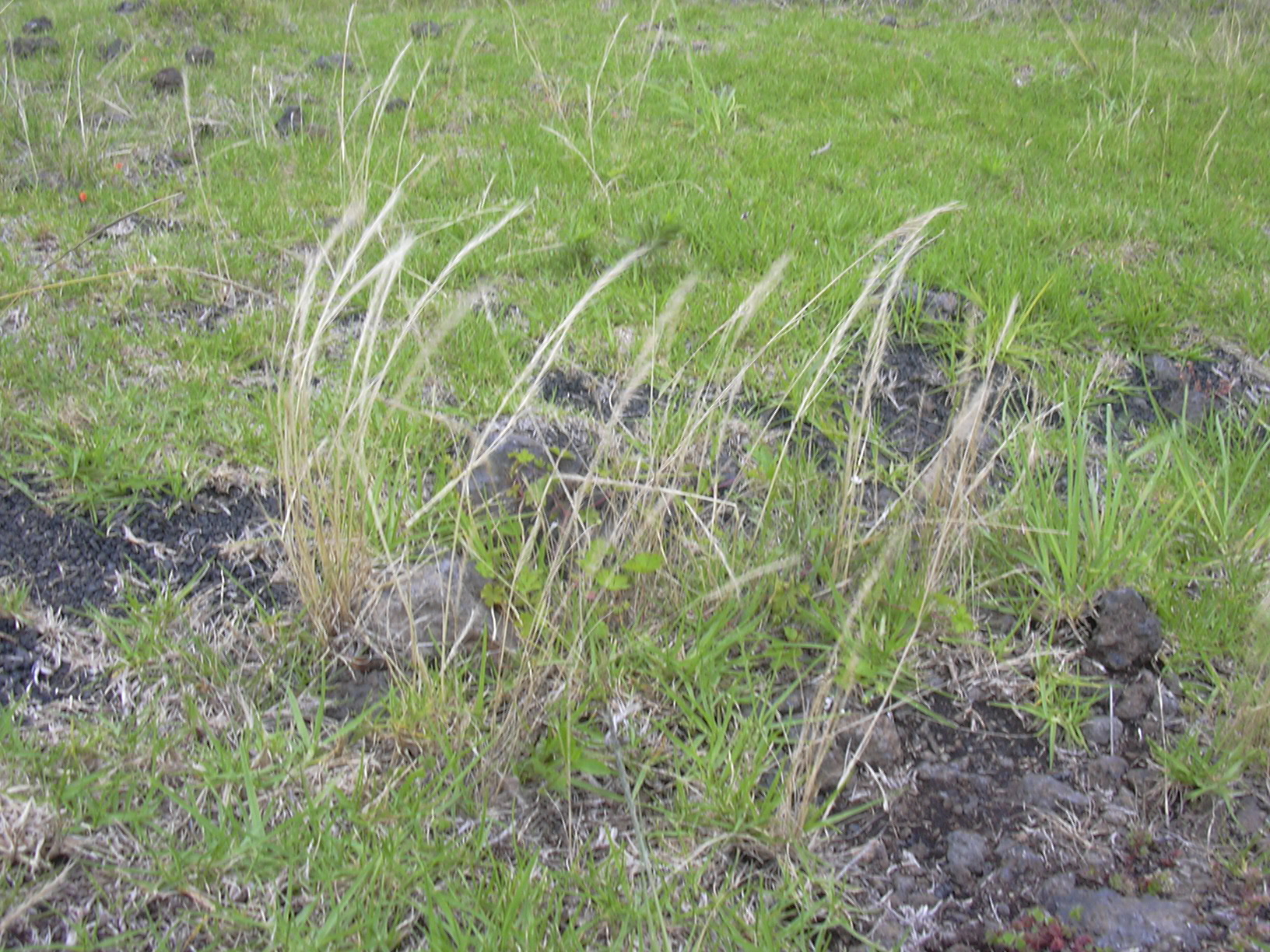

Scientific classification
- Kingdom: Plantae
- Clade: Tracheophytes
- Clade: Angiosperms
- Clade: Monocots
- Clade: Commelinids
- Order: Poales
- Family: Poaceae
- Genus: Vulpia
- Species: V. bromoides

Binomial name
- Vulpia bromoides (L.) Gray

Synonyms
- Bromus dertonensis All. Festuca bromoides L. Festuca dertonensis (All.) Aschers. & Graebn. Vulpia dertonensis (All.) Gola

= Vulpia bromoides =

Species of grass

Vulpia bromoides, squirreltail fescue, barren fescue or brome fescue, is a species of grass in the family Poaceae. It is a winter annual native to Europe, North Africa, and West Asia, but has been introduced to parts of the America, South Africa, Australia, New Zealand and isolated parts of East Asia.
