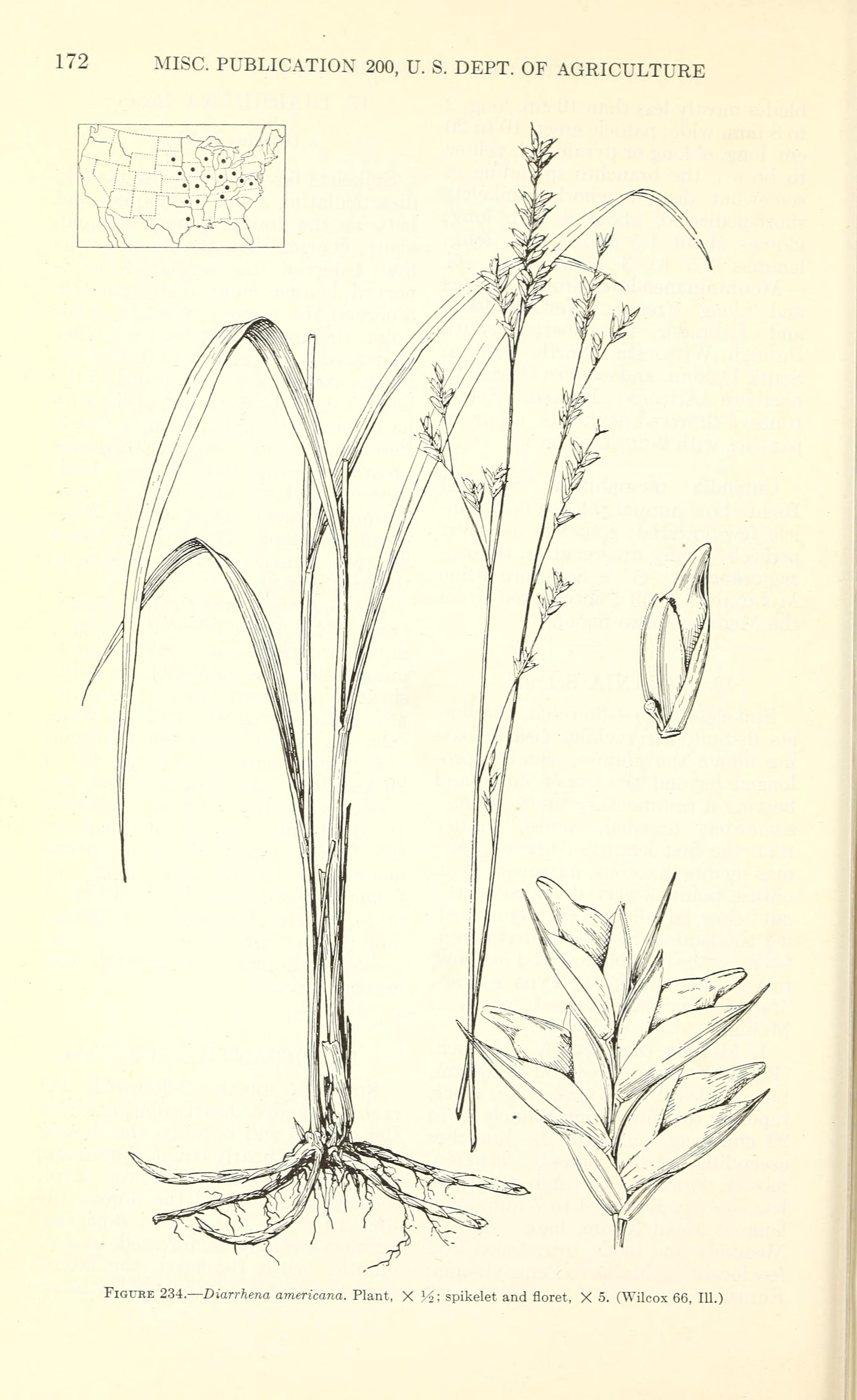
- Botanical illustration

Scientific classification
- Kingdom: Plantae
- Clade: Tracheophytes
- Clade: Angiosperms
- Clade: Monocots
- Clade: Commelinids
- Order: Poales
- Family: Poaceae
- Subfamily: Pooideae
- Genus: Diarrhena
- Species: D. americana

Binomial name
- Diarrhena americana P.Beauv. 1812

Synonyms
- Festuca diandra Michx 1803 not Moench 1794; Diarina festucoides Raf.; Korycarpus arundinaceus Zea ex Lag.; Roemeria zeae Roem. & Schult.; Corycarpus diandrus Kuntze; Diarina sylvatica Raf.; Diarrhena arundinacea (Zea ex Lag.) Rydb.; Diarrhena festucoides (Raf.) Fernald; Festuca diandra Michx.

= Diarrhena americana =

Species of grass

Diarrhena americana, also known as American beak grass or American beakgrain, is a native, perennial bunchgrass of North America.

Historically, Diarrhena americana was the only species of beak grass recognized in the United States; however studies have suggested that the known beak grass is to be classified into two distinct species, Diarrhena americana and Diarrhena obovata.

== Distribution ==
Diarrhena americana naturally occurs throughout the Midwestern United States, including in eastern Oklahoma and Missouri; south to Alabama; east to Kentucky, the Appalachian Mountains and northern Maryland; and north to southern Illinois, Indiana, Ohio, and southern Michigan.

The grass plant lives in rich cove forests and woodlands, preferring to grow in the moist soils of shaded ledges and riverbanks. It grows in rich, moist woodlands from Missouri to Maryland and south to Oklahoma and Alabama.

== Description ==
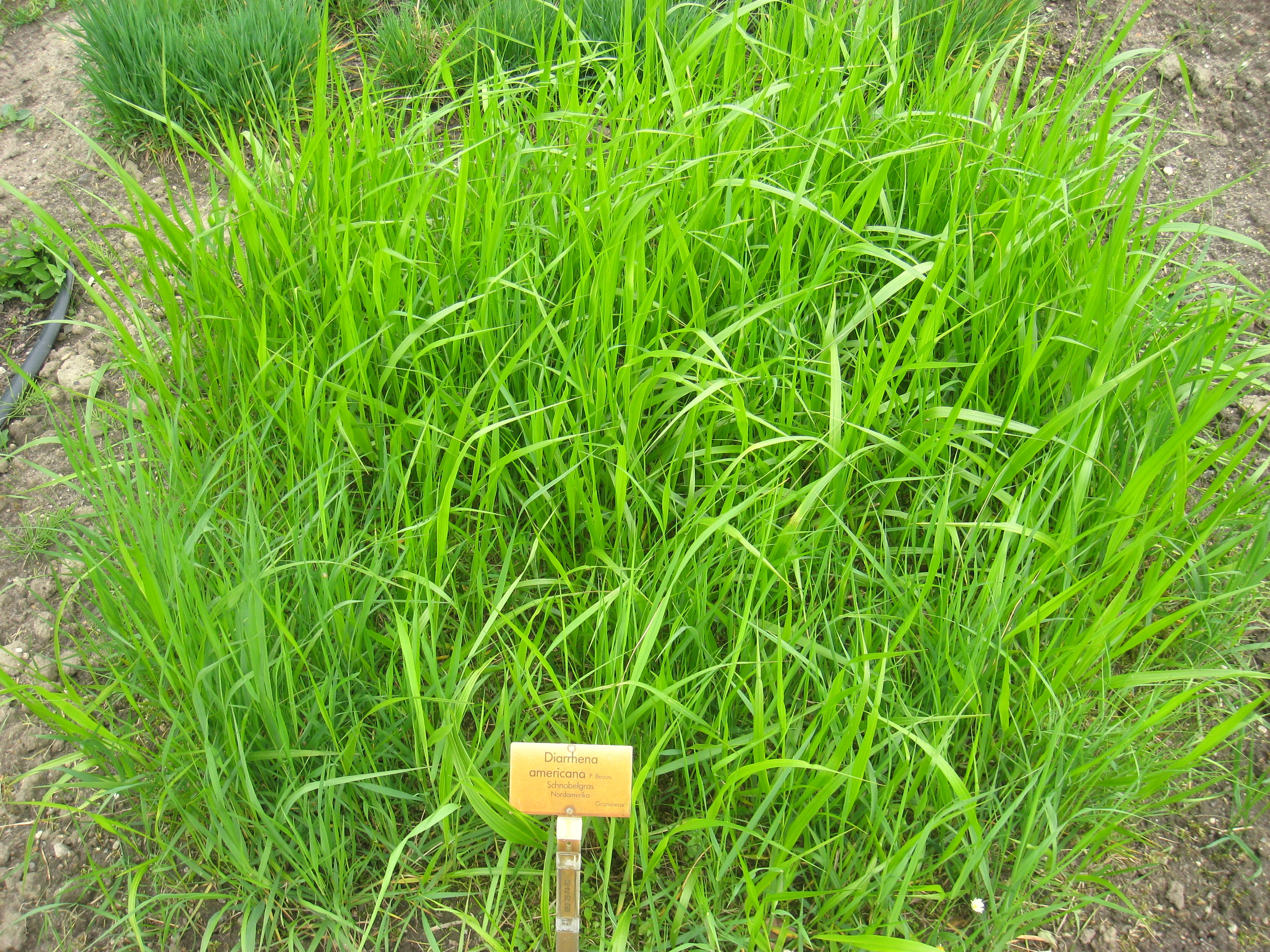
In cultivation at the Berlin Botanical Garden

Diarrhena americana is a bunchgrass that grows in 2–3 feet (0.61–0.91 m) tall clumps. It has bright green leaf blades, that can grow up to 0.75 inches (1.9 cm) in width.

These perennial plants can grow flowers that grow above the foliage, with 3 inch tall floral spikes, during the early to mid-summer. The culms range from 60–131 cm (24–52 in) high.

By late summer the flowers turn into hard, brown seed heads. Each seed is reduced to a blunt beak, which is where the common name of beak grass comes from, and this beak is dispersed.

== Cultivation ==
Diarrhena americana is cultivated as an ornamental grass, grown in traditional and wildlife gardens, and in natural landscaping projects.

It is considered an easy plant to grow and maintain, not needing much sun or water while generally being a tough plant. It will tolerate drought, heavy shade, competition from eastern black walnuts, and urban air pollution. When available, the plant will grow into dense clumps in moist rich soils in full shade.

== Conservation ==
Diarrhena americana is a listed endangered species in Maryland and Wisconsin, and a threatened species in Michigan.
