= Festuca salzmannii =

Scientific classification
- Kingdom: Plantae
- Clade: Tracheophytes
- Clade: Angiosperms
- Clade: Monocots
- Clade: Commelinids
- Order: Poales
- Family: Poaceae
- Subfamily: Pooideae
- Genus: Festuca
- Species: F. salzmannii

Binomial name
- Festuca salzmannii (Boiss.) Boiss. ex Coss.

Synonyms
- Brachypodium salzmannii (Boiss.) Nyman; Catapodium salzmannii (Boiss.) Boiss.; Narduroides salzmannii (Boiss.) Rouy; Nardurus filiformis C.Vicioso, nom. superfl.; Nardurus salzmannii Boiss.; Triticum filiforme Salzm. ex Boiss., pro syn.

Species of plant

Festuca salzmannii is a species of flowering plant in the family Poaceae (grasses), native to the Mediterranean from Spain to Cyprus, and to Turkey. It has been placed in the genus Narduroides as the sole species Narduroides salzmannii.

== Description ==
Festuca salzmannii is an annual with slender, erect stems up to 40 cm (1 ft 4 in) tall that are relatively rigid. The inflorescence can be up to 23 cm (9 in) long, usually unbranched, but rarely with a few branches. Individual spikelets have 4–6 florets and are typically 4–7 mm (0.2–0.3 in) long. The ripe grains are 1–1.8 mm (0.04–0.07 in) long.

== Taxonomy ==
The species was first described by Pierre Edmond Boissier in 1844 as Nardurus salzmannii. In 1851, Boissier transferred it to the genus Festuca. In 1913, Georges Rouy placed it as the sole species in the genus Narduroides. As of November 2024, Plants of the World Online regarded Narduroides as a synonym of Festuca.

== Distribution ==
Festuca salzmannii is native to Spain, France, Morocco, Algeria, Libya, Greece, the East Aegean islands, Cyprus, and Turkey.
