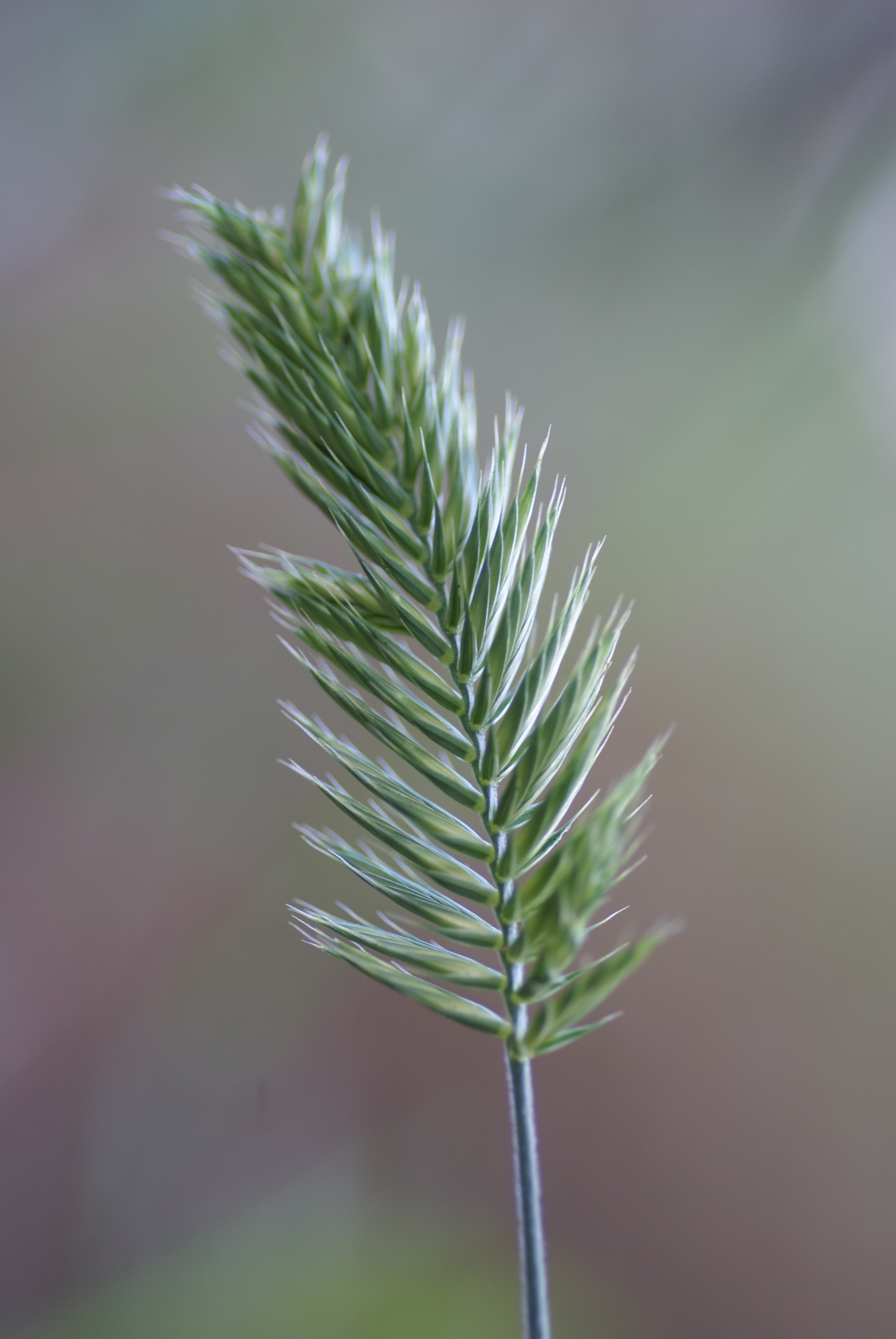

Scientific classification
- Kingdom: Plantae
- Clade: Tracheophytes
- Clade: Angiosperms
- Clade: Monocots
- Clade: Commelinids
- Order: Poales
- Family: Poaceae
- Subfamily: Pooideae
- Supertribe: Poodae
- Tribe: Poeae
- Subtribe: Loliinae
- Genus: Wangenheimia; Moench
- Species: W. lima

Binomial name
- Wangenheimia lima (L.) Trin.

Synonyms
- Catapodium pauciflorum (Merino) Brullo, Giusso, Miniss. & Spamp.; Cynosurus lima L.; Dactylis lima (L.) Steud.; Dactylis disticha Ball; Desmazeria castellana Willk.; Desmazeria pauciflora Merino; Desmazeria marina subsp. pauciflora (Merino) Silva Pando; Dinebra lima (L.) P.Beauv.; Eleusine lima (L.) Lam.; Festuca rhachiantha Steud.; Poa lima (L.) Trin.; Wangenheimia disticha Moench; Wangenheimia lima var. glabra Maire; Wangenheimia lima var. villosula Maire

= Wangenheimia =

Genus of grasses

Wangenheimia is a monotypic genus of plants in the grass family. The only known species is Wangenheimia lima.

== Description ==
An annual ornamental grass, which bears unusual, feather-like or herringbone-shaped seedheads on long, wiry stems, all summer long. It can grow up to 60 cm (24 in) tall, with long green leaves that have shades of silver when young.

== Taxonomy ==
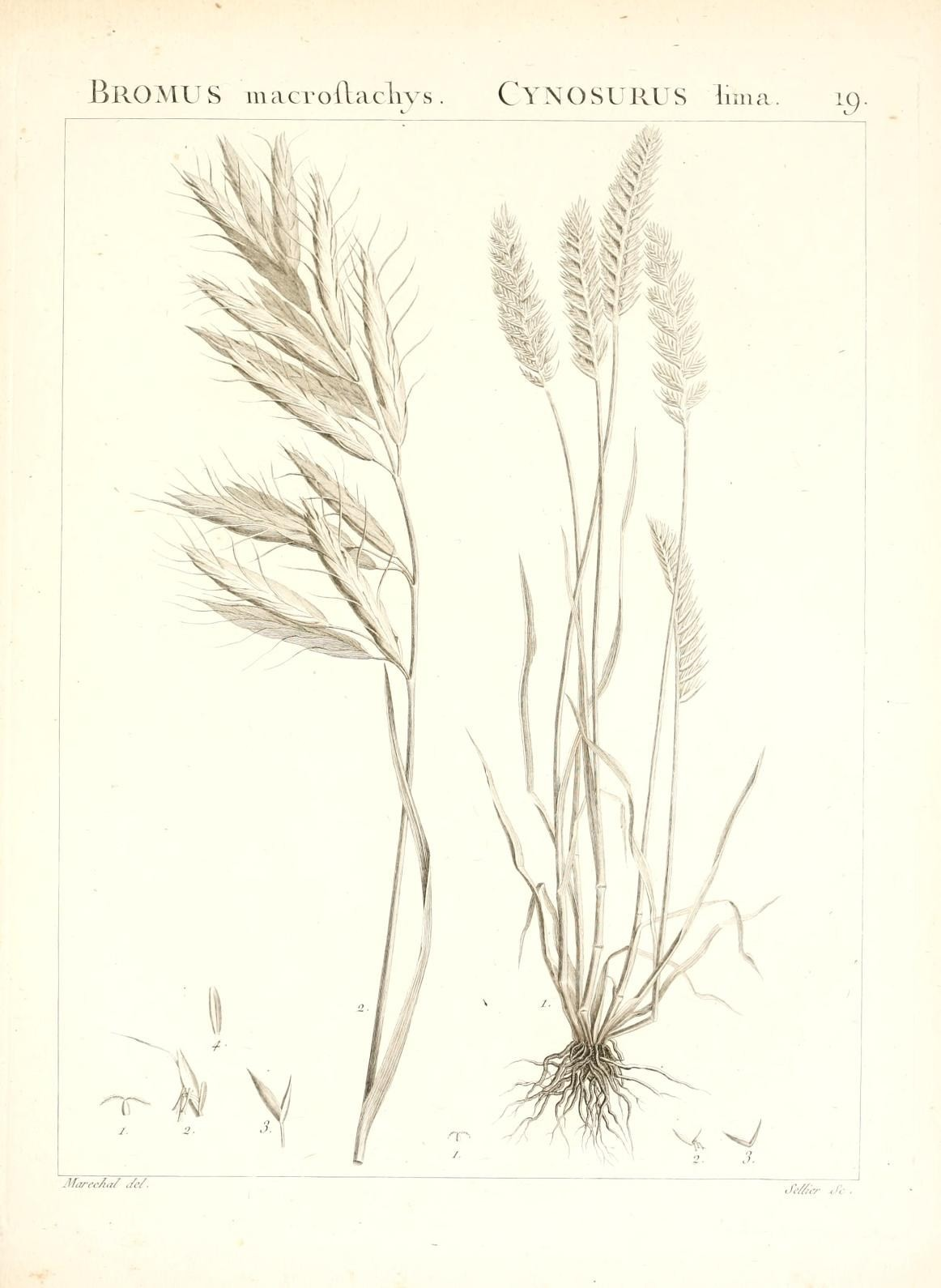
Illustration of Cynosurus lima (synonym of Wangenheimia lima), in Flora Atlantica, 1800

The genus is named after the Prussian botanist Friedrich Adam Julius von Wangenheim (1749–1800). The Latin specific epithet of lima refers to the Latin noun of file, often referring to a rough surface. Wangenheimia was first described and published in Methodus on page 200 in 1794. The species was first published in Fund. Agrost. on page 132 in 1820.

The genus is not recognized by the United States Department of Agriculture and the Agricultural Research Service, listing it as a synonym of Festuca L. and they do not list any known species.

== Distribution ==
It is native to Spain and Portugal (in Europe) and Morocco, Algeria and Tunisia (in North Africa).

It is found in grasslands, at altitudes of 500 metres (1,600 ft) above sea level.

== Cultivation ==
It has been cultivated under the name Wangenheimia 'Lima Vulcan', Wangenheimia lima 'Vulcan', or Wangenheimia lima ‘Vulcan’ and “Vulcan Grass”.
