= Sphenopus =

Scientific classification
- Kingdom: Plantae
- Clade: Tracheophytes
- Clade: Angiosperms
- Clade: Monocots
- Clade: Commelinids
- Order: Poales
- Family: Poaceae
- Subfamily: Pooideae
- Subtribe: Parapholiinae
- Genus: Sphenopus; Trin.

Type species
- Sphenopus gouanii (syn of S. divaricatus) Trin.

Genus of grasses

Sphenopus (common name coastal grass), is a genus of Asian and Mediterranean plants in the grass family.

Species

- Sphenopus divaricatus (Gouan) Rchb. - Mediterranean and adjacent regions from Canary Islands and Portugal to Tajikistan
- Sphenopus ehrenbergii Hausskn. - Libya, Tunisia
