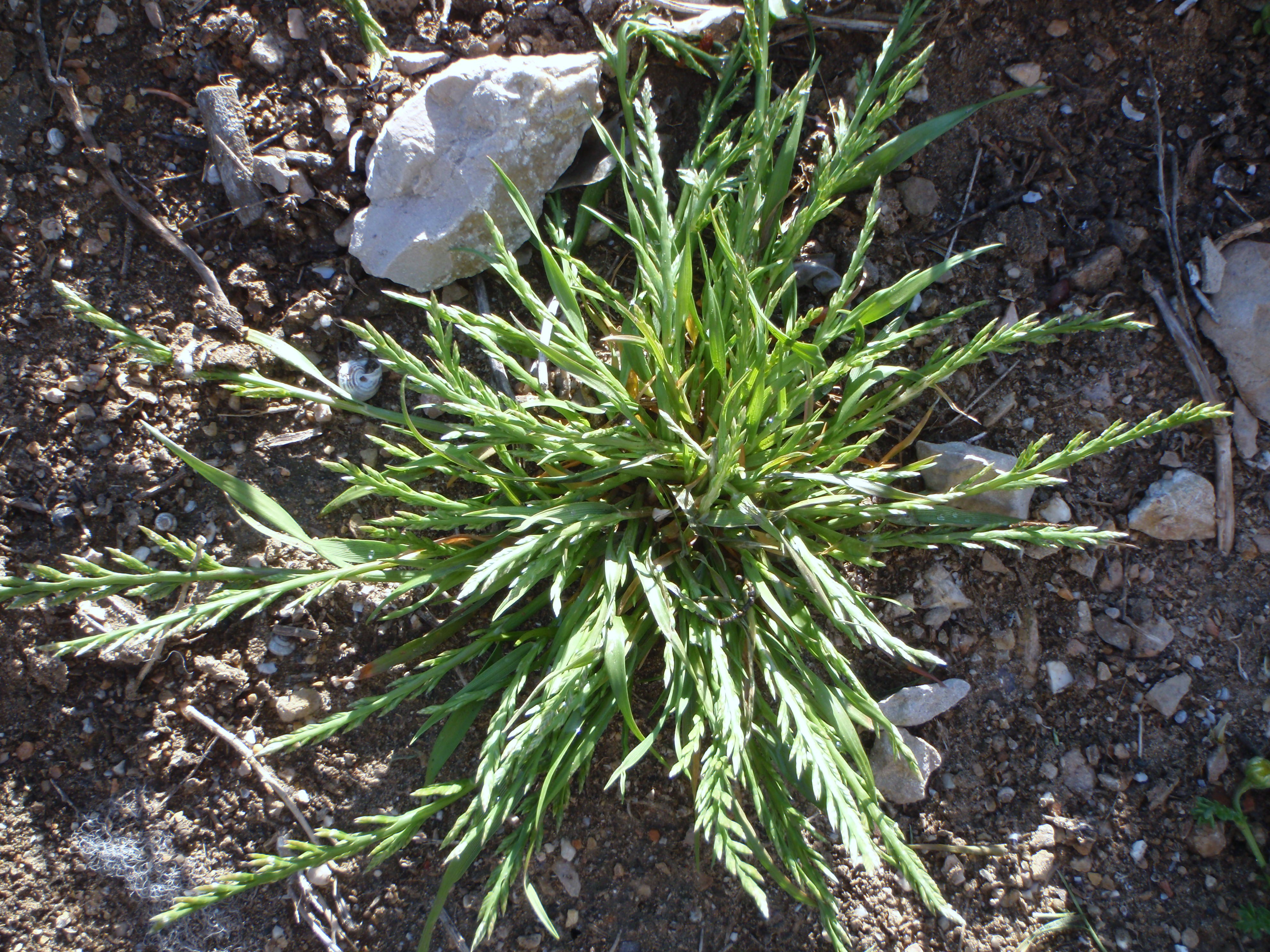
- In Marseille

Scientific classification
- Kingdom: Plantae
- Clade: Tracheophytes
- Clade: Angiosperms
- Clade: Monocots
- Clade: Commelinids
- Order: Poales
- Family: Poaceae
- Subfamily: Pooideae
- Genus: Catapodium
- Species: C. marinum

Binomial name
- Catapodium marinum (L.) C.E.Hubb.

Synonyms
- List: Desmazeria marina (L.) Druce; Festuca marina L.; Brachypodium rottboella (DC.) P.Beauv.; Bromus loliaceus (Huds.) Ten.; Catapodium loliaceum (Huds.) Link; Desmazeria loliacea (Huds.) Nyman; Festuca rottboella (DC.) Raspail; Festuca rottboellioides Kunth; Festuca tenoreana Steud.; Poa loliacea Huds.; Sclerochloa loliacea (Huds.) J.Woods; Scleropoa loliacea (Huds.) Godr. & Gren.; Triticum loliaceum (Huds.) Sm.; Triticum rottboella DC.

= Catapodium marinum =

Species of plant

Catapodium marinum, the sea fern grass, is a species of annual herb in the family Poaceae (True grasses). It has a self-supporting growth form and simple, broad leaves. Individuals can grow to 22 cm tall. Catapodium marinum is native to areas of Europe, Western Asia and North Africa.

== Sources ==
This article incorporates text from a free content work. Licensed under CC0 (license statement/permission). Text taken from Catapodium marinum. Encyclopedia of Life.
