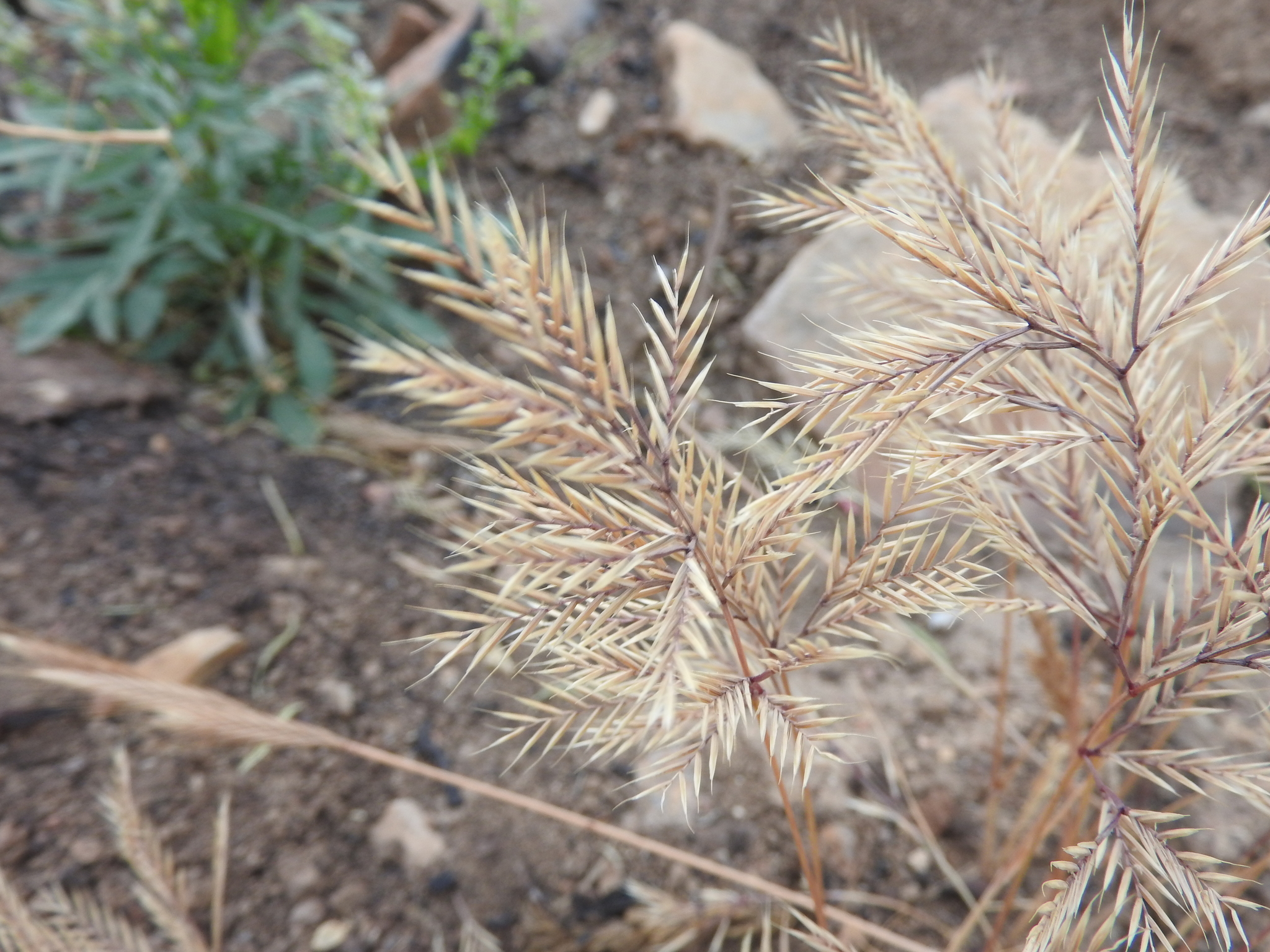
- Vulpiella stipoides in Algeria

Scientific classification
- Kingdom: Plantae
- Clade: Tracheophytes
- Clade: Angiosperms
- Clade: Monocots
- Clade: Commelinids
- Order: Poales
- Family: Poaceae
- Subfamily: Pooideae
- Supertribe: Poodae
- Tribe: Poeae
- Subtribe: Parapholiinae
- Genus: Vulpiella (Batt. & Trab.) Burollet
- Species: V. stipoides

Binomial name
- Vulpiella stipoides (L.) Maire

Synonyms
- Cutandia subgen. Vulpiella Batt. & Trab.; Bromus stipoides L.; Festuca clavata Moench; Festuca stipoides (L.) Desf.; Vulpia stipoides (L.) Dumort.; Bromus tenuis Tineo; Brachypodium tenue (Tineo) Tineo; Bromus sabulosus Guss.; Bromus sardous Spreng.; Festuca incrassata Salzm. ex Loisel.; Vulpia incrassata Parl.; Vulpia tenuis (Tineo) Parl.; Loretia tenuis (Tineo) Hack. ex Willk.; Cutandia incrassata (Parl.) Trab.; Festuca letourneuxii Asch. ex E.A.Durand & Barratte; Vulpia letourneuxii Asch. ex E.A.Durand & Barratte; Vulpiella incrassata (Parl.) Andr.; Vulpiella tenuis (Tineo) Kerguélen

= Vulpiella =

Genus of grasses

Vulpiella is a genus of plants in the grass family. The only known species is Vulpiella stipoides, native to the western Mediterranean region (Algeria, Morocco, Tunisia, Libya, Italy, France, Spain Portugal; including islands of Sardinia, Corsica, Sicily, and the Baleares).

The type species is Cutandia incrassata (Salzm. ex Lois.) Batt. & Trab.
