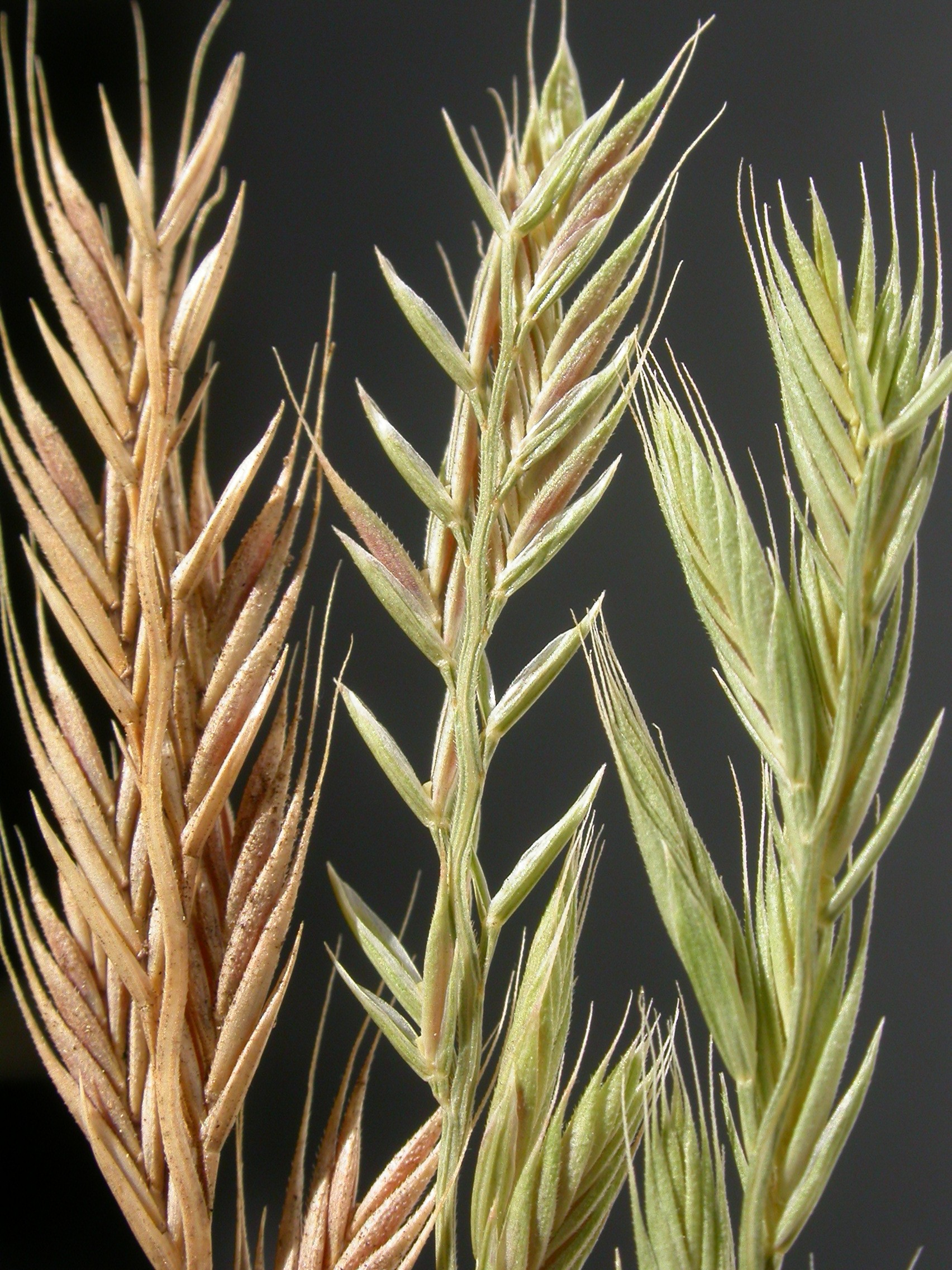

Scientific classification
- Kingdom: Plantae
- Clade: Tracheophytes
- Clade: Angiosperms
- Clade: Monocots
- Clade: Commelinids
- Order: Poales
- Family: Poaceae
- Subfamily: Pooideae
- Genus: Festuca
- Species: F. octoflora

Binomial name
- Festuca octoflora Walter

Synonyms
- Vulpia octoflora (Walter) Rydb.

= Festuca octoflora =

Species of flowering plant

Festuca octoflora, also known as Vulpia octoflora, is an annual plant in the grass family (Poaceae). The common name six-week fescue is because it supplies about 6 weeks of cattle forage after a rain. Other common names include sixweeks fescue, six-weeks fescue, pullout grass, eight-flower six-weeks grass, or eight-flowered fescue.

== Range and habitat ==
This bunchgrass is native to North America occurring across a large part of Canada, in all of the lower 48 contiguous United States, and Baja California of Mexico. It grows in open, sunny places between shrubs and in burn areas. It is commonly found in burn areas after a fire.

== Varieties ==
Festuca octoflora/Vulpia octoflora varieties include:

- Vulpia octoflora var. glauca (AKA Festuca octoflora Walter var. tenella, Festuca gracilenta Buckley, Festuca tenella Willd., and Vulpia octoflora var. tenella)
- Vulpia octoflora var. hirtella
- Vulpia octoflora var. octoflora
