= Castellia =

Scientific classification
- Kingdom: Plantae
- Clade: Tracheophytes
- Clade: Angiosperms
- Clade: Monocots
- Clade: Commelinids
- Order: Poales
- Family: Poaceae
- Subfamily: Pooideae
- Supertribe: Poodae
- Tribe: Poeae
- Subtribe: Loliinae
- Genus: Castellia; Tineo
- Species: C. tuberculosa

Binomial name
- Castellia tuberculosa (Moris) Bor

Synonyms
- Catapodium sect. Castellia (Tineo) Batt. & Trab.; Catapodium subg. Castellia (Tineo) Trab.; Desmazeria sect. Castellia (Tineo) Bonnet & Barratte; Festuca sect. Castellia (Tineo) F. Herm.; Catapodium tuberculosum Moris; Castellia tuberculata Tineo; Festuca tuberculosa (Moris) Coss. & Durieu; Desmazeria tuberculosa (Moris) Batt. & Trab. 1884; Nardurus tuberculosus (Moris) Hayek; Micropyrum tuberculosum (Moris) Pilg.; Festuca muricata Durieu ex Parl.; Lolium elegans Steud.

Genus of grasses

Castellia is a genus of African and Eurasian plants in the grass family. The only known species is Castellia tuberculosa, native to southern Europe (Spain, Sardinia, Greece), northern and northeastern Africa (Algeria, Libya, Morocco, Tunisia, Djibouti, Eritrea, Somalia, Sudan), and southwestern Asia (Saudi Arabia, Oman, Persian Gulf Sheikdoms, Iran, Pakistan, Punjab State of India).

== See also ==
- List of Poaceae genera
