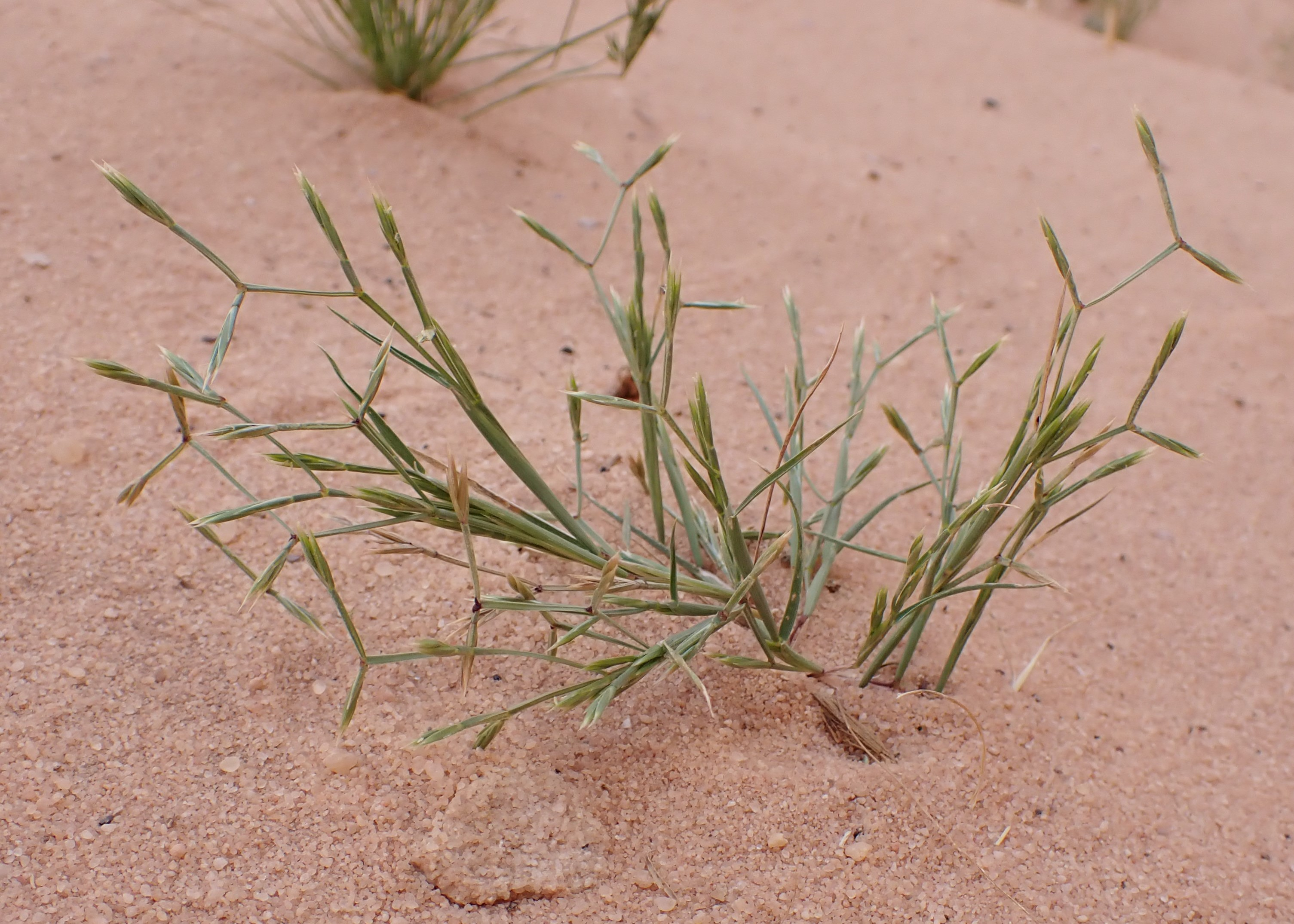
- C. Memphitica

Scientific classification
- Kingdom: Plantae
- Clade: Tracheophytes
- Clade: Angiosperms
- Clade: Monocots
- Clade: Commelinids
- Order: Poales
- Family: Poaceae
- Subfamily: Pooideae
- Supertribe: Poodae
- Tribe: Poeae
- Subtribe: Parapholiinae
- Genus: Cutandia; Willk.

Type species
- Cutandia scleropoides Willk.

Synonyms
- Festuca sect. Cutandia (Willk.) Asch. & Graebn.; Scleropoa sect. Cutandia (Willk.) Bonnet & Barratte; Scleropoa subg. Cutandia (Willk.) Rouy

= Cutandia =

Genus of grasses

Cutandia is a genus of Asian and Mediterranean plant in the grass family. It grows from Portugal and Cape Verde to Pakistan and Kazakhstan.

Species

- Cutandia dichotoma (Forssk.) Trab. - Asia + Africa from Algeria to Iran
- Cutandia divaricata (Desf.) Benth. - Canary Islands, Spain, Italy (incl Sicily + Sardinia), Morocco, Algeria, Tunisia, Libya
- Cutandia maritima (L.) Benth. - Mediterranean, Canary Islands
- Cutandia memphitica (Spreng.) Benth. - Spain, North Africa, Canary Islands, Cape Verde, Middle East, Caucasus, Arabian Peninsula, Iran, Pakistan, Afghanistan, Central Asia
- Cutandia rigescens (Grossh.) Tzvelev - Caucasus, iran, Kazakhstan, Uzbekistan
- Cutandia stenostachya (Boiss.) Stace - Greece + Turkey including Aegean Islands

Former species

See Desmazeria and Vulpiella

- Cutandia incrassata - Vulpiella stipoides
- Cutandia philistaea - Desmazeria philistaea
- Cutandia rohlfsiana - Desmazeria philistaea
