= Karl Christian Gmelin =

German botanist (1762–1837)

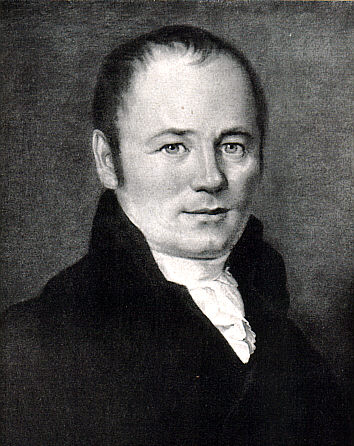
Karl Christian Gmelin

Karl (Carl) Christian Gmelin (18 March 1762, in Badenweiler – 26 June 1837, in Karlsruhe) was a German botanist. He was the brother of engraver Wilhelm Friedrich Gmelin (1760–1820).

He studied medicine and natural sciences at the universities of Strasbourg and Erlangen, receiving his doctorate at the latter school in 1784. Following graduation, he worked as teacher of natural history at the high school in Karlsruhe, a post he maintained for the next 50 years. Among his better known students was future botanist Alexander Braun. In Karlsruhe he also served as director of the botanical garden and was in charge of the margravial natural history collection.

He was the author of the three-volume Flora Badensis Alsatica (1805–08). Some plants with the specific epithet of gmelinii commemorate his name.
