= List of endemic plants of Sardinia =

Sardinia (Sardegna) is a large island in the Mediterranean Sea, and is home to dozens of endemic species and subspecies of plants. Although it is politically part of Italy, the World Geographical Scheme for Recording Plant Distributions treats Sardinia as distinct botanical country.

Plants are listed alphabetically by plant family. Extinct and presumed extinct species are indicated with †.

== Amaryllidaceae ==
- Narcissus supramontanus Arrigoni

== Apiaceae ==
- Ferula arrigonii Bocchieri
- Oenanthe lisae Moris
- Ptychotis sardoa Pignatti & Metlesics
- Siler montanum subsp. corrasianum Bacch.
- Siler montanum subsp. ogliastrinum Bacch.

== Apocynaceae ==
- Vinca difformis subsp. sardoa Stearn

== Asparagaceae ==
- Drimia glaucophylla (Bacch., Brullo, D'Emerico, Pontec. & Salmeri) Raus – southwestern Sardinia

== Asteraceae ==
- Bellium crassifolium Moris
- Buphthalmum inuloides Moris – northern Sardinia
- Castroviejoa montelinasana (Em.Schmid) Galbany, L.Sáez & Benedí
- Centaurea filiformis Viv.
  - Centaurea filiformis subsp. ferulacea (Martelli) Arrigoni – eastern Sardinia (Baunei)
  - Centaurea filiformis subsp. filiformis
- Centaurea horrida Badarò – Sardinia (T. Asinara, I. Tavolara)
- Centaurea magistrorum Arrigoni & Camarda
- Gelasia callosa (Moris) Zaika, Sukhor. & N.Kilian
- Helichrysum saxatile Moris
  - Helichrysum saxatile subsp. morisianum Bacch., Brullo & Mossa
  - Helichrysum saxatile subsp. saxatile
- Hieracium bernardi subsp. gallurense (Arrigoni) Greuter
- Hieracium bernardi subsp. templare (Arrigoni) Greuter
- Hieracium hypochoeroides subsp. supramontanum (Arrigoni) Greuter
- Hieracium leiopogon subsp. iolai (Arrigoni) Greuter
- Hieracium mattiroloanum subsp. martellianum (Zahn) Greuter
- Hieracium pictum subsp. irginianum (Arrigoni) Greuter
- Hieracium racemosum subsp. limbarae (Arrigoni) Greuter
- Hieracium racemosum subsp. oliastrae (Arrigoni) Greuter
- Hypochaeris sardoa Bacch., Brullo & Terrasi
- Lactuca longidentata Moris ex DC.
- Lamyropsis microcephala (Moris) Dittrich & Greuter
- Phagnalon rupestre subsp. morisianum (Ces., Pass. & Gibelli) Arcang.
- Senecio marmorae Moris
- Senecio morisii J.Calvo & Bacch. – central-eastern Sardinia
- Senecio sardous (Greuter) Arrigoni
- Senecio × vaccarii Fiori (S. leucanthemifolius × S. vulgaris)
- Taraxacum barbaricinum Arrigoni
- Taraxacum genargenteum Arrigoni
- Taraxacum sarcidanum Arrigoni
- Taraxacum sardomontanum Arrigoni

== Boraginaceae ==
- Anchusa crispa subsp. maritima (Vals.) Selvi & Bigazzi – northern Sardinia
- Anchusa formosa Selvi, Bigazzi & Bacch.
- Anchusa montelinasana Angius, Pontec. & Selvi
- Borago morisiana Bigazzi & Ricceri – Sardinia incl. I. S. Pietro
- Cynoglossum barbaricinum Arrigoni & Selvi
- Echium anchusoides Bacch.

== Brassicaceae ==
- Brassica tyrrhena Giotta, Piccitto & Arrigoni
- Odontarrhena tavolarae (Briq.) L.Cecchi & Selvi

== Campanulaceae ==
- Campanula forsythii (Arcang.) Bég.
- Solenopsis bacchettae Brullo – central Sardinia

== Caprifoliaceae ==
- Cephalaria squamiflora subsp. bigazzii (Bacch., Brullo & Giusso) Domina
- Cephalaria squamiflora subsp. mediterranea (Viv.) Pignatti
- Dipsacus valsecchii Camarda
- Valeriana amazonum (Fridl. & A.Raynal) Christenh. & Byng – eastern Sardinia

== Caryophyllaceae ==
- Cerastium ligusticum subsp. palustre (Moris) P.D.Sell & Whitehead
- Cerastium supramontanum Arrigoni
- Dianthus genargenteus Bacch., Brullo, Casti & Giusso
- Dianthus ichnusae Bacch., Brullo, Casti & Giusso
  - Dianthus ichnusae subsp. ichnusae
  - Dianthus ichnusae subsp. toddei Bacch., Brullo, Casti & Giusso
- Dianthus insularis Bacch., Brullo, Casti & Giusso
- Dianthus morisianus Vals. – southwestern Sardinia
- Dianthus mossanus Bacch. & Brullo – southern Sardinia
- Dianthus oliastrae Bacch., Brullo, Casti & Giusso
- Dianthus sardous Bacch., Brullo, Casti & Giusso
- Dianthus stellaris Camarda
- Sagina revelierei Jord. & Fourr.
- Saponaria ocymoides subsp. alsinoides (Viv.) Arcang.
- Silene beguinotii Vals.
- Silene ichnusae Brullo, De Marco & De Marco f.
- Silene morisiana Bég. & Ravenel
- Silene rosulata subsp. sanctae-therasiae (Jeanm.) Jeanm. – northern Sardinia
- Silene valsecchiae Bocchieri – northeastern and southeastern Sardinia

== Cistaceae ==
- Helianthemum morisianum Bertol.
- Helianthemum supramontanum Arrigoni

== Colchicaceae ==
- Colchicum actupii Fridl. – east-central Sardinia
- Colchicum gonarei Camarda

== Fabaceae ==
- Anthyllis hermanniae subsp. ichnusae Brullo & Giusso – east-central Sardinia
- Astragalus genargenteus Moris – central Sardinia
- Astragalus gennarii Bacch. & Brullo – Monte Albo
- Astragalus maritimus Moris – I. San Pietro
- Astragalus tegulensis Bacch. & Brullo
- Astragalus verrucosus Moris
- Bituminaria morisiana (Pignatti & Metlesics) Greuter
- Genista arbusensis Vals.
- Genista bocchierii Bacch. Brullo & Feoli Chiapella
- Genista cadasonensis Vals.
- Genista desoleana subsp. martellii Bacch., Brullo & Giusso – western Sardinia
- Genista ephedroides DC. – northeastern Sardinia
- Genista insularis Bacch., Brullo & Feoli Chiapella
  - Genista insularis subsp. fodinae Bacch., Brullo & Feoli Chiapella
  - Genista insularis subsp. insularis
- Genista morisii Colla
- Genista nuragica Bacch., Brullo & Giusso
- Genista ovina Bacch., Brullo & Feoli Chiapella
- Genista pichisermolliana Vals. – east-central Sardinia
- Genista salzmannii subsp. limbarae Bacch., Brullo & Giusso
- Genista sardoa Vals.
- Genista sulcitana Vals.
- Genista toluensis Vals.
- Genista valsecchiae Brullo & De Marco – southwestern Sardinia

== Fagaceae ==
- Quercus ichnusae Mossa, Bacch. & Brullo

== Grossulariaceae ==
- Ribes multiflorum subsp. sandalioticum Arrigoni
- Ribes sardoum Martelli – Sardinia, near Oliena

== Hypericaceae ==
- Hypericum scruglii Bacch., Brullo & Salmeri

== Iridaceae ==
- Romulea bocchierii Frignani & Iiriti
- Romulea × limbarae Bég. (R. ligustica × R. requienii)

== Lamiaceae ==
- Clinopodium sandalioticum (Bacch. & Brullo) Bacch. & Brullo ex Peruzzi & F.Conti – southwestern Sardinia
- Clinopodium sardoum (Asch. & Levier) Peruzzi & F.Conti
- Glechoma sardoa (Bég.) Bég.
- Micromeria filiformis subsp. cordata (Moris) Pignatti
- Nepeta foliosa Moris – Mt. Oliena
- Salvia desoleana Atzei & V.Picci
- Thymus catharinae Camarda

== Malvaceae ==
- Malva lusitanica subsp. pallescens (Moris) Valdés – islands off San Pietro
- Malva stenopetala subsp. plazzae (Atzei) Iamonico

== Orchidaceae ==
- Anacamptis × alata nothosubsp. sarcidani (Scrugli & M.P.Grasso) H.Kretzschmar, Eccarius & H.Dietr. (A. laxiflora × A. morio subsp. longicornu)
- × Anacamptorchis richardiorum (Soca) J.M.H.Shaw (Anacamptis papilionacea × Orchis mascula subsp. ichnusae)
- Ophrys × barbaricina M.Allard & M.P.Grasso (O. holosericea × O. speculum × O. sphegodes)
- Ophrys × domus-maria M.P.Grasso (O. apifera × O. holosericea × O. sphegodes)
- Ophrys holosericea subsp. chestermanii J.J.Wood
- Ophrys × luisae (Licheri & Napoli) Soca (O. argolica subsp. crabronifera × O. bombyliflora × O. sphegodes)
- Ophrys × maremmae nothosubsp. normanii (J.J.Wood) H.Baumann & Künkele (O. holosericea subsp. chestermanii × O. tenthredinifera) – southwestern Sardinia
- Ophrys × marganaiensis Licheri & Rodi (O. argolica subsp. crabronifera × O. sphegodes × O. tenthredinifera)
- Ophrys × minuticauda nothosubsp. donorensis Gulli & M.P.Grasso (O. apifera × O. scolopax subsp. conradiae)
- Ophrys × pardui Giotta & Piccitto (O. fusca subsp. iricolor × O. holosericea × O. sphegodes)
- Ophrys × sulcitana Scrugli, Todde & Cogoni (O. holosericea × O. bombyliflora)
- Ophrys × vicina nothosubsp. corriasiana H.Baumann, Giotta, Künkele, R.Lorenz & Piccitto (O. holosericea subsp. chestermanii × O. scolopax subsp. conradiae) – southwestern Sardinia
- Orchis × penzigiana nothosubsp. sardoa Scrugli & M.P.Grasso (O. mascula subsp. ichnusae × O. provincialis)

== Orobanchaceae ==
- Orobanche denudata Moris

== Paeoniaceae ==
- Paeonia sandrae Camarda – northwestern Sardinia

== Plantaginaceae ==
- Cymbalaria muelleri (Moris) A.Chev. – central Sardinia
  - Cymbalaria muelleri subsp. muelleri – central Sardinia
  - Cymbalaria muelleri subsp. villosa Carnicero – central-eastern Sardinia
- Linaria arcusangeli Atzei & Camarda

== Plumbaginaceae ==
- Armeria morisii Boiss.
- Armeria sardoa Spreng.
- Armeria sulcitana Arrigoni
- Limonium acutifolium subsp. bosanum (Arrigoni & Diana) Arrigoni
- Limonium acutifolium subsp. cornusianum (Arrigoni & Diana) Arrigoni
- Limonium acutifolium subsp. nymphaeum (Erben) Arrigoni
- Limonium acutifolium subsp. tenuifolium (Bertol. ex Moris) Arrigoni – western Sardinia
- Limonium acutifolium subsp. tharrosianum (Arrigoni & Diana) Arrigoni
- Limonium ampuriense Arrigoni & Diana
- Limonium capitis-eliae Erben – southern Sardinia (Sant'Elia)
- Limonium capitis-marci Arrigoni & Diana
- Limonium caralitanum Erben
- Limonium carisae Erben
- Limonium coralliforme Alf.Mayer
- Limonium cunicularium Arrigoni & Diana
- Limonium × dolcheri Pignatti (L. articulatum × L. graecum subsp. divaricatum)
- Limonium gallurense Arrigoni & Diana
- Limonium hermaeum Pignatti – northeastern Sardinia (I. Tavolara)
- Limonium insulare (Bég. & Landi) Arrigoni & Diana
- Limonium laetum (Nyman) Pignatti – western Sardinia
- Limonium lausianum Pignatti – western Sardinia (near Oristano)
- Limonium malfatanicum Erben
- Limonium merxmuelleri Erben
- Limonium morisianum Arrigoni
- Limonium multifurcatum Erben – northwestern Sardinia
- Limonium oristanum Alf.Mayer
- Limonium protohermaeum Arrigoni & Diana
- Limonium pseudolaetum Arrigoni & Diana
- Limonium pulviniforme Arrigoni & Diana
- Limonium racemosum (Lojac.) Diana
- Limonium retirameum Greuter & Burdet
- Limonium sardoum (Pignatti) Erben – southern Sardinia (Sant'Elia)
- Limonium sinisicum Erben
- Limonium strictissimum (Salzm.) Arrigoni – northern Sardinia
- Limonium sulcitanum Arrigoni
- Limonium tibulatium Pignatti
- Limonium tigulianum Arrigoni & Diana
- Limonium tyrrhenicum Arrigoni & Diana
- Limonium ursanum Erben
- Limonium viniolae Arrigoni & Diana

== Poaceae ==
- Festuca morisiana subsp. morisiana – central Sardinia (Mt. Gennargetu)

== Polygalaceae ==
- Polygala padulae Arrigoni
- Polygala sardoa Chodat
- Polygala sinisica Arrigoni

== Ranunculaceae ==
- Aquilegia barbaricina Arrigoni & E.Nardi – east-central Sardinia
- Aquilegia cremnophila Bacch., Brullo, Congiu, Fenu, J.L.Garrido & Mattana
- Aquilegia nugorensis Arrigoni & E.Nardi – east-central Sardinia
- Aquilegia nuragica Arrigoni & E.Nardi – east-central Sardinia
- Ranunculus cymbalariifolius Balb. ex Moris

== Rhamnaceae ==
- Rhamnus persicifolia Moris

== Rosaceae ==
- Rubus laconensis Camarda
- Rubus pignattii Camarda

== Rubiaceae ==
- Cynanchica deficiens (Viv.) P.Caputo & Del Guacchio – I. Tavolara
- Cynanchica pumila (Moris) P.Caputo & Del Guacchio – near Oliena
- Galium glaucophyllum Em.Schmid
- Galium schmidii Arrigoni

== Rutaceae ==
- Ruta lamarmorae Bacch.

== Salicaceae ==
- Salix arrigonii Brullo
- Salix purpurea subsp. eburnea (Borzì) Cif. & Giacom. ex S.Pignatti

== Santalaceae ==
- Thesium italicum A.DC.

== Scrophulariaceae ==
- Scrophularia morisii Vals.

== Violaceae ==
- Viola limbarae (Merxm. & W.Lippert) Arrigoni
