= Giardino Montano Linasia =

Botanical garden in Italy

Coordinates: 39°19′N 8°32′E

The Giardino Montano Linasia (9,000 m^{2}) is a nature preserve and botanical garden located at 720 meters altitude near Monte Linas in San Benedetto, Iglesias, Province of Carbonia-Iglesias, Sardinia, Italy. Opening days depend on the time of year; an admission fee is charged.

The garden was established in 1989 by the Ente Foreste della Sardegna, and realized in 1992 in collaboration with the Istituto di Botanica dell'Università di Cagliari. It is organized into four major sections as follows: open areas; wooded areas; riparian vegetation; and endemic plant collection. Plants are labeled with scientific names and geographic origins.

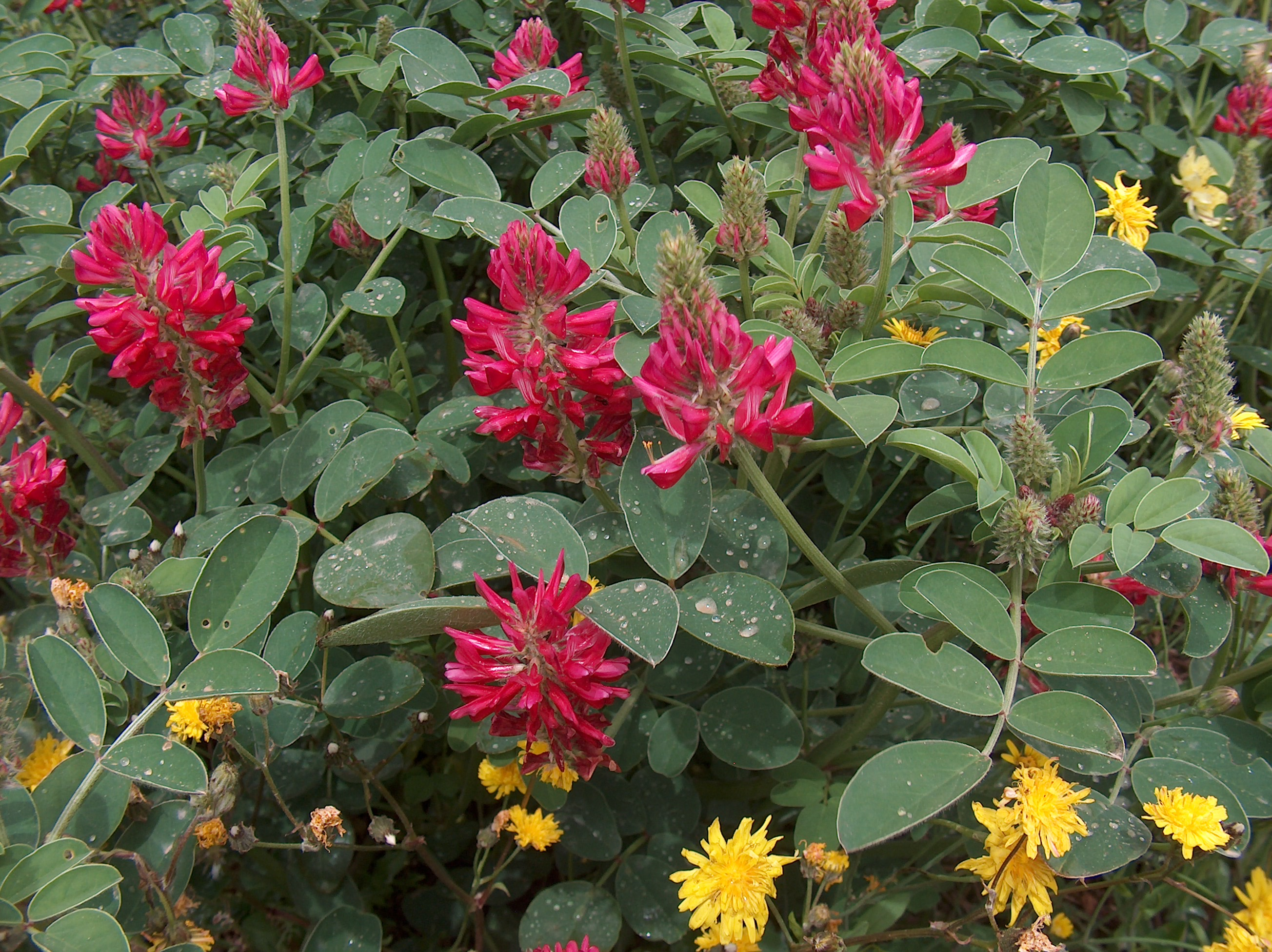
Giardino Montano Linasia

== Species ==
The garden contains roughly 60 species of endemic plants, as well as some 20 species of nonnative introductions.

Endemic species include:

- Allium parciflorum
- Aquilegia nugorensis
- Arenaria balearica
- Armeria sulcitana
- Arum pictum
- Barbarea rupicola
- Bellium bellidioides
- Bellium crassifolium
- Borago pygmaea
- Bryonia marmorata
- Carlina macrocephala
- Centaurea filiformis
- Crocus minimus
- Cymbalaria aequitriloba
- Delphinium pictum
- Euphorbia cupanii
- Euphorbia hyberna
- Galium schmidii
- Genista aetnensis
- Genista corsica
- Genista morisii
- Genista valsecchiae
- Glechoma sardoa
- Helichrysum montelinasanum
- Helleborus argutifolius
- Hypericoum hircinum
- Iberis integerrima
- Limonium merxmuelleri
- Linaria arcusangeli
- Mentha insularis
- Mentha requienii
- Morisia monantha
- Ophrys chestermanii
- Ophrys morisii
- Orchis mascula
- Ornithogalum corsicum
- Pancratium illyricum
- Plagius flosculosus
- Plantago subulata
- Polygonum scoparium
- Psoralea morisiana
- Ptilostemon casabonae
- Rhamnus persicifolius
- Ribes sandalioticum
- Salvia desoleana
- Saxifraga cervicornis
- Saxifraga corsica
- Santolina insularis
- Seseli bocconii
- Scorzonera callosa
- Scrophularia trifoliata
- Sesleria insularis
- Soleirolia soleirolii
- Stachys glutinosa
- Stachys corsica
- Teucrium subspinosum
- Thymus herba
- Vinca sardoa
- Viola corsica

== See also ==
- List of botanical gardens in Italy
