= Puerphorus =

Scientific classification
- Kingdom: Animalia
- Phylum: Arthropoda
- Class: Insecta
- Order: Lepidoptera
- Family: Pterophoridae
- Tribe: Oidaematophorini
- Genus: Puerphorus; Arenberger, 1989
- Species: P. olbiadactylus

Binomial name
- Puerphorus olbiadactylus (Millière, 1859)

Synonyms
- Pterophorus olbiadactylus Millière, 1859; Pselnophorus hemiargus Meyrick, 1908; Gypsochares leptodactyla Staudinger, 1920

Monotypic genus of plume moths

Puerphorus is a genus of moths in the family Pterophoridae containing only one species, Puerphorus olbiadactylus, which is known from Yemen, Afghanistan, Algeria, Iran, Israel, Jordan, Lebanon, Morocco, Syria, Tunisia, southern Europe and Turkey.

The larvae feed on Phagnalon rupestre, Phagnalon saxatile, Phagnalon sordidum and Phagnalon telonense.
