= Scrobipalpa phagnalella =

Scientific classification
- Domain: Eukaryota
- Kingdom: Animalia
- Phylum: Arthropoda
- Class: Insecta
- Order: Lepidoptera
- Family: Gelechiidae
- Genus: Scrobipalpa
- Species: S. phagnalella

Binomial name
- Scrobipalpa phagnalella (Constant, 1895)

Synonyms
- Lita phagnalella Constant, 1895; Lita staehelinella Caradja, 1920

Species of moth

Scrobipalpa phagnalella is a moth in the family Gelechiidae. It was described by Alexandre Constant in 1895. It is found on Corsica, Sardinia, Crete, in Portugal, Spain, southern France, Greece, Russia and Morocco.

The larvae feed on Phagnalon saxatile and Phagnalon rupestre.
