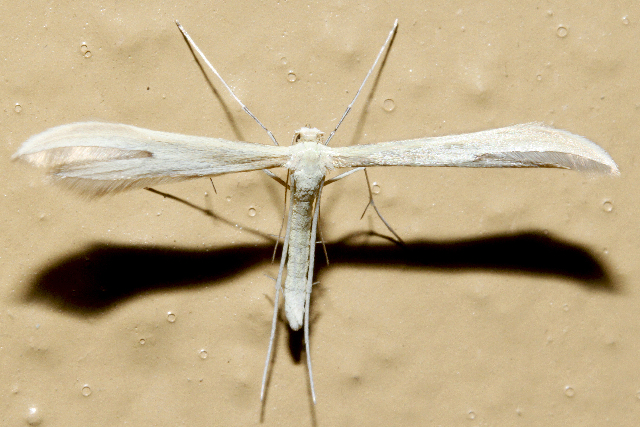

Scientific classification
- Domain: Eukaryota
- Kingdom: Animalia
- Phylum: Arthropoda
- Class: Insecta
- Order: Lepidoptera
- Family: Pterophoridae
- Genus: Hellinsia
- Species: H. pectodactylus

Binomial name
- Hellinsia pectodactylus (Staudinger, 1859)

Synonyms
- Pterophorus pectodactyla Staudinger, 1859; Hellinsia pectodactyla; Lioptilus angustus Walsingham, 1880; Lioptilus stramineus Walsingham, 1880; Pterophorus melanoschisma Walsingham, 1908

= Hellinsia pectodactylus =

Species of plume moth

Hellinsia pectodactylus is a species of moth in the family Pterophoridae. It is found in Europe (the Iberian Peninsula, France, Germany, Switzerland, Sardinia, Greece, Cyprus and southern Russia), the Canary Islands, Kyrgyzstan, Afghanistan, India and North America (including the Rocky Mountains, Oregon, Alberta, British Columbia, Ontario).

The wingspan is 19–20 mm.

The larvae feed on Solidago virgaurea, Aster linosyris and Phagnalon saxatile.
