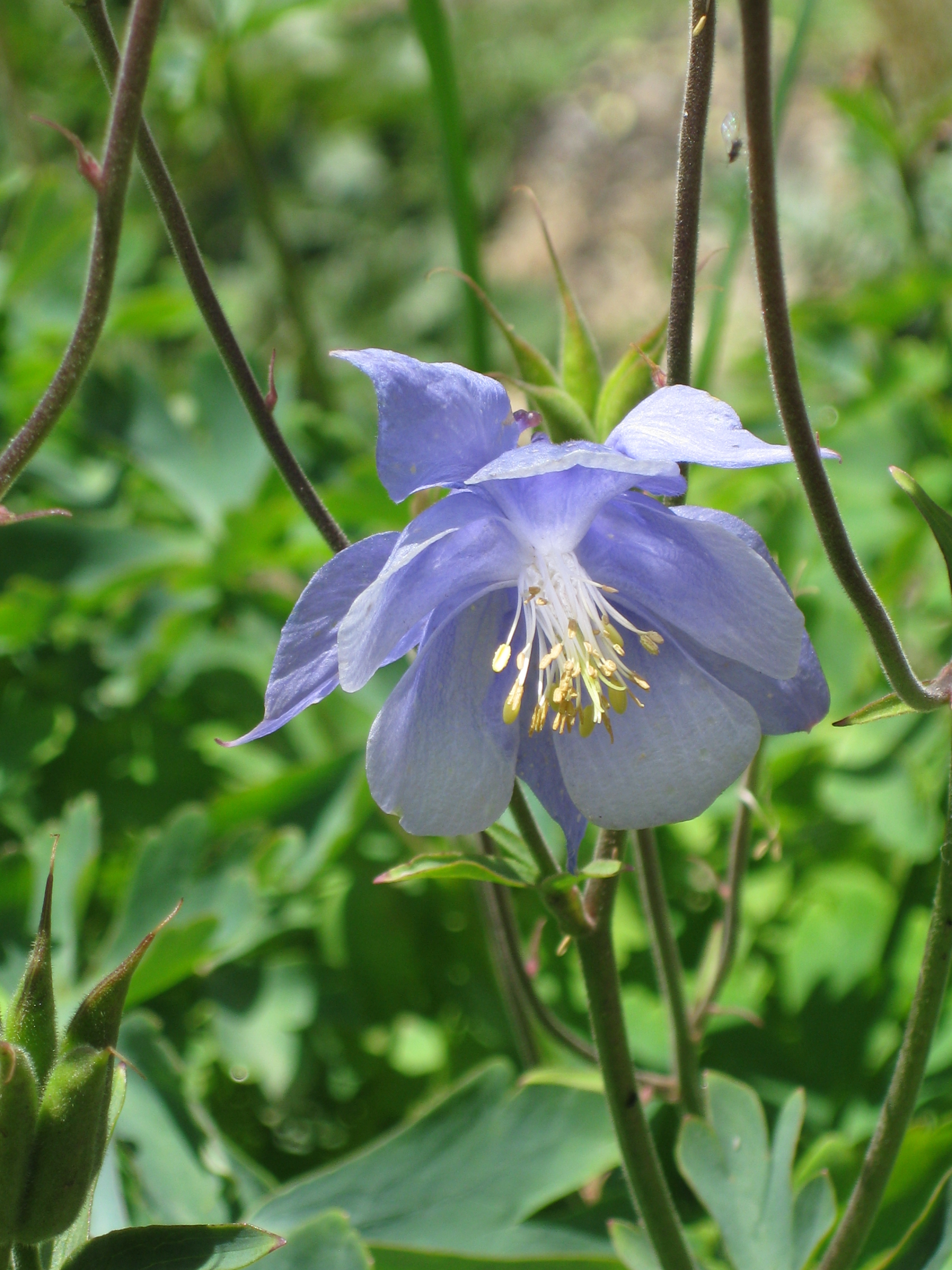
- Flower

Conservation status
- Not evaluated (IUCN 3.1)

Scientific classification
- Kingdom: Plantae
- Clade: Tracheophytes
- Clade: Angiosperms
- Clade: Eudicots
- Order: Ranunculales
- Family: Ranunculaceae
- Genus: Aquilegia
- Species: A. bernardii

Binomial name
- Aquilegia bernardii Gren. & Godr.

Synonyms
- Aquilegia alpina var. bernardii (Gren. & Godr.) Fiori & Paol.; Aquilegia vulgaris var. bernardii (Gren. & Godr.) Baker; Aquilegia corsica Soleirol ex Nyman

= Aquilegia bernardii =

Species of flowering plant

Aquilegia bernardii, common name Bernard's columbine, is a perennial species of flowering plant in the family Ranunculaceae, endemic to Corsica.

== Description ==
Bernard's columbine grows to 20–40 cm (7.9–15.7 in) tall, with pale blue flowers, relatively large leaf lobes, and short, spindly spurs.

== Taxonomy ==
The species forms a monophyletic clade with the other columbine species endemic to Corsica and Sardinia, Aquilegia barbaricina, Aquilegia litardierei, Aquilegia nugorensis and Aquilegia nuragica.

=== Etymology ===
The specific name bernardii likely honours the French plant collector Pierre Frédéric Bernard.

== Distribution and habitat ==
Aquilegia bernardii is endemic to the mountains of Corsica from Cap Corse in the north to the Montagne de Cagna massif near Levie in the south. It grows in rocky areas at altitudes of 1,000–2,600 m (3,300–8,500 ft), particularly in crevices that are in shade for part of the day. The flowering period is from July to August.

== Conservation ==
The species has not been assessed for the IUCN Red List.
