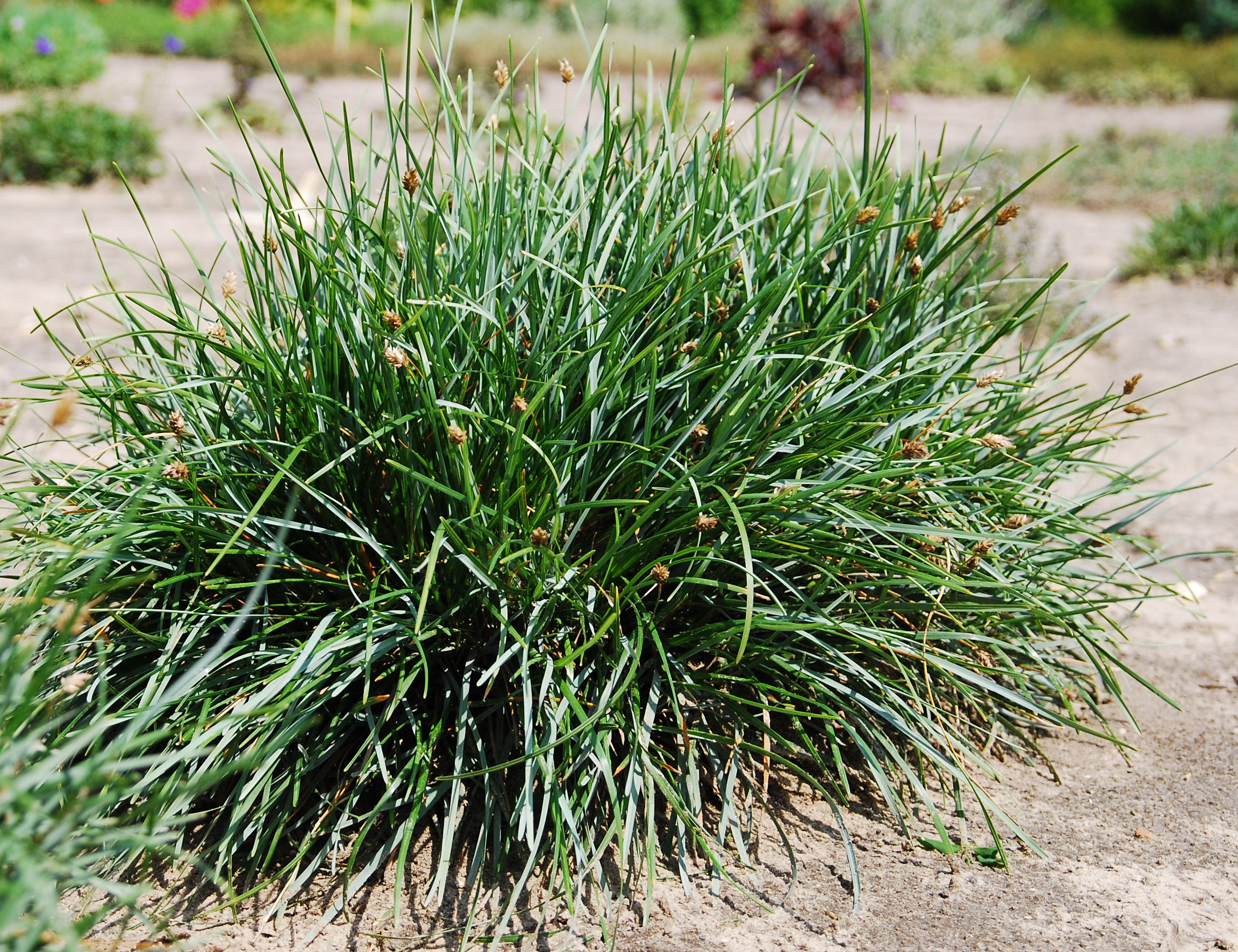
- Sesleria sadlerana

Scientific classification
- Kingdom: Plantae
- Clade: Tracheophytes
- Clade: Angiosperms
- Clade: Monocots
- Clade: Commelinids
- Order: Poales
- Family: Poaceae
- Subfamily: Pooideae
- Supertribe: Poodae
- Tribe: Poeae
- Subtribe: Sesleriinae
- Genus: Sesleria; Scop.

Type species
- Sesleria caerulea (L.) Ard.

Synonyms
- Diptychum Dulac

= Sesleria =

Genus of grasses

Sesleria is a genus of perennial plants in the grass family. They are native to Eurasia and North Africa. They are found in Albania, Austria, Baleares, Baltic States, Belarus, Belgium, Bulgaria, Corsica, Czechoslovakia, East Aegean Islands, Finland, France, Germany, Great Britain, Greece, Hungary, Iceland, Iran, Ireland, Italy, Crete, Crimea, Lebanon, Morocco, North Caucasus, Poland, Romania, Sardina, Sicilia, Spain, Sweden, Switzerland, Syria, Transcaucasus, Turkey, Ukraine and Yugoslavia.

The genus was circumscribed by Giovanni Antonio Scopoli in Fl. Carniol. on page 189 in 1760.

The genus name of Sesleria is in honour of Leonard Sesler (d. 1785), German-Italian doctor and botanist who maintained a large botanical garden.

== Species ==
Kew accepts 36 species;

- Sesleria achtarovii Deyl
- Sesleria alba Sm.
- Sesleria albanica Ujhelyi
- Sesleria albicans Kit. ex Schult.
- Sesleria araratica Kit Tan
- Sesleria argentea (Savi) Savi
- Sesleria autumnalis (Scop.) F.W.Schultz
- Sesleria bielzii Schur
- Sesleria caerulea (L.) Ard.
- Sesleria calabrica (Deyl) Di Pietro
- Sesleria coerulans Friv.
- Sesleria comosa Velen.
- Sesleria doerfleri Hayek
- Sesleria filifolia Hoppe
- Sesleria heufleriana Schur
- Sesleria insularis Sommier
- Sesleria italica (Pamp.) Ujhelyi
- Sesleria juncifolia Suffren
- Sesleria klasterskyi Deyl
- Sesleria korabensis (Kümmerle & Jáv.) Deyl
- Sesleria latifolia (Adamovic) Degen
- Sesleria nitida Ten.
- Sesleria phleoides Steven ex Roem. & Schul
- Sesleria pichiana Foggi, Gr.Rossi & Pignotti
- Sesleria rigida Heuff. ex Rchb.
- Sesleria robusta Schott, Nyman & Kotschy
- Sesleria sadleriana Janka
- Sesleria serbica (Adamovic) Ujhelyi
- Sesleria tatrae (Degen) Deyl
- Sesleria taygetea Hayek
- Sesleria tenerrima (Fritsch) Hayek
- Sesleria × tuzsonii (Ujhelyi) Ujhelyi
- Sesleria uliginosa Opiz
- Sesleria vaginalis Boiss. & Orph.
- Sesleria wettsteinii Dörfl. & Hayek

It formerly included; species now considered better suited in other genera such as: Aeluropus, Ammochloa, Bouteloua, Dactylis, Elytrophorus, Festuca, Koeleria, Oreochloa, Poa, Sclerochloa, Sesleriella, Triodia and Triraphis.

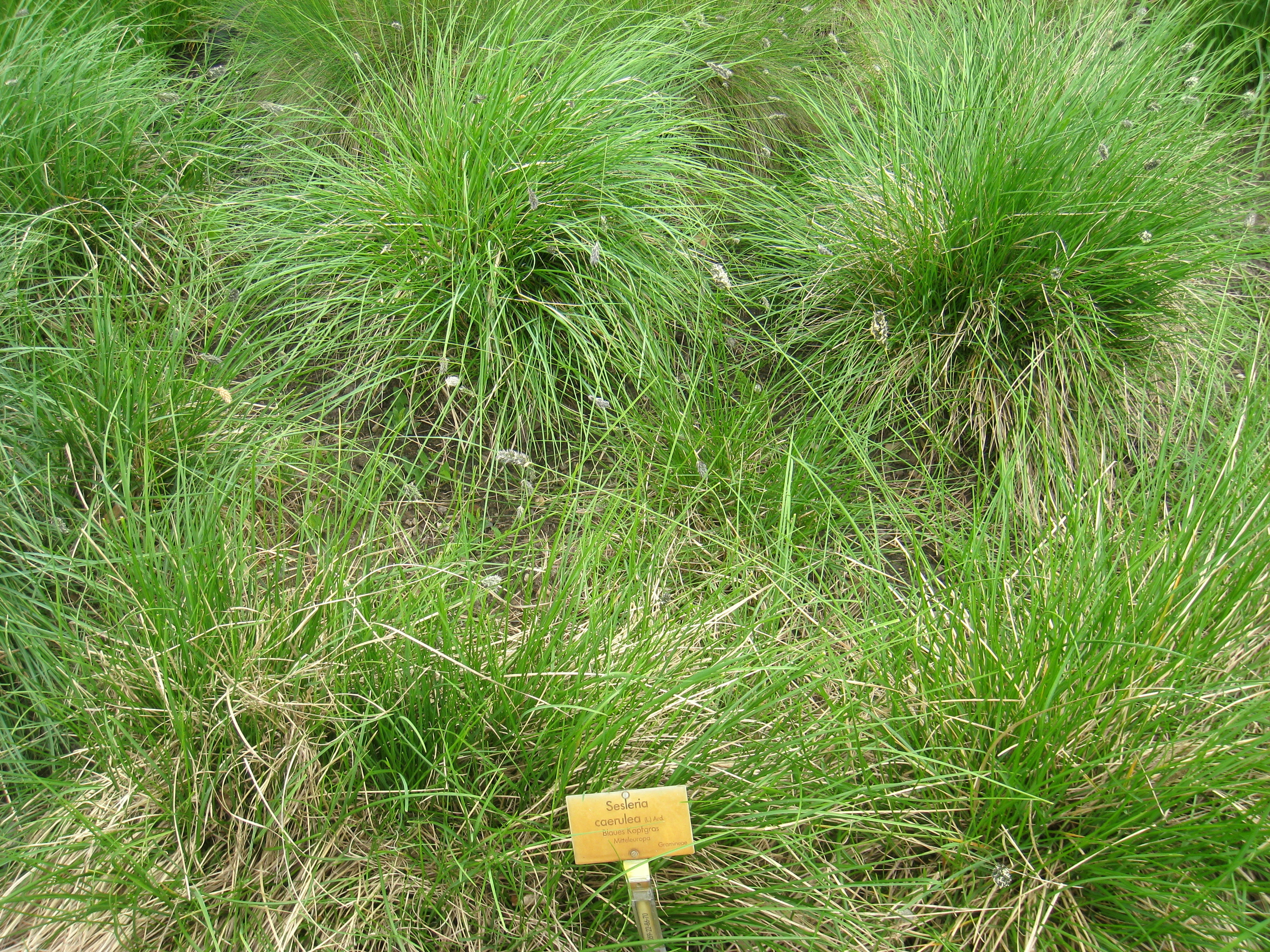
Sesleria caerulea

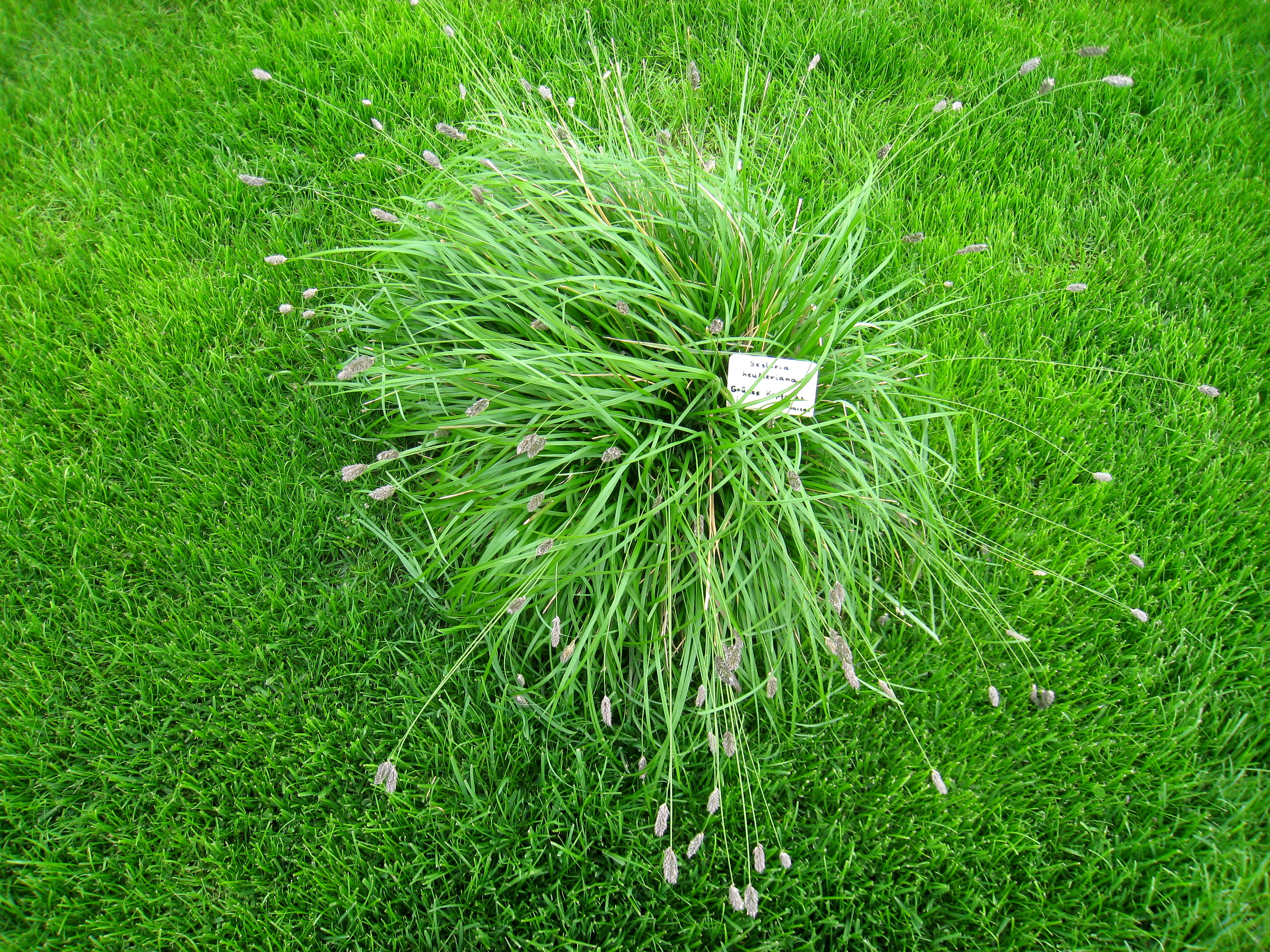
Sesleria heufleriana

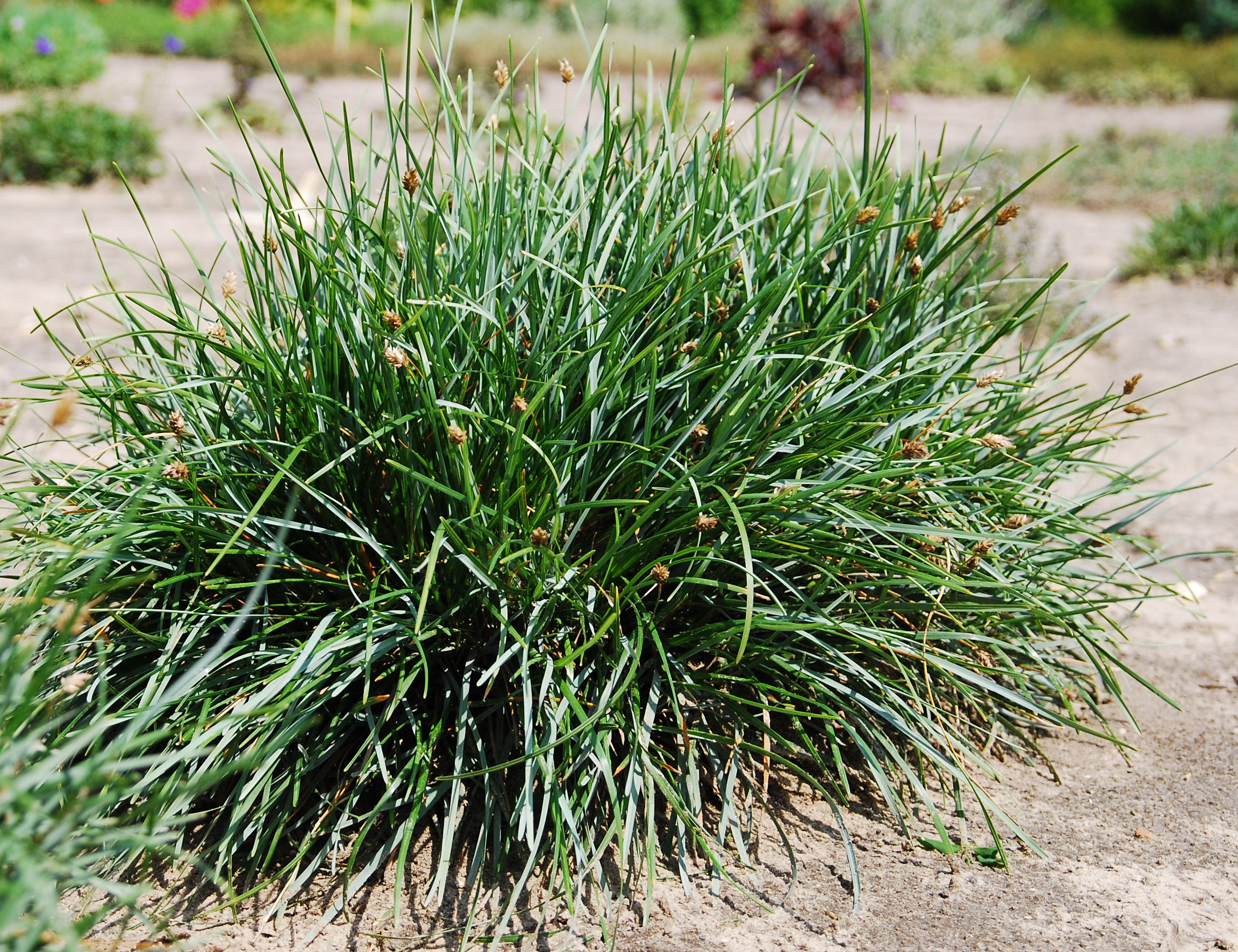
Sesleria sadlerana
