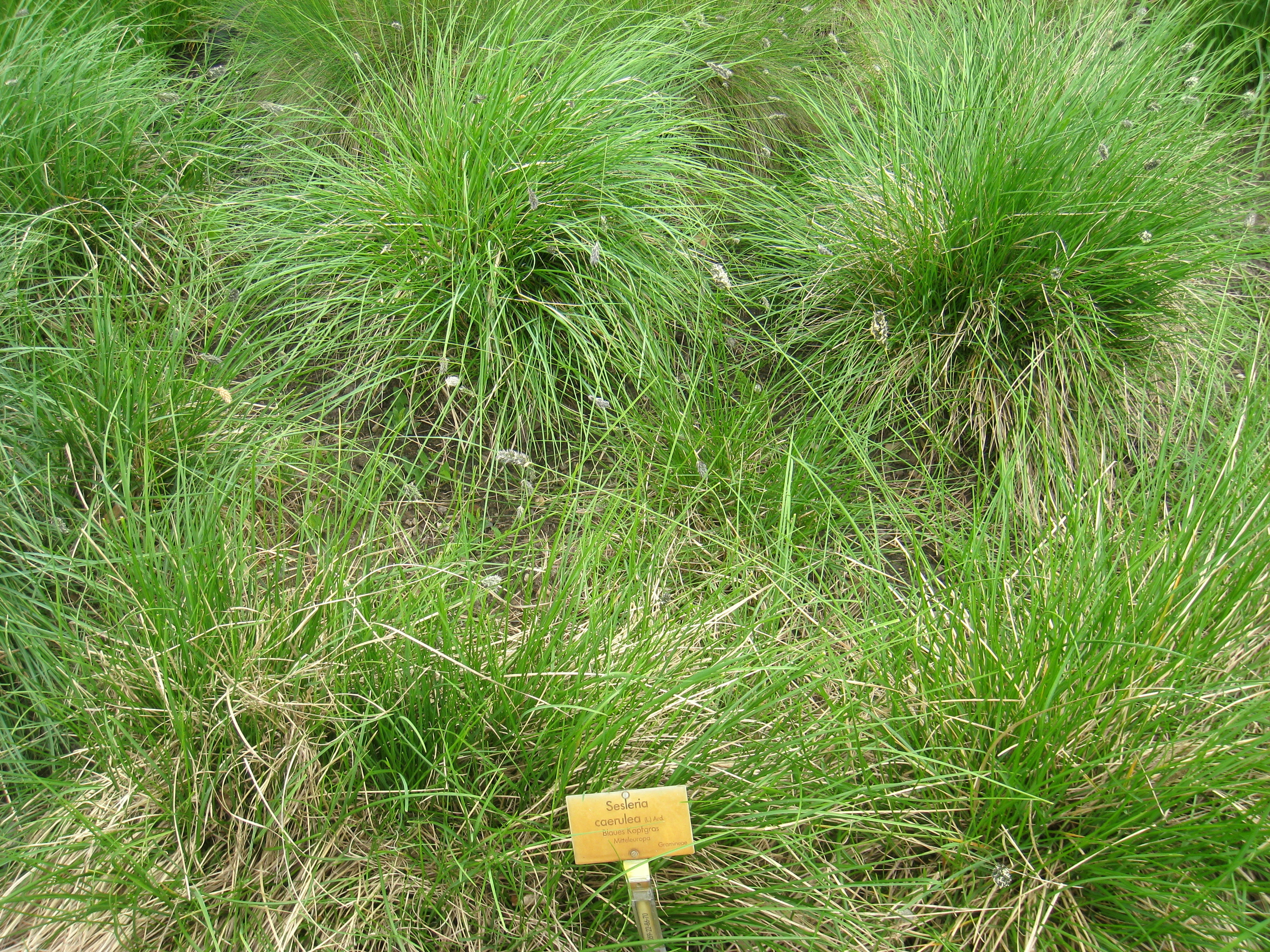

Scientific classification
- Kingdom: Plantae
- Clade: Tracheophytes
- Clade: Angiosperms
- Clade: Monocots
- Clade: Commelinids
- Order: Poales
- Family: Poaceae
- Subfamily: Pooideae
- Genus: Sesleria
- Species: S. caerulea

Binomial name
- Sesleria caerulea (L.) Ard.

= Sesleria caerulea =

Species of grass

Sesleria caerulea, the blue moor-grass, is a species of perennial grass in the family Poaceae, native to Europe.
