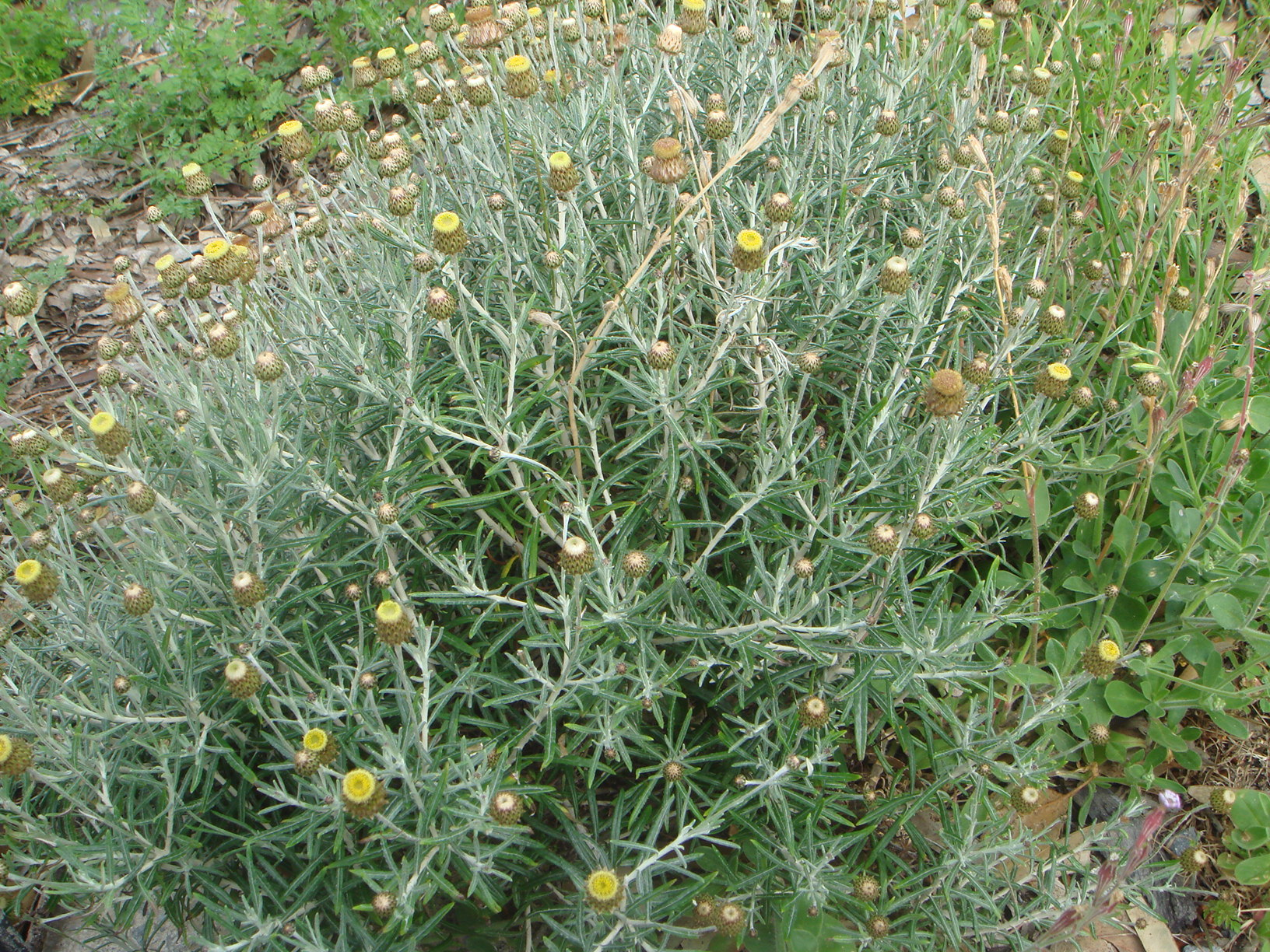
- Phagnalon saxatile

Scientific classification
- Kingdom: Plantae
- Clade: Tracheophytes
- Clade: Angiosperms
- Clade: Eudicots
- Clade: Asterids
- Order: Asterales
- Family: Asteraceae
- Subfamily: Asteroideae
- Tribe: Gnaphalieae
- Genus: Phagnalon; Cass.

Synonyms
- Gnaphalon Lowe

= Phagnalon =

Genus of flowering plants

Phagnalon is a genus of flowering plants in the family Asteraceae, native to southern Europe, North Africa and northeastern Tropical Africa, and Western Asia to the Arabian Peninsula and Tibet.

== Species ==
32 species are accepted, along with several interspecific hybrids.

- Phagnalon abyssinicum Sch.Bip. ex A.Rich.
- Phagnalon acuminatum Boiss.
- Phagnalon barbeyanum Asch. & Schweinf.
- Phagnalon bicolor Ball
- Phagnalon calycinum (Cav.) DC.
- Phagnalon × caroli Pau
- Phagnalon darvazicum Krasch.
- Phagnalon × domingoi Sennen
- Phagnalon garamantum Maire
- Phagnalon graecum Boiss. & Heldr.
- Phagnalon harazianum Deflers
- Phagnalon kotschyi Sch.Bip. ex Boiss.
- Phagnalon lavranosii Qaiser & Lack
- Phagnalon linifolium Post
- Phagnalon melanoleucum Webb
- Phagnalon nitidum Fresen.
- Phagnalon niveum Edgew.
- Phagnalon × paschale Sennen
- Phagnalon persicum Boiss.
- Phagnalon phagnaloides (A.Rich.) Cufod.
- Phagnalon purpurascens Sch.Bip.
- Phagnalon pycnophyllon Rech.f.
- Phagnalon pygmaeum (Sieber) Greuter
- Phagnalon quartinianum A.Rich.
- Phagnalon rechingeri Lack & Qaiser
- Phagnalon retecta Qaiser & Lack
- Phagnalon rupestre (L.) DC.
- Phagnalon saxatile (L.) Cass.
- Phagnalon schweinfurthii Sch.Bip. ex Schweinf.
- Phagnalon sinaicum Bornm. & Kneuck.
- Phagnalon sordidum (L.) Rchb.
- Phagnalon stenolepis Chiov.
- Phagnalon × telonense Jord. & Fourr.
- Phagnalon woodii Qaiser & Lack
- Phagnalon yerrimense Qaiser & Lack
