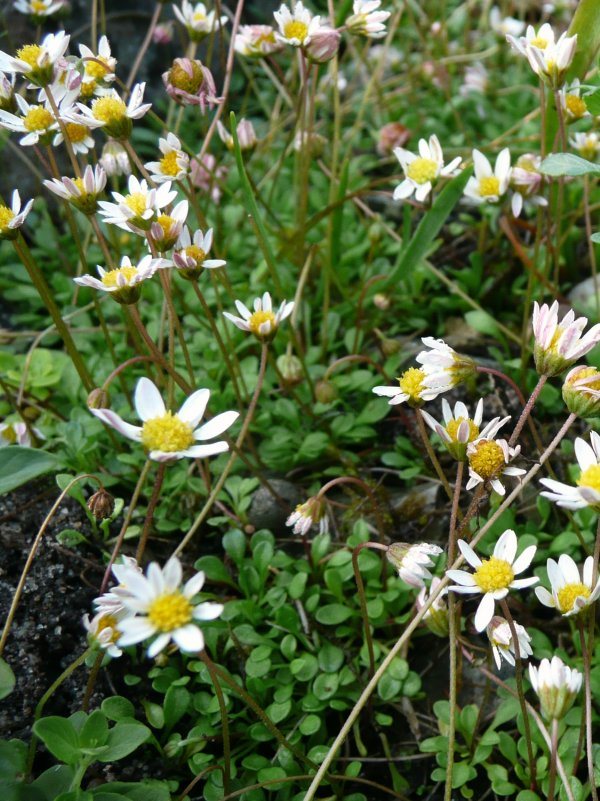
- Bellium bellidioides

Scientific classification
- Kingdom: Plantae
- Clade: Embryophytes
- Clade: Tracheophytes
- Clade: Angiosperms
- Clade: Eudicots
- Clade: Asterids
- Order: Asterales
- Family: Asteraceae
- Subfamily: Asteroideae
- Tribe: Astereae
- Subtribe: Bellidinae
- Genus: Bellium; L.

Type species
- Bellium bellidioides L.

= Bellium =

Genus of flowering plants in the daisy family

Bellium is a genus of flowering plants in the daisy family, Asteraceae, native to the Mediterranean region.

Species

- Bellium bellidioides L. – Balearic Islands, Corsica, Sardinia
- Bellium crassifolium Moris – Sardinia
- Bellium minutum (L.) L. – Greece, Turkey, Cyprus, Malta, Sicily
- Bellium nivale Req. – Corsica
