= Bellium minutum =

Scientific classification
- Kingdom: Plantae
- Clade: Tracheophytes
- Clade: Angiosperms
- Clade: Eudicots
- Clade: Asterids
- Order: Asterales
- Family: Asteraceae
- Genus: Bellium
- Species: B. minutum

Binomial name
- Bellium minutum (L.) L.

Synonyms
- Pectis minuta L.

Species of daisy

Bellium minutum also known as the miniature daisy, is a species of flowering plant in the genus Bellium. It is endemic to Sicily, Turkey, Cyprus and the islands in the north western part of the Aegean Sea.
