= Aquilegia cremnophila =

Scientific classification
- Kingdom: Plantae
- Clade: Tracheophytes
- Clade: Angiosperms
- Clade: Eudicots
- Order: Ranunculales
- Family: Ranunculaceae
- Genus: Aquilegia
- Species: A. cremnophila

Binomial name
- Aquilegia cremnophila Bacch., Brullo, Congiu, Fenu, J.L.Garrido & Mattana

Sardinian columbine species

Aquilegia cremnophila is a perennial flowering plant in the family Ranunculaceae, endemic to Sardinia.

== Description ==
Aquilegia cremnophila is a perennial herb growing to 24–30 cm (9–12 in) tall, with some plants only reaching 18 cm (7.1 in). It has 2–3 pubescent stems which branch at ground level. The basal leaves are covered with downy or woolly hairs and biternate (rarely ternate). The plant produces 4–10 flowers of 48.5–54.5 mm (1.9–2.1 in) diameter, with blue-violet or occasionally lilac sepals measuring 20–26 mm (0.8–1.0 in) long. The petals are the same colour as the sepals, sometimes lilac-coloured inside, and measure 12–16.5 mm (0.5–0.6 in) long with a rounded tip. The nectar spurs are funnel-shaped, curved or slightly hooked, and 14–17.5 mm (0.6–0.7 in) long.

== Taxonomy ==
Aquilegia cremnophila is closely related to Aquilegia nugorensis and Aquilegia nuragica, species occurring in the same Sardinian territories, although it is clearly differentiated from them genetically, in morphology, and in habitat. It was at first doubtfully attributed to A. nugorensis in 2010 before being formally described as a separated species in 2012.

=== Etymology ===
The specific epithet cremnophila means "liking steep slopes or precipices", referring to the plant's habitat.

== Distribution and habitat ==
Aquilegia cremnophila is endemic to the upper slopes of Monte Corrasi in eastern Sardinia, at altitudes of 1,300–1,420 m (4,270–4,660 ft). It grows in shady rock crevices on Mesozoic dolomitic limestones.

== Conservation ==
As of December 2024, the species has not been assessed for the IUCN Red List. Only 250–1000 mature individuals are thought to exist, in four population nuclei within a total area measuring less than 10 km^{2} (3.9 sq mi). The main current threat is grazing by goats and mouflon, although the population is believed to be stable. As the species is geographically and numerically limited, Bacchetta et al. in their formal description in 2012 suggested it be classed as Vulnerable (VU).

== Ecology ==
Aquilegia cremnophila flowers from late May to June, and fruits from July to August. It belongs to a plant community adapted to rocky habitats and rich in Sardinian and Corsican-Sardinian endemic species, including Armeria morisii (thrift or sea pink), Campanula forsythii (bellflower), Euphorbia amygdaloides subsp. semiperfoliata (wood spurge), and Hieracium supramontanum (hawkweed).
