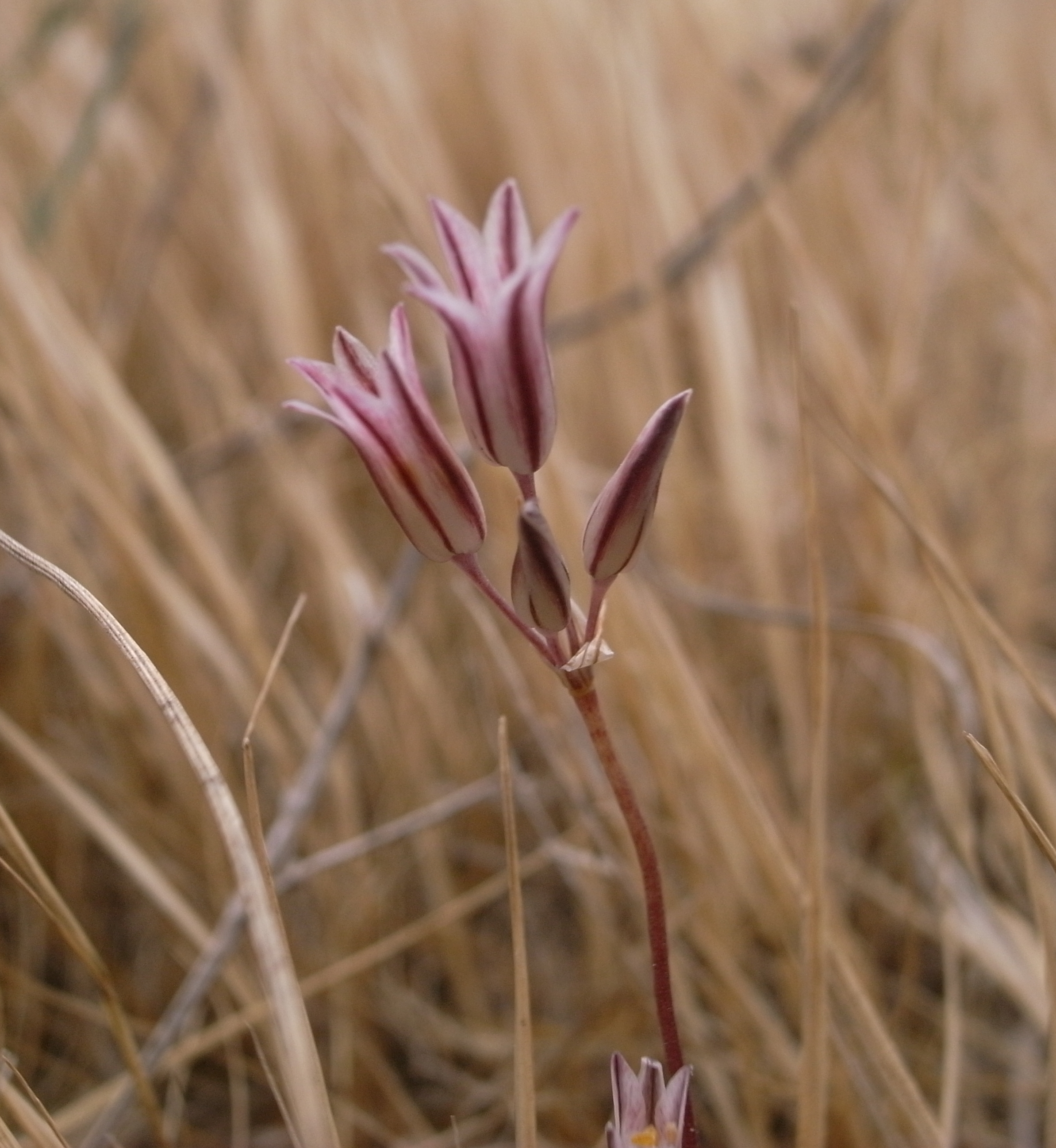
- Allium lojaconoi found at the Dingli Cliffs in Malta

Scientific classification
- Kingdom: Plantae
- Clade: Tracheophytes
- Clade: Angiosperms
- Clade: Monocots
- Order: Asparagales
- Family: Amaryllidaceae
- Subfamily: Allioideae
- Genus: Allium
- Subgenus: A. subg. Allium
- Species: A. lojaconoi

Binomial name
- Allium lojaconoi Brullo, Lanfr. & Pavone

= Allium lojaconoi =

Maltese dwarf garlic

Species of flowering plant

Allium lojaconoi, common name Maltese dwarf garlic, is a species of wild garlic endemic to the Republic of Malta in the Mediterranean. Described as a new species in 1982, it grows in coastal and inland habitats, usually in rocky places.

== Taxonomy ==
The species was first described in 1982 by Salvatore Brullo, E. Lanfranco and Pietro Pavone. It is closely related to A. parciflorum, from Sardinia and Corsica. It is in the family Amaryllidaceae.

== Description ==
Allium lojaconoi is a small bulbous and delicate perennial plant. It grows from an ovoid or nearly spherical bulb measuring 4–6 mm in diameter. The bulb has inner membraneous, transparent, and intact tunics (protective coverings), while the outer tunics are dark, hardened, and withering, easily detaching from the bulb. The plant's stem (or scape) grows up to 10 cm tall with a maximum diameter of 1 mm. The stem is smooth and covered by leaf sheaths in its lower half. The plant typically produces 4–5 thin, green, flattened leaves measuring 2–5 cm long and 0.8–1.5 mm wide. The leaves have 5 rounded ridges on their slightly convex dorsal (back) surface, while the ventral (front) surface is flat or slightly channeled.

The inflorescence (flower cluster) is sparse, containing only 2–12 flowers arranged in a somewhat elliptical shape. The flowers are protected by a two-valved spathe (a specialized bract structure), with unequal membranous, transparent valves measuring 3–7 mm long. These valves are fused at the base, widely divergent at the top, and have more or less extended tail-like tips. The flowers are arranged in four clusters called bostrices, each with very thin membranous bractlets up to 2.5 mm long, supporting 3–9 flowers each.

The flower stalks (pedicels) are unequal, measuring 7–20 mm long, reflexed (bent backward) during flowering and erect when fruiting. The perianth (the collective term for the flower's petals and sepals) is distinctly urn-shaped, with tepals (petal-like segments) ranging from whitish-pink to purple. These tepals are lance-shaped and pointed at the tip, measuring 5–7 mm long and 1–1.2 mm wide, with a wine-purple central vein running to the tip. The tepals are briefly fused at the base into a ring.

The stamens (male reproductive organs) remain shorter than the tepals even after pollination. They have simple, awl-shaped filaments of unequal length—the outer ones up to 1.5 mm long and the inner ones up to 2.5 mm long. The anthers (pollen-bearing structures) are straw-coloured and about 1 mm long. The ovary (female reproductive organ) is yellowish-green, ovoid-oblong, swollen in the lower half and gradually tapering toward the top, measuring 2–2.5 mm long. The style (the stalk-like part of the pistil) is 0.3–0.5 mm long. The fruit is a more or less spherical capsule, 4 mm long and 3.5–4 mm wide.

Allium lojaconoi flowers from late spring to early summer, specifically from late May to early July. As a geophyte (a plant with an underground storage organ), it survives unfavourable conditions by storing nutrients in its bulb. The plant has 16 chromosomes (2n=16).

== Habitat and distribution ==
Allium lojaconoi is endemic to the Maltese archipelago, occurring exclusively on the islands of Malta, Gozo, and Comino in the central Mediterranean Sea. This restricted distribution makes it a true Maltese endemic species.

The plant grows in both coastal and inland habitats, typically growing in semi-rupestral (partially rocky) environments. It can be found in small depressions in limestone rock where a thin layer of soil accumulates, as well as on rocky ledges and crevices. In these microhabitats, A. lojaconoi participates in the formation of ephemeral (short-lived) meadows alongside numerous annual microflora.

Unlike its relative Allium parciflorum (which is endemic to Sardinia and Corsica), A. lojaconoi appears to be more widely distributed throughout its native archipelago. Based on field surveys and herbarium records, the species has been documented at multiple locations across Malta, including Buskett, Wadi Babu, Salina Bay, Misrah Ghonoq, Marfa Ridge, and Ghallis. On Gozo, it has been recorded at Bardan and Xlendi, while on Comino it was collected as early as 1911. The species' preference for limestone substrates aligns with the dominant geology of the Maltese islands.
