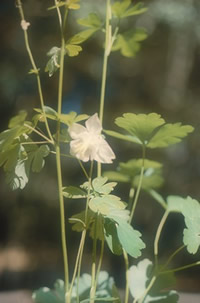

Conservation status
- Critically Endangered (IUCN 3.1)

Scientific classification
- Kingdom: Plantae
- Clade: Tracheophytes
- Clade: Angiosperms
- Clade: Eudicots
- Order: Ranunculales
- Family: Ranunculaceae
- Genus: Aquilegia
- Species: A. barbaricina

Binomial name
- Aquilegia barbaricina Arrigoni & E.Nardi

= Aquilegia barbaricina =

Species of flowering plant

Aquilegia barbaricina, common name Barbaricina columbine, is a perennial species of flowering plant in the family Ranunculaceae. It is endemic to Italy, occurring only on the island of Sardinia.

== Description ==
Aquilegia barbaricina grows on a single stem to a height of 30–60 cm (12–24 in). The stem is covered with fine hairs, branching into 3–5 nearly leafless flower stalks. The leaf stalks divide 1–3 times and bear three leaves or further stalks. Leaflets are three-lobed and have rounded teeth on their outer edge. The plant has 5–8 white, drooping flowers measuring 25–30 mm (1.0–1.2 in) in diameter, with upright, slightly curved spurs.

== Distribution ==
Aquilegia barbaricina is endemic to east-central Sardinia and grows in alder scrub along water courses at 1,300–1,400 m (4,300–4,600 ft) in elevation. Its natural habitats are Mediterranean shrubby vegetation and shrub-dominated wetlands. It is now thought to survive only in a few places in a deep, wooded wetland valley on Monte Spada.

== Taxonomy ==
The species forms a monophyletic clade with the other columbine species endemic to Corsica and Sardinia, Aquilegia bernardii, Aquilegia litardierei, Aquilegia nugorensis and Aquilegia nuragica.

=== Etymology ===
The specific name barbaricina refers to the Barbagia region of eastern Sardinia, where the species is found.

== Conservation ==
The species is almost extinct due to habitat loss and unsustainable collecting. It is an IUCN Red List Critically Endangered plant species and IUCN Top 50 Campaign Mediterranean Island Plant.
