= Sesleriella =

Scientific classification
- Kingdom: Plantae
- Clade: Tracheophytes
- Clade: Angiosperms
- Clade: Monocots
- Clade: Commelinids
- Order: Poales
- Family: Poaceae
- Subfamily: Pooideae
- Supertribe: Poodae
- Tribe: Poeae
- Subtribe: Sesleriinae
- Genus: Sesleriella; Deyl

Type species
- Sesleriella sphaerocephala (Ard.) Deyl

Genus of grasses

Sesleriella is a genus of Alpine plants in the grass family.

Sesleriella is closely related to Sesleria and is included within that genus in some publications.

Species

- Sesleriella leucocephala (DC.) Deyl - Switzerland, Italy, Austria, Slovenia
- Sesleriella sphaerocephala (Ard.) Deyl - Italy, Austria, Slovenia
