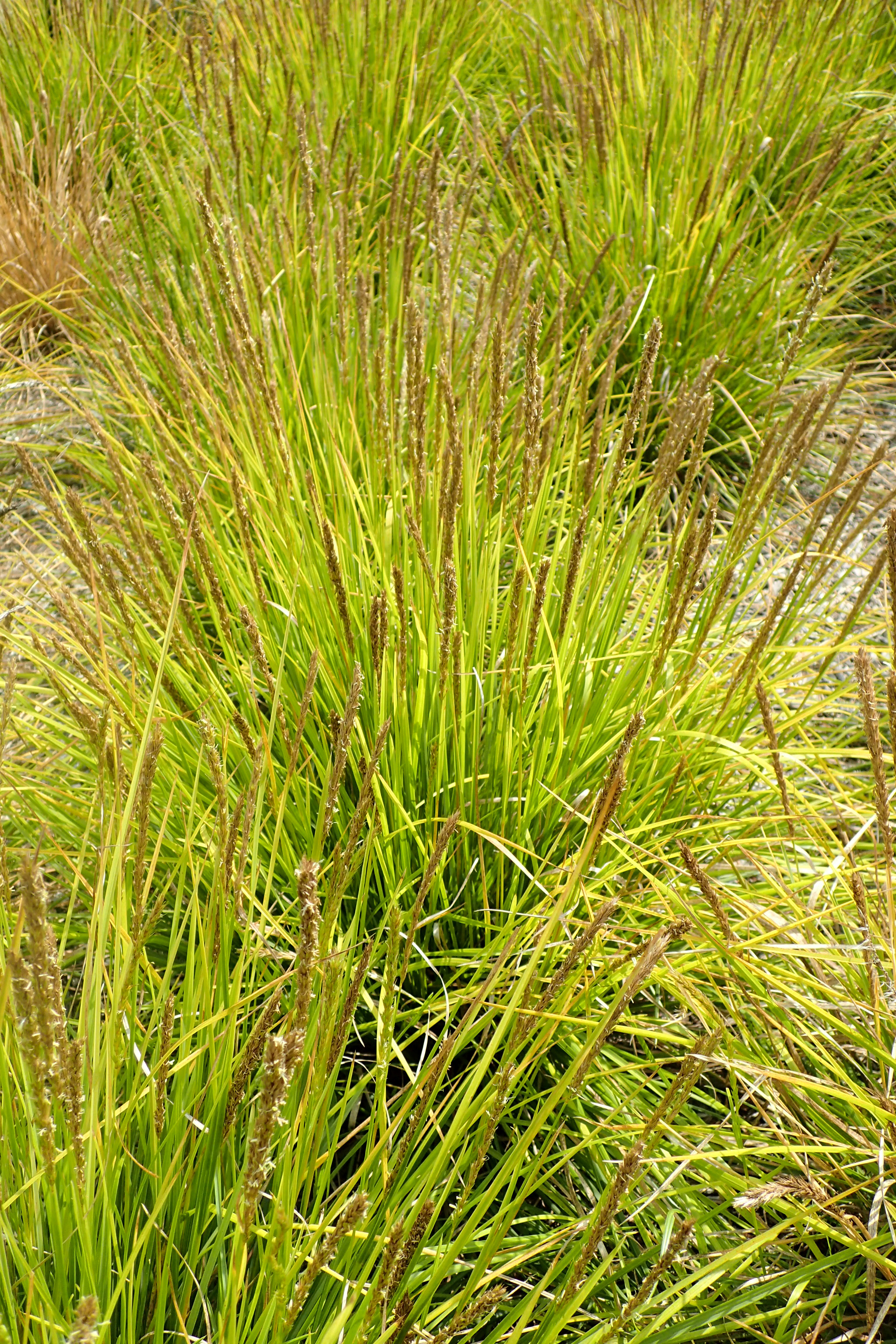

Scientific classification
- Kingdom: Plantae
- Clade: Tracheophytes
- Clade: Angiosperms
- Clade: Monocots
- Clade: Commelinids
- Order: Poales
- Family: Poaceae
- Subfamily: Pooideae
- Genus: Sesleria
- Species: S. autumnalis

Binomial name
- Sesleria autumnalis (Scop.) F.W.Schultz 1861

Synonyms
- Sesleria elongata Host 1802; Phleum autumnale 1771; Aira alba Wulff 1829; Sesleria argentea var. elongata 1850

= Sesleria autumnalis =

Autumn moor grass

Species of grass

Sesleria autumnalis, commonly known as autumn moor grass, is a species of grass within the family Poaceae. It is native to southeastern Europe and often used as ornamental ground cover in North America.

== Taxonomy ==
The first recorded description of the species is attributed to Giovanni Antonio Scopoli, who referred to it as Phleum autumnale in the second edition of his book, Flora Carniolica, which was published in 1771. Friedrich Wilhelm Schultz gave the species its current name, Sesleria autumnalis in his book Archives de Flore.

The species has been referred to by several heterotypic synonyms, including: Sesleria elongata, Aira alba, and Sesleria argentea var. elongata.

== Description ==
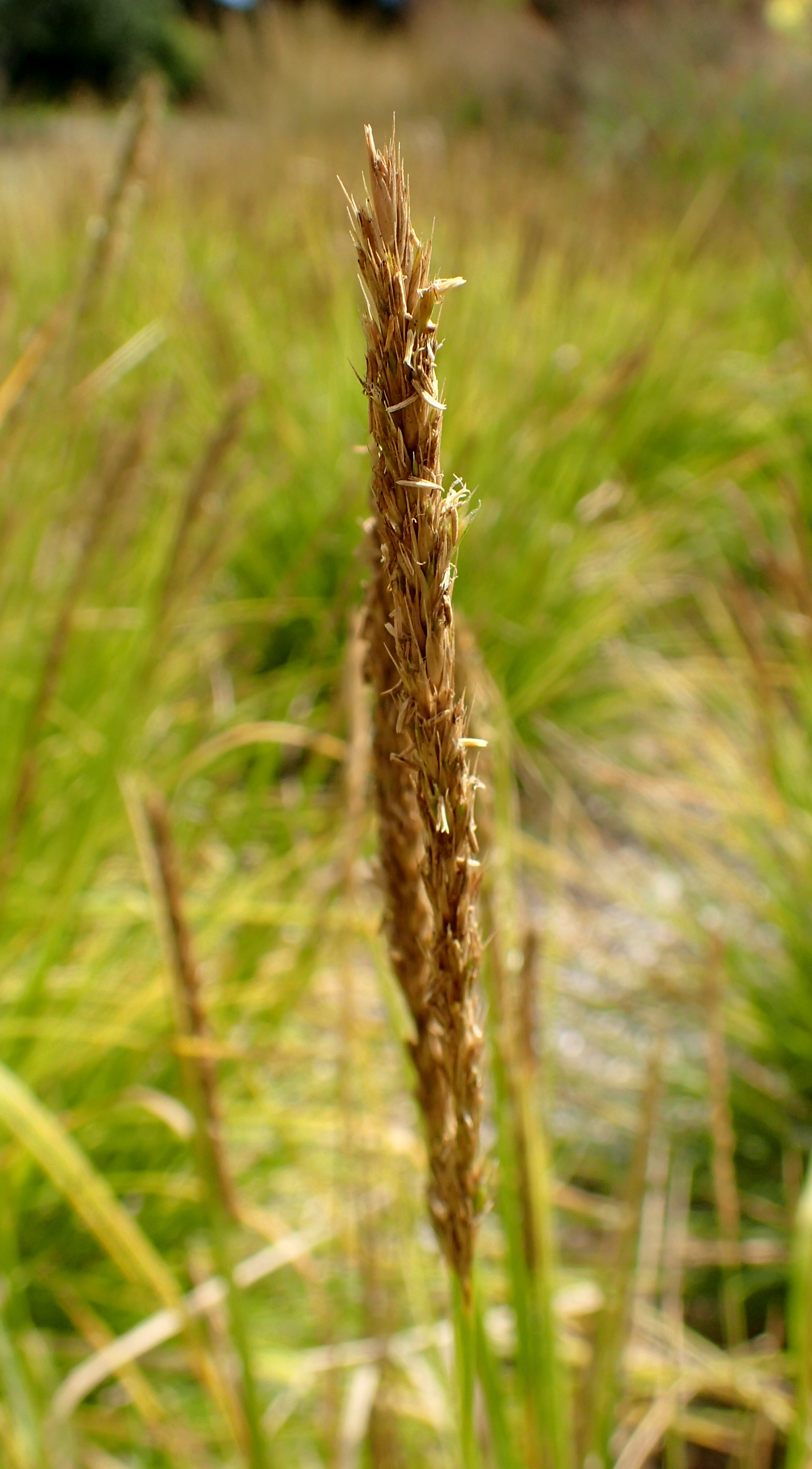

Sesleria autumnalis is a perennial. Its blades are phyllotactic and overhanging, with v-shaped cross sections. In the autumn it changes in color, from light-green to a yellowish brown. It flowers in late summer, when spikelets grow in groups of three on the end of leafless stems.

== Distribution and habitat ==
In its natural habitat, S. autumnalis is often found in wooded regions and grassy or sparsely covered areas. The species is common in the Balkan Peninsula and on the calcite mountains of the eastern Alps.

== Cultivation ==
Sesleria autumnalis is cultivated as an ornamental plant. It has received the Royal Horticultural Society's Award of Garden Merit.
