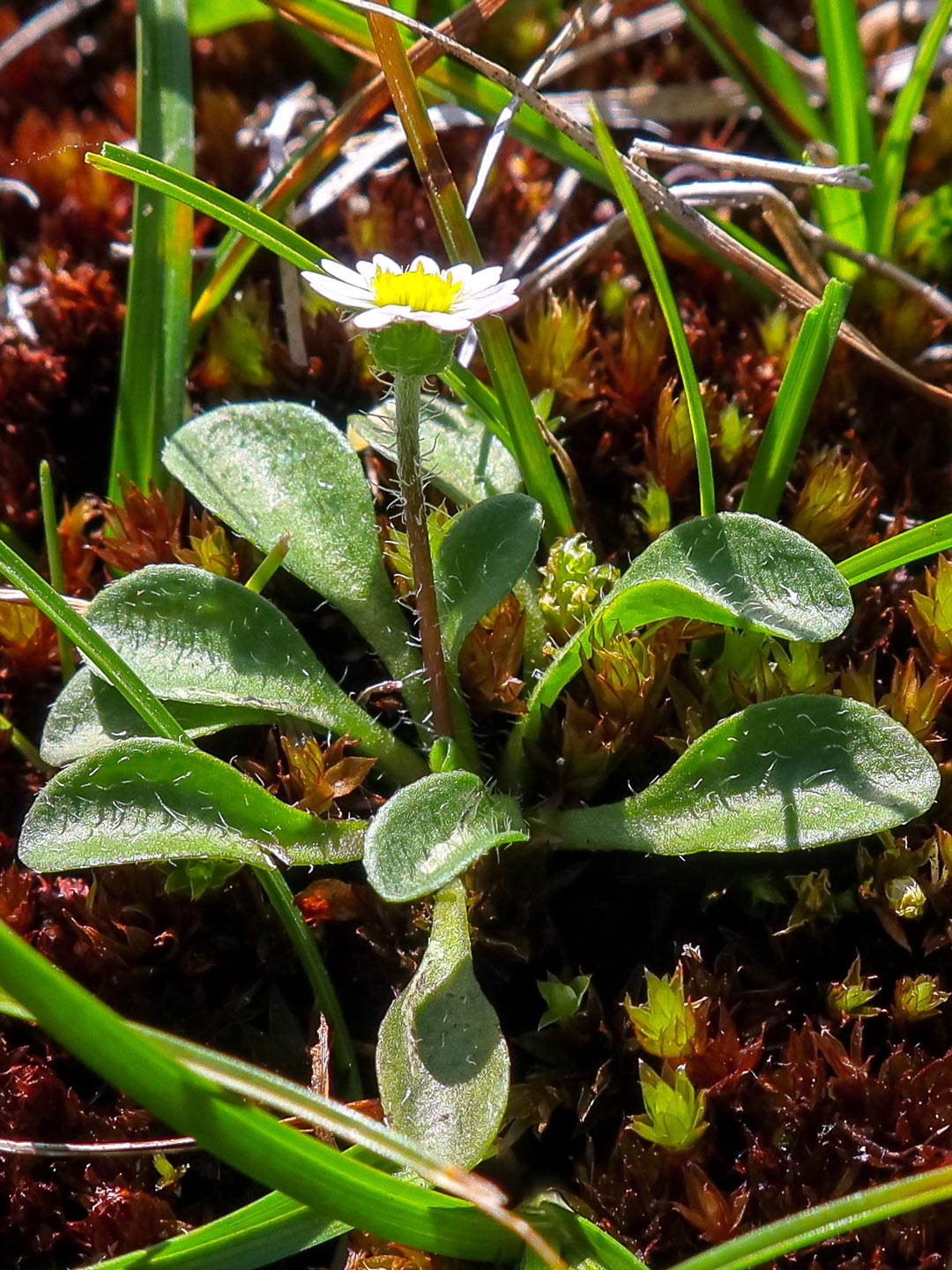

Scientific classification
- Kingdom: Plantae
- Clade: Tracheophytes
- Clade: Angiosperms
- Clade: Eudicots
- Clade: Asterids
- Order: Asterales
- Family: Asteraceae
- Genus: Bellium
- Species: B. nivale

Binomial name
- Bellium nivale Req.

= Bellium nivale =

Species of daisy

Bellium nivale is a species of daisy in the genus Bellium. They are native to Corsica in South Europe.
