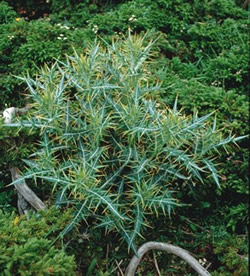
- Lamyropsis microcephala

Scientific classification
- Kingdom: Plantae
- Clade: Tracheophytes
- Clade: Angiosperms
- Clade: Eudicots
- Clade: Asterids
- Order: Asterales
- Family: Asteraceae
- Subfamily: Carduoideae
- Tribe: Cardueae
- Subtribe: Carduinae
- Genus: Lamyropsis (Kharadze) Dittrich

Synonyms
- Cirsium sect. Lamyropsis Kharadze

= Lamyropsis =

Genus of flowering plants

Lamyropsis is a genus of flowering plants in the family Asteraceae which found in Europe and Asia with five described species.

Species

- Lamyropsis charadzeae Kimer. - Republic of Georgia
- Lamyropsis cynaroides (Lam.) Dittrich - Greece, Turkey
- Lamyropsis macracantha (Schrenk) Dittrich - Central Asia
- Lamyropsis microcephala (Moris) Dittrich & Greuter - Sardinia
- Lamyropsis sinuata (Trautv.) Dittrich - Azerbaijan, Republic of Georgia
