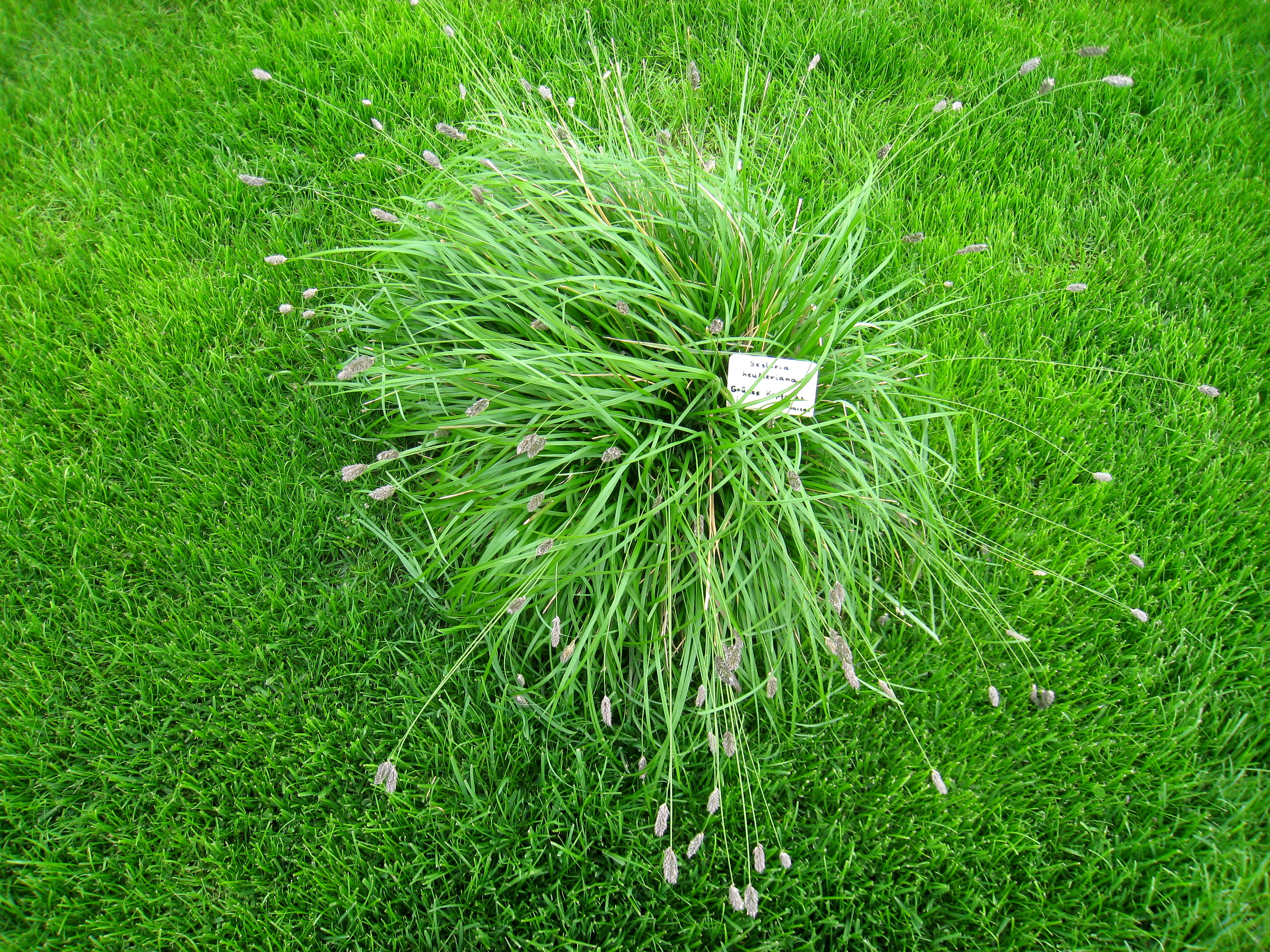

Scientific classification
- Kingdom: Plantae
- Clade: Tracheophytes
- Clade: Angiosperms
- Clade: Monocots
- Clade: Commelinids
- Order: Poales
- Family: Poaceae
- Subfamily: Pooideae
- Genus: Sesleria
- Species: S. heufleriana

Binomial name
- Sesleria heufleriana Schur

= Sesleria heufleriana =

Species of grass

Sesleria heufleriana is a species of perennial grass in the family Poaceae, native to central, southeastern, and eastern Europe and the Caucasus. Culms are erect, ranging from 30–70 cm long; leaf-blades are conduplicate or convolute, and 20–35 cm long by 2–3 mm wide.
