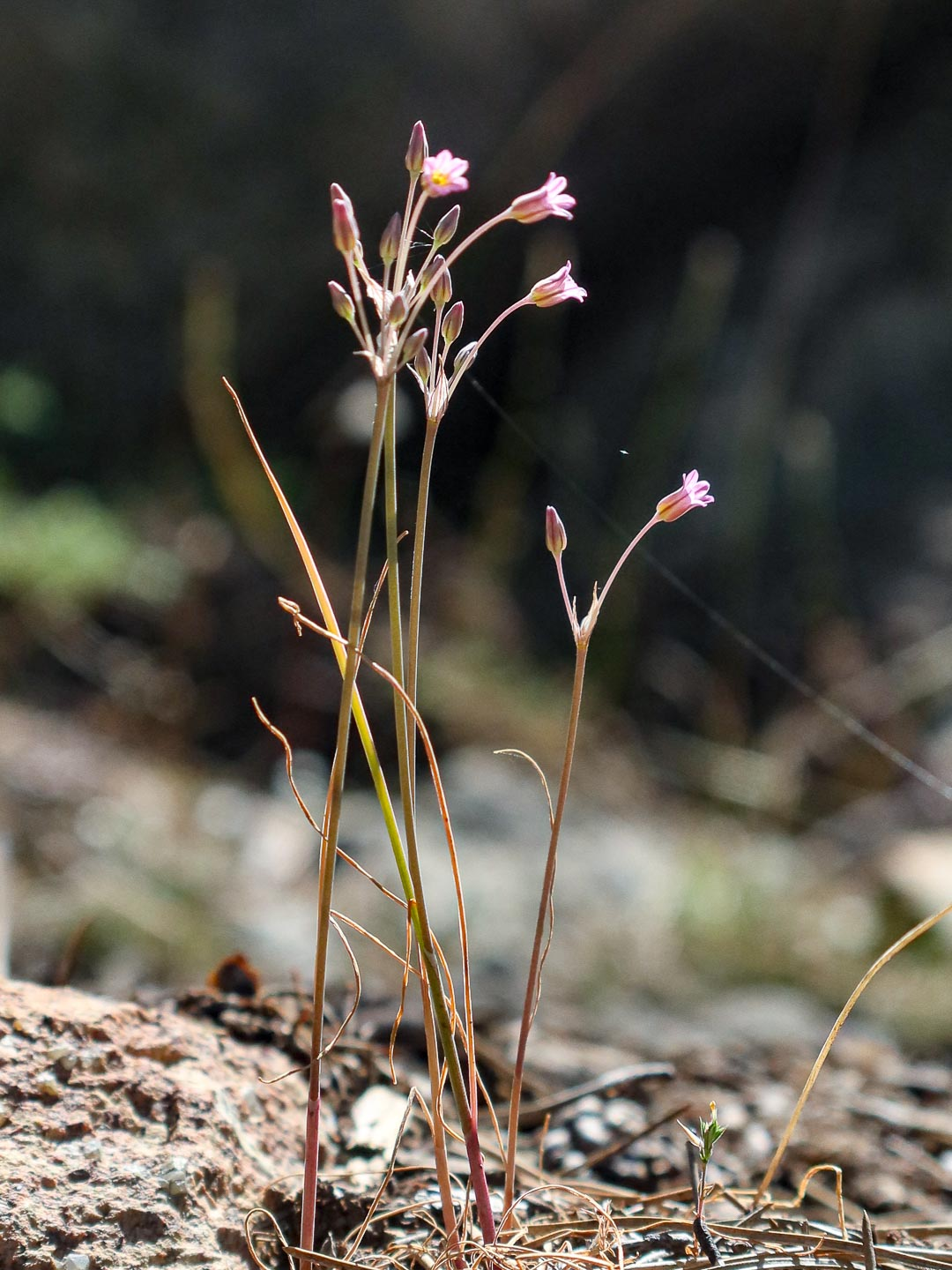

Scientific classification
- Kingdom: Plantae
- Clade: Tracheophytes
- Clade: Angiosperms
- Clade: Monocots
- Order: Asparagales
- Family: Amaryllidaceae
- Subfamily: Allioideae
- Genus: Allium
- Subgenus: A. subg. Allium
- Species: A. parciflorum

Binomial name
- Allium parciflorum Viv.

Synonyms
- Allium moschatum Moris, 1827, illegitimate homonym not L. 1753; Allium pauciflorum Gren. & Godr.

= Allium parciflorum =

Few Flowered Garlic

Species of flowering plant

Allium parciflorum is a plant species known only from the islands of Corsica and Sardinia in the Mediterranean. It is common at all elevations on those two islands but unknown elsewhere.

Allium parciflorum has egg-shaped bulbs. Scape is up to 25 cm tall, round in cross-section. Leaves are thin and tubular, about the same length as the scape but withering before flowering time. Umbels have very few bell-shaped flowers. Tepals are white to pale lavender with prominent dark purple midveins.

Allium parciflorum is closely related to Allium lojaconoi, endemic to Malta.
