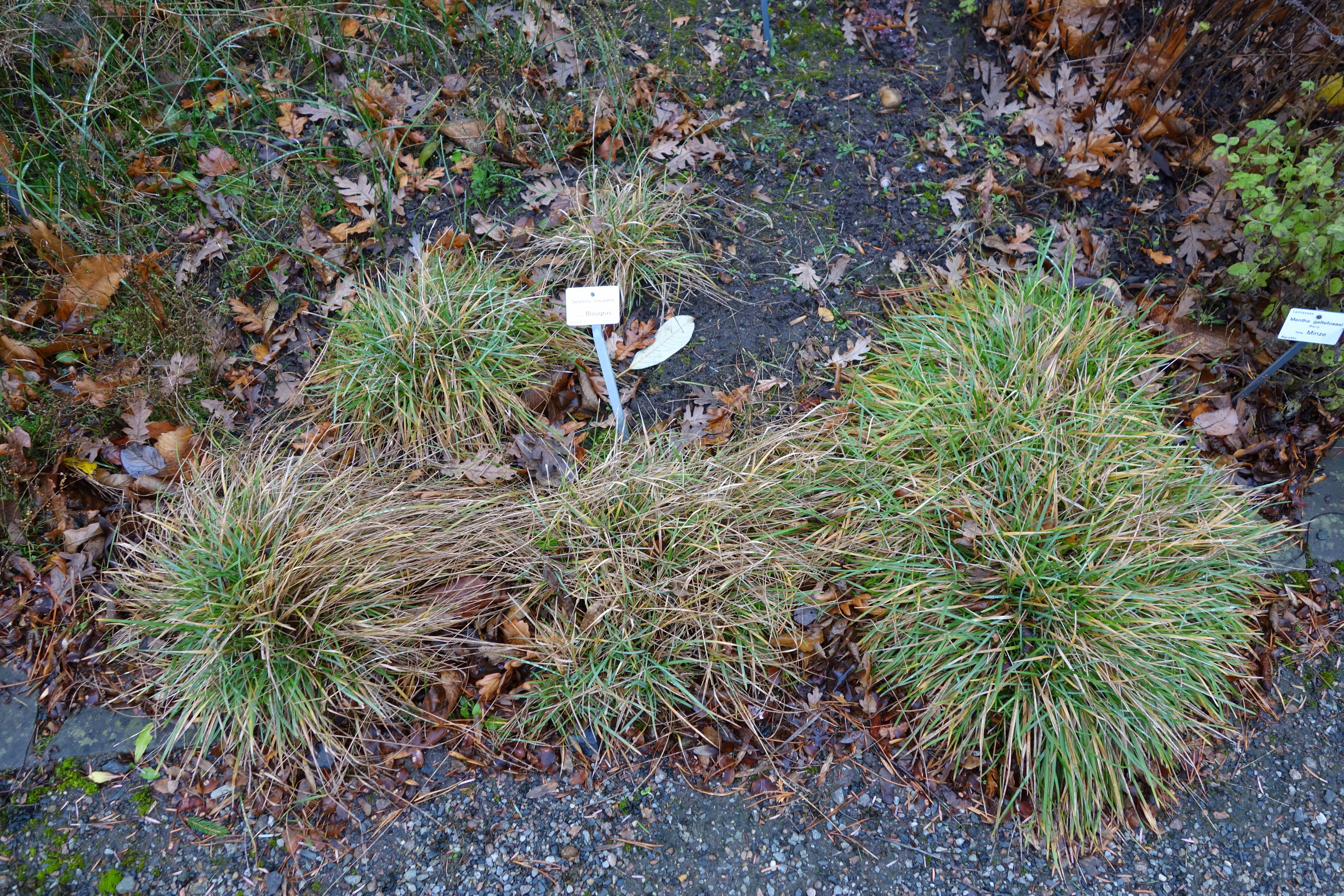

Scientific classification
- Kingdom: Plantae
- Clade: Tracheophytes
- Clade: Angiosperms
- Clade: Monocots
- Clade: Commelinids
- Order: Poales
- Family: Poaceae
- Subfamily: Pooideae
- Genus: Sesleria
- Species: S. insularis

Binomial name
- Sesleria insularis Sommier

= Sesleria insularis =

Species of grass

Sesleria insularis is a species of perennial grass in the family Poaceae, with culms 30–65 cm long.

== Synonyms ==
- Sesleria caerulea var. corsica Hack.
- Sesleria caerulea var. italica Pamp.
- Sesleria corsica (Hack.) Ujhelyi
- Sesleria insularis subsp. barbaricina Arrigoni
- Sesleria insularis subsp. italica (Pamp.) Deyl
- Sesleria insularis subsp. morisiana Arrigoni
- Sesleria insularis subsp. sillingeri (Deyl) Deyl
- Sesleria paparistoi Ujhelyi
- Sesleria sillingeri Deyl
- Sesleria skipetarum Ujhelyi
