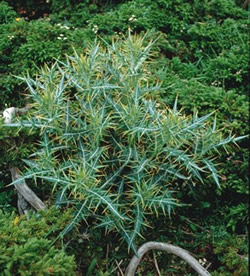

Conservation status
- Critically Endangered (IUCN 3.1)

Scientific classification
- Kingdom: Plantae
- Clade: Tracheophytes
- Clade: Angiosperms
- Clade: Eudicots
- Clade: Asterids
- Order: Asterales
- Family: Asteraceae
- Genus: Lamyropsis
- Species: L. microcephala

Binomial name
- Lamyropsis microcephala (Moris) Dittrich & Greuter

Synonyms
- Cirsium microcephalum Moris; Cnicus microcephalus (Moris) Bertol.

= Lamyropsis microcephala =

Species of flowering plant

Lamyropsis microcephala is a species of flowering plants in the family Asteraceae. It is found only on the Italian island of Sardinia. Its natural habitat is Mediterranean-type shrubby vegetation. It is threatened by habitat loss.
