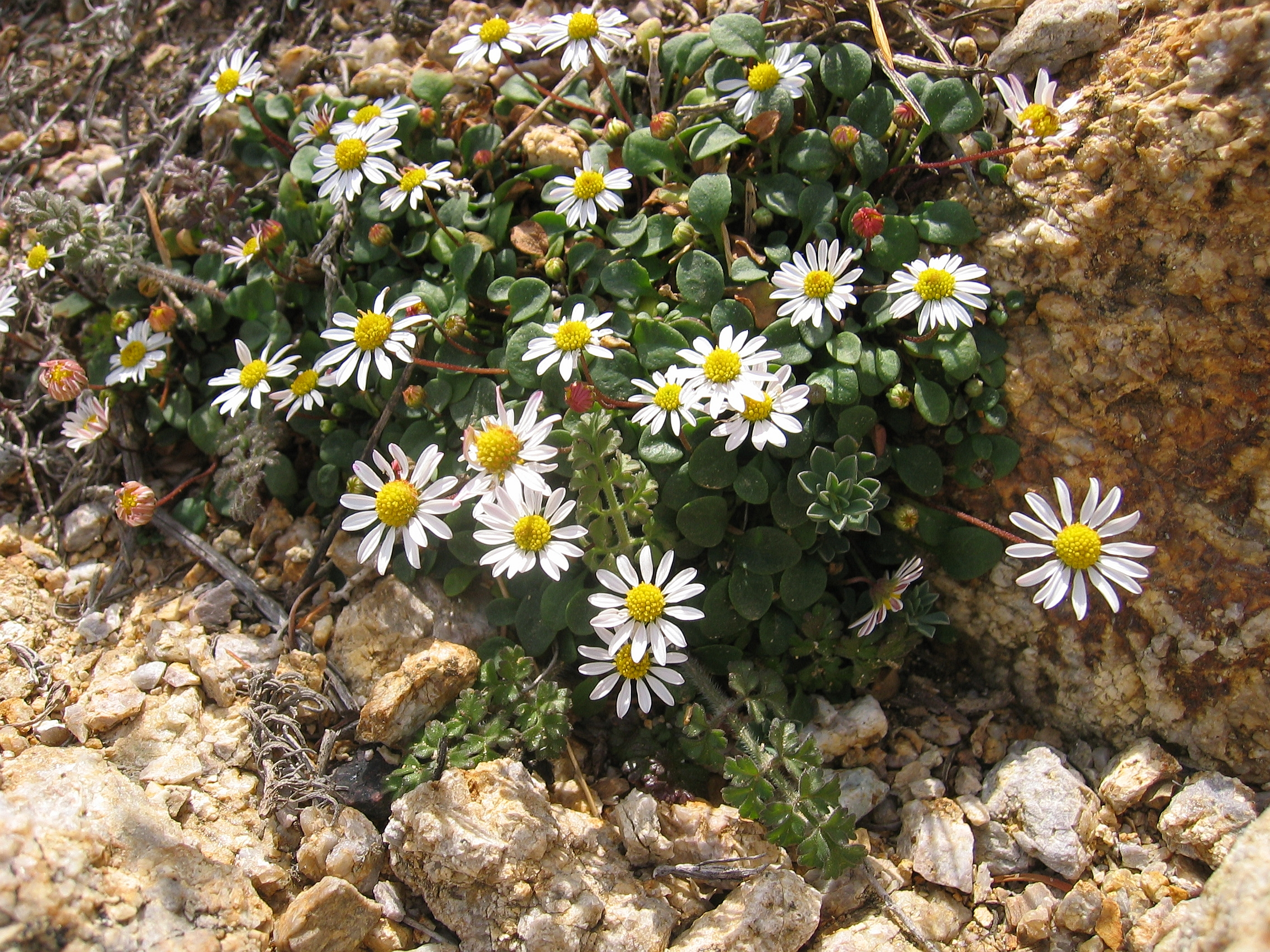

Scientific classification
- Kingdom: Plantae
- Clade: Tracheophytes
- Clade: Angiosperms
- Clade: Eudicots
- Clade: Asterids
- Order: Asterales
- Family: Asteraceae
- Genus: Bellium
- Species: B. bellidioides

Binomial name
- Bellium bellidioides L. 1771

= Bellium bellidioides =

Species of daisy

Bellium bellidioides is a species of plant in the family Asteraceae. It is endemic to the Balearic Islands, Corsica and Sardinia in the Mediterranean and has been introduced to England and Scotland.
