= Quercus ichnusae =

Conservation status
- Least Concern (IUCN 3.1)

Scientific classification
- Kingdom: Plantae
- Clade: Embryophytes
- Clade: Tracheophytes
- Clade: Spermatophytes
- Clade: Angiosperms
- Clade: Eudicots
- Clade: Rosids
- Order: Fagales
- Family: Fagaceae
- Genus: Quercus
- Subgenus: Quercus subg. Quercus
- Section: Quercus sect. Quercus
- Species: Q. ichnusae

Binomial name
- Quercus ichnusae Mossa, Bacch. & Brullo

Species of oak

Quercus ichnusae is a species of oak endemic to Sardinia. It is a deciduous tree growing up to 25 meters tall. It is native to the hills and mountains of Sardinia from 400 to 1200 meters elevation, where it grows in woodlands with the island's other native deciduous oaks.
