= Aquilegia litardierei =

Conservation status
- Not evaluated (IUCN 3.1)

Scientific classification
- Kingdom: Plantae
- Clade: Tracheophytes
- Clade: Angiosperms
- Clade: Eudicots
- Order: Ranunculales
- Family: Ranunculaceae
- Genus: Aquilegia
- Species: A. litardierei

Binomial name
- Aquilegia litardierei Briq.

Synonyms
- Aquilegia pyrenaica var. litardierei (Briq.) Fiori; Aquilegia bernardii var. minor Litard.

Species of flowering plant

Aquilegia litardierei is a perennial species of plant in the family Ranunculaceae, endemic to Corsica.

== Description ==
Aquilegia litardierei is a dwarf species, reaching only 5–12 centimetres (2.0–4.7 inches) in height and with blue-violet flowers half the size of those of Aquilegia vulgaris, the common columbine.

== Taxonomy ==
The species is likely to have derived from an ancient Sardinian-Corsican complex also including the extremely rare and geographically limited Aquilegia nuragica (Nuragica columbine), although A. litardierei is a significantly less specialised species.

=== Etymology ===
The specific epithet litardierei honours the French botanist René Verriet de Litardière (1888–1957), famous for his studies of Corsican flora.

== Distribution and habitat ==
The species is endemic to Corsica, where it grows in rocky alpine habitats.

== Ecology ==
Aquilegia litardierei blooms in summer.

== Conservation ==
The species has not been assessed for the IUCN Red List.
