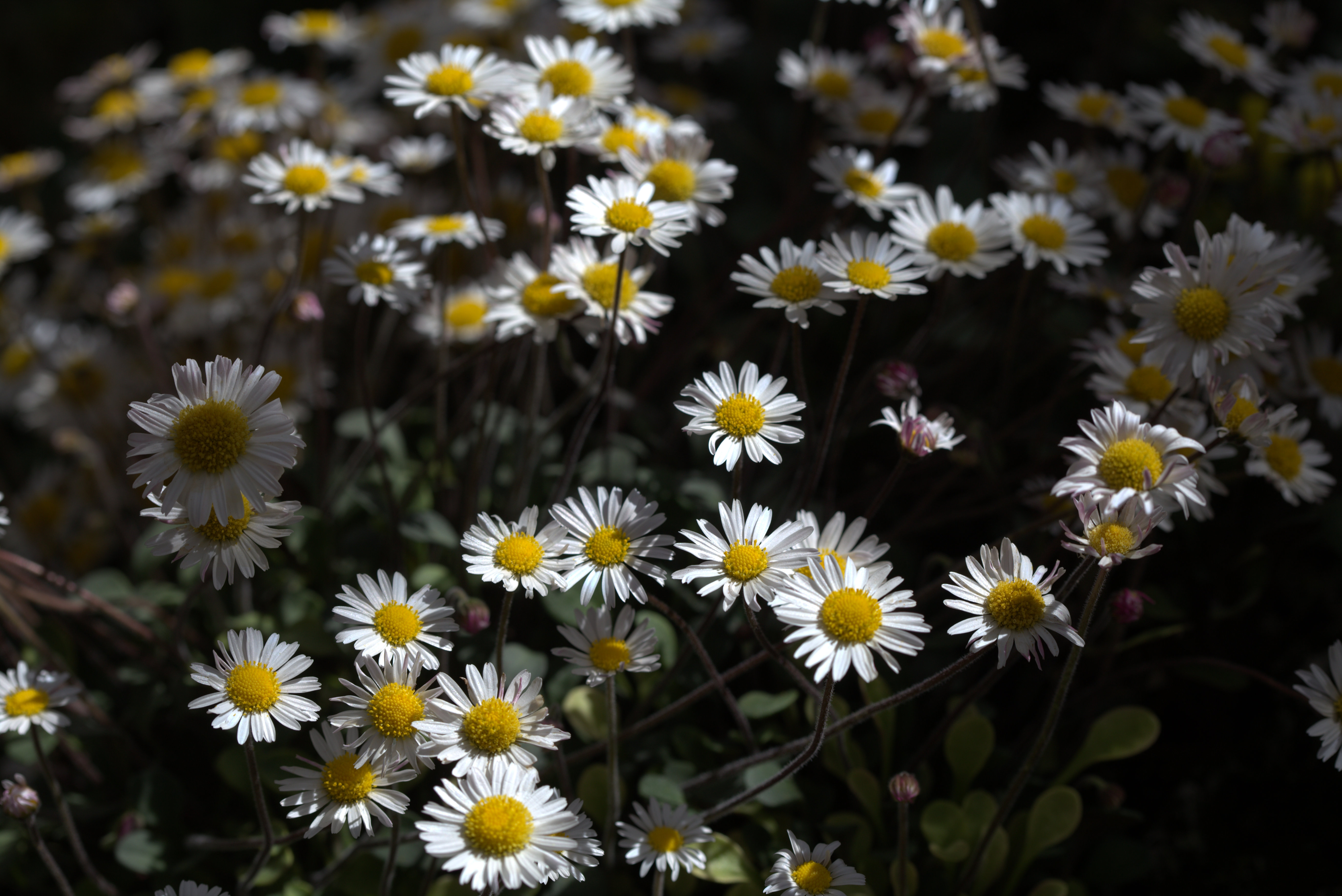

Scientific classification
- Kingdom: Plantae
- Clade: Embryophytes
- Clade: Tracheophytes
- Clade: Spermatophytes
- Clade: Angiosperms
- Clade: Eudicots
- Clade: Asterids
- Order: Asterales
- Family: Asteraceae
- Genus: Bellium
- Species: B. crassifolium

Binomial name
- Bellium crassifolium Moris

= Bellium crassifolium =

Species of daisy

Bellium crassifolium is a daisy species in the genus Bellium. It is native to the Italian island of Sardinia.
