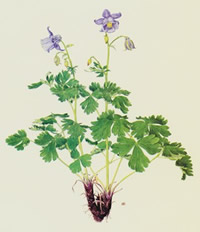
- Botanical illustration of Aquilegia nuragica

Conservation status
- Critically Endangered (IUCN 3.1)

Scientific classification
- Kingdom: Plantae
- Clade: Tracheophytes
- Clade: Angiosperms
- Clade: Eudicots
- Order: Ranunculales
- Family: Ranunculaceae
- Genus: Aquilegia
- Species: A. nuragica

Binomial name
- Aquilegia nuragica Arrigoni & E.Nardi
- Location of Goroppu Canyon, Sardinia, to which Aquilegia nuragica is endemic

= Aquilegia nuragica =

Species of flowering plant

Aquilegia nuragica, commonly called Nuragica columbine, is a perennial flowering plant in the family Ranunculaceae. It is endemic to Italy, in a single canyon in the Supramonte mountain range on the island of Sardinia.

== Description ==
Aquilegia nuragica has a single, scarcely branching vertical stem of 20–45 cm (8–18 in) in height, smooth at the bottom and covered with fine hairs or glands further up. The basal leaves have hairless stalks 12–25 cm (5–10 in) long, each division of which creates a set of three stalks. The leaflets consist of three segments with pointed teeth on the outer edge (contrasting with the closely related Sardinian species Aquilegia barbaricina, which has more rounded teeth). The plant produces three to five nodding, pale blue or white flowers 25–30 mm (1.0–1.2 in) across, consisting of five fused petals with ending in a hooked nectar spur. The fruit is a hooked, drop-shaped capsule.

== Taxonomy ==
The species forms a monophyletic clade with the other columbine species endemic to Corsica and Sardinia, Aquilegia barbaricina, Aquilegia bernardii, Aquilegia litardierei, and Aquilegia nugorensis. However, it is clearly genetically isolated from the other Sardinian species.

=== Etymology ===
The specific epithet nuragica means "Nuragic" in Latin and Italian, referring to the Nuragic civilization that flourished on Sardinia in the Bronze Age.

== Distribution and habitat ==
Aquilegia nuragica is only found in one area of about 50 m^{2} (540 sq ft) at Gorropu, near Urzulei. It grows on the nearly vertical limestone cliffs at altitudes of 620–680 m (2,030–2,230 ft), in a gorge along the seasonal Flumineddu River. It can occasionally be found on the sandy pebble substrate of the riverbed due to seeds being dispersed from the cliff, although these specimens are regularly washed away by floods.

== Conservation ==
Aquilegia nuragica is an IUCN Red List Critically Endangered plant species and IUCN Top 50 Campaign Mediterranean Island Plants, threatened by habitat loss. The population is very small, with only 10 to 15 individuals believed to exist in 2006.

The decline in the plant's population seems to be due to natural factors. However, due to the inaccessibility of the site, it is difficult to research the decline. It is not affected by grazing due to the plant's toxicity.

The species is currently not under any legal protection. Despite occurring within the Gennargentu National Park, the lack of a management committee means no effective preservation measures are in place.

== Ecology ==
The natural habitat of Aquilegia nuragica is in Mediterranean shrubby vegetation.
