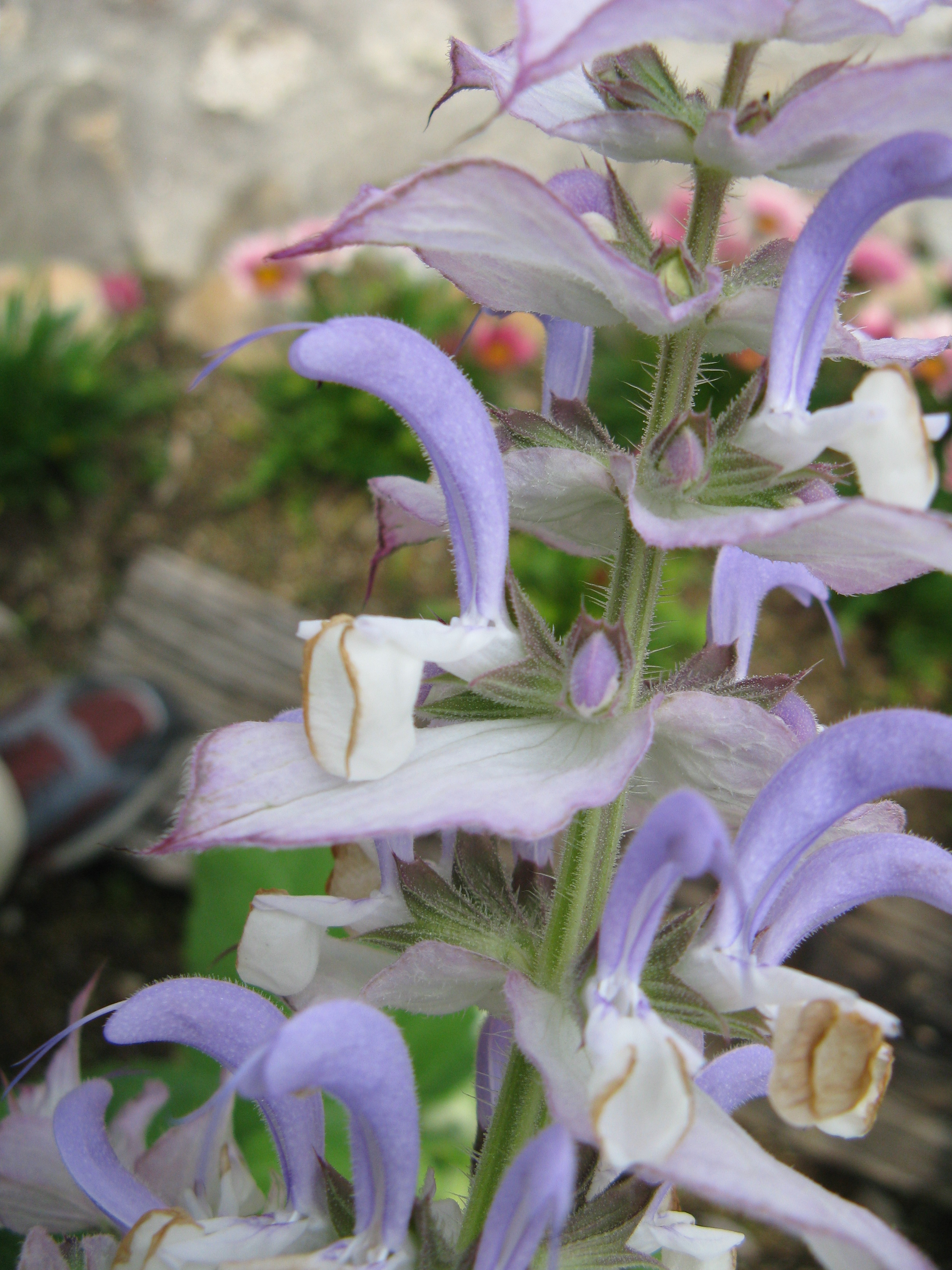

Scientific classification
- Kingdom: Plantae
- Clade: Tracheophytes
- Clade: Angiosperms
- Clade: Eudicots
- Clade: Asterids
- Order: Lamiales
- Family: Lamiaceae
- Genus: Salvia
- Species: S. desoleana

Binomial name
- Salvia desoleana Atzei & Picci

= Salvia desoleana =

Species of shrub

Salvia desoleana is a herbaceous perennial shrub native to the island of Sardinia in the Mediterranean. It is endemic to four or five specific locations on the island in sunny locations on limestone, granitic, and igneous rock. Salvia desoleana was named for the botanist Luigi Desole, and was first described in 1982.

It is a low-growing plant with elongated rhizomatous roots that grow parallel to the ground. Each plant forms a mound 2–3 ft (0.61–0.91 m) tall and 3–4 ft (0.91–1.22 m) wide. The ovate leaves grow as large as 8 in long (200 mm) by 6 in wide (150 mm), with both surfaces covered with hairs and glands, releasing a strong fragrance when crushed or brushed. The 1-foot inflorescences (0.30 m) have hairy stems, with evenly spaced whorls of six flowers, whose calyces include two 1-inch-wide (25 mm) leafy green bracts. The one-inch flowers have a pale lavender upper lip, and an off-white trough-shaped lower lip.
