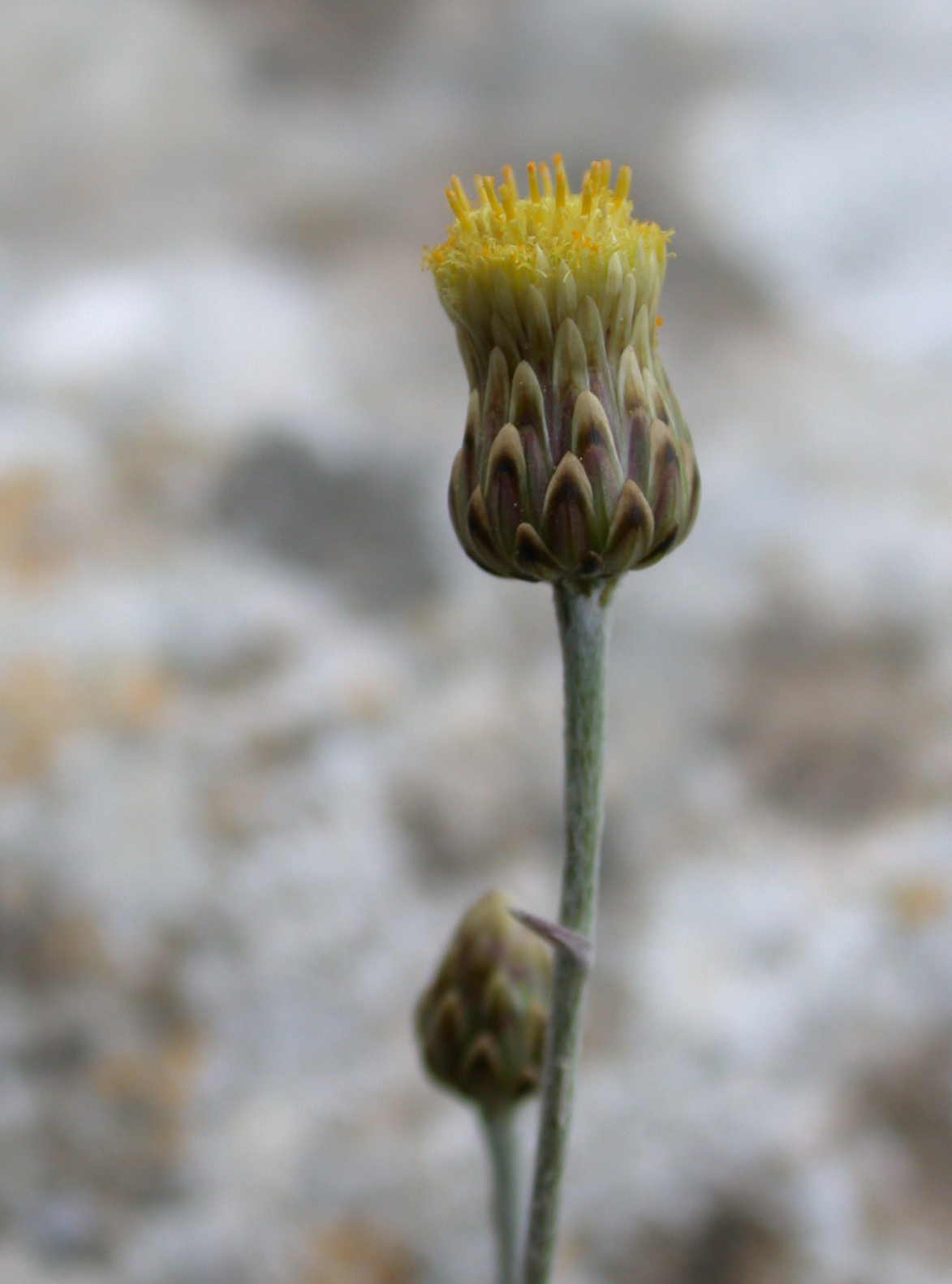

Scientific classification
- Kingdom: Plantae
- Clade: Tracheophytes
- Clade: Angiosperms
- Clade: Eudicots
- Clade: Asterids
- Order: Asterales
- Family: Asteraceae
- Genus: Phagnalon
- Species: P. rupestre

Binomial name
- Phagnalon rupestre (L.) DC. (1836)

Subspecies
- Phagnalon rupestre subsp. morisianum (Ces., Pass. & Gibelli) Arcang.; Phagnalon rupestre subsp. rupestre

Synonyms
- Conyza rupestris L. (1767); Gnaphalon rupestre (L.) Lowe (1868); Phagnalon saxatile subsp. rupestre (L.) Ball (1878)

= Phagnalon rupestre =

Species of plant

Phagnalon rupestre, rock phagnalon, is a species of shrub in the family Asteraceae. It is native to the Mediterranean basin countries of Europe, North Africa, and Western Asia, and to Iran, Iraq, the Arabian Peninsula, and the Canary Islands.

They have a self-supporting growth form, simple, broad leaves and dry fruit. Individuals can grow to 0.25 m.

Two subspecies are accepted.

- Phagnalon rupestre subsp. morisianum (Ces., Pass. & Gibelli) Arcang. – Sardinia
- Phagnalon rupestre subsp. rupestre – entire range

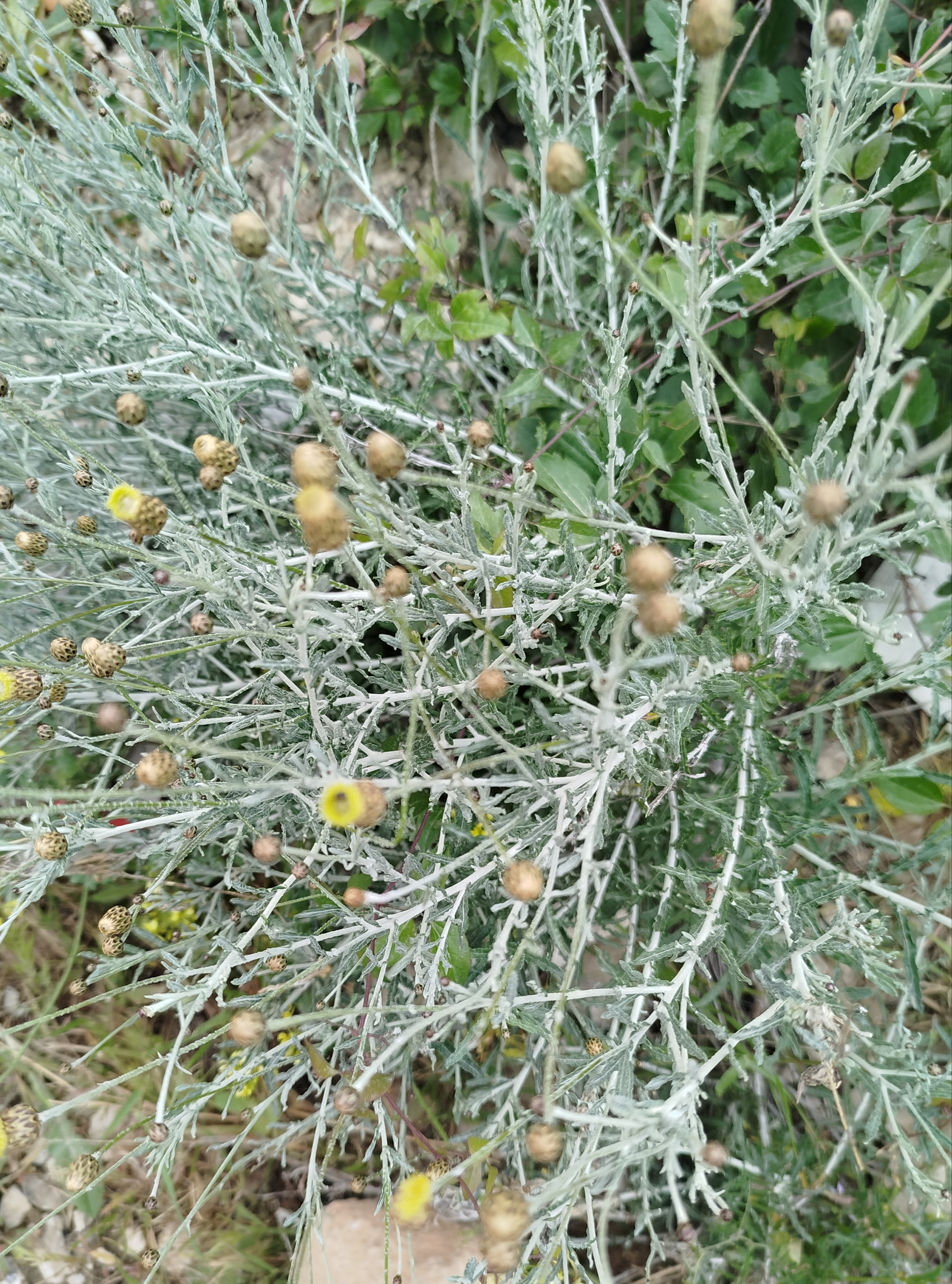
Phagnalon saxatile in its natural habitat

== Sources ==
This article incorporates text from a free content work. Licensed under CC0 (license statement/permission). Text taken from Phagnalon rupestre. Encyclopedia of Life.
