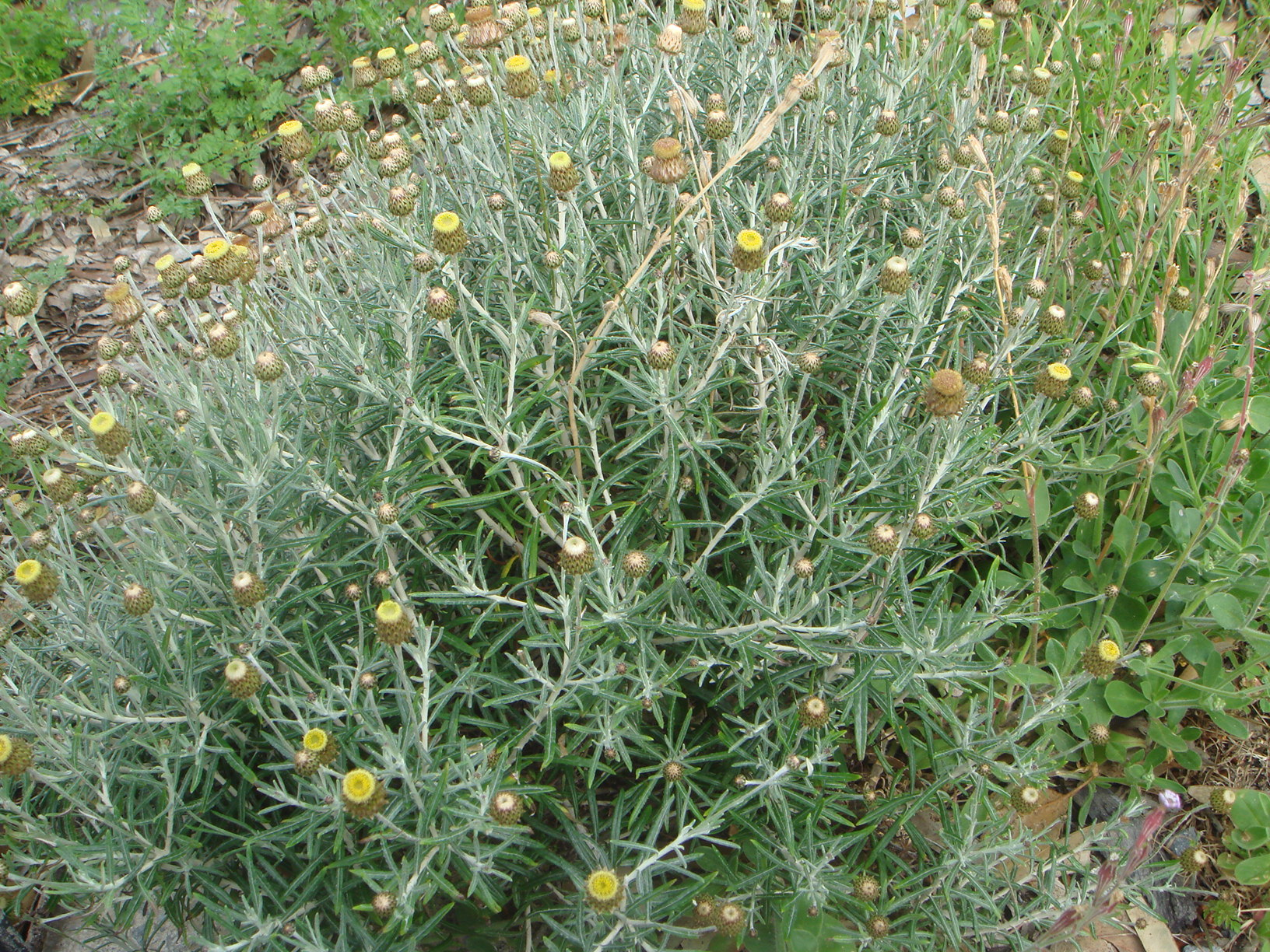

Scientific classification
- Kingdom: Plantae
- Clade: Tracheophytes
- Clade: Angiosperms
- Clade: Eudicots
- Clade: Asterids
- Order: Asterales
- Family: Asteraceae
- Genus: Phagnalon
- Species: P. saxatile

Binomial name
- Phagnalon saxatile (L.) Cass.

= Phagnalon saxatile =

Mediterranean Phagnalon

Species of flowering plant

Phagnalon saxatile, known as the mediterranean phagnalon, is a plant that can grow up to 50 centimetres (20 in) high.
