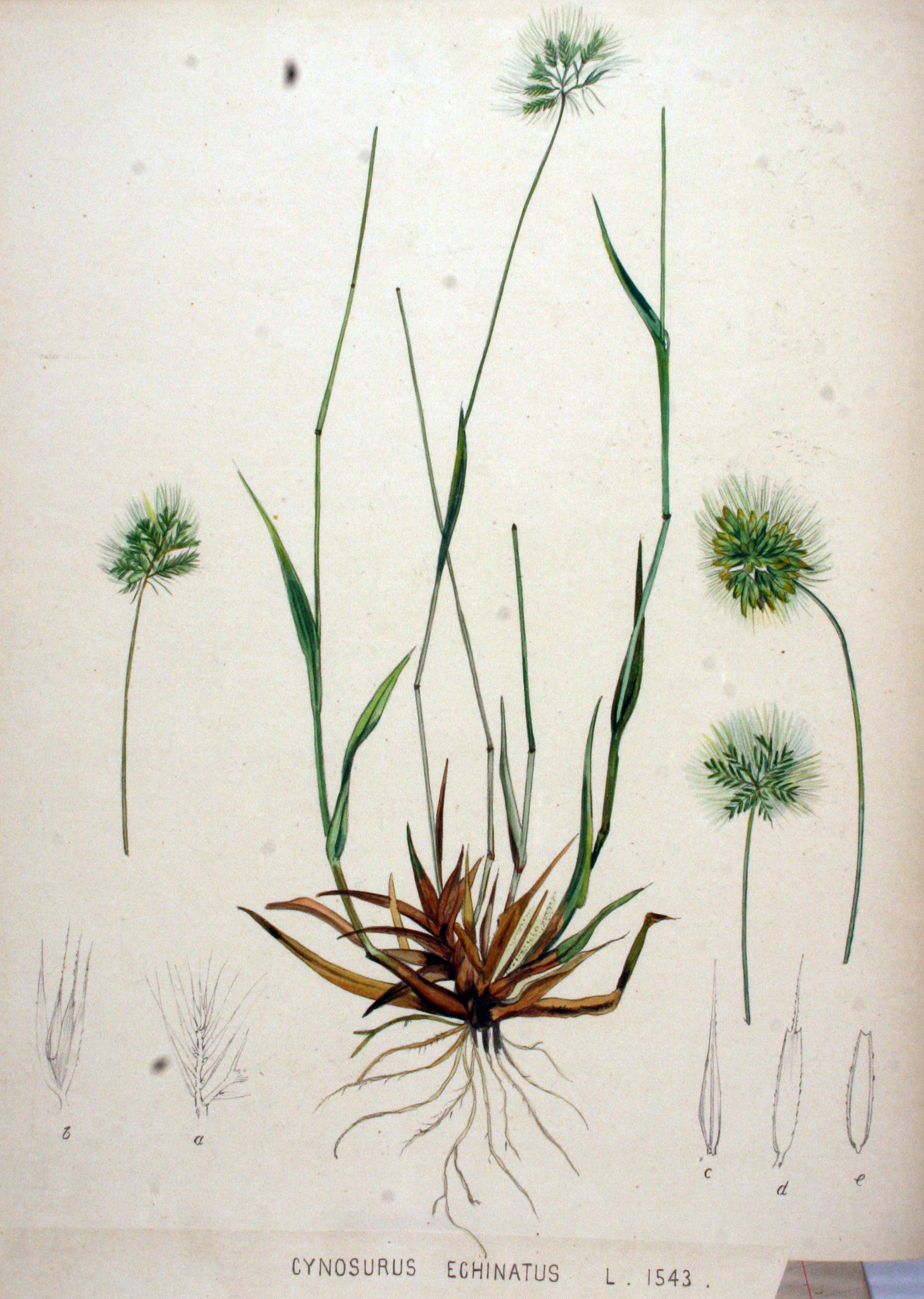
- Cynosurus echinatus

Scientific classification
- Kingdom: Plantae
- Clade: Tracheophytes
- Clade: Angiosperms
- Clade: Monocots
- Clade: Commelinids
- Order: Poales
- Family: Poaceae
- Subfamily: Pooideae
- Supertribe: Poodae
- Tribe: Poeae
- Subtribe: Cynosurinae; Fr.
- Genus: Cynosurus; L.

Type species
- Cynosurus cristatus L.

Synonyms
- Phalona Dumort.

= Cynosurus =

Genus of grasses

Cynosurus is a genus of Eurasian and North African plants in the grass family. Plants in this genus are known generally as dogstail grass. They are native to the Europe, the Azores, Algeria, Tunisia, Turkey, the Caucasus, and Iran, but some have been introduced into Australia as well as North and South America.

== Species ==
Three species are currently accepted.

- Cynosurus cristatus L. - Europe, Azores, Caucasus, Iran, Turkey
- Cynosurus peltieri Maire - Algeria, Tunisia
- Cynosurus polybracteatus Poir. - Algeria, Tunisia

=== Formerly included ===
Numerous names have been coined using the name Cynosurus, applied to species now regarded as better suited to other genera (Aegopogon, Apera, Beckmannia, Bouteloua, Centotheca, Chloris, Ciliochloa, Coelachyrum, Cynodon, Dactyloctenium, Desmostachya, Dinebra, Eleusine, Enteropogon, Falona, Festuca, Harpochloa, Lamarckia, Leptochloa, Ochthochloa, Oreochloa, Polypogon, Rostraria, Sclerochloa, Sesleria, Sesleriella, Tribolium, and Wangenheimia). Here are links to help you find the appropriate information.

- Cynosurus aegyptiacus - Dactyloctenium aegyptium
- Cynosurus aegyptius - Dactyloctenium aegyptium
- Cynosurus ara - Eleusine indica
- Cynosurus aureus - Lamarckia aurea
- Cynosurus balansae Coss. & Durieu – Falona balansae (Coss. & Durieu) V.Jirásek & Chrtek
- Cynosurus caeruleus - Sesleria caerulea
- Cynosurus capillaceus - Leptochloa chinensis
- Cynosurus capillaris - Leptochloa panicea
- Cynosurus capitatus - Sesleria ovata
- Cynosurus carolinianus - Dactyloctenium aegyptium
- Cynosurus cavara - Dactyloctenium aegyptium
- Cynosurus ciliaris Raspail 1825 - Centotheca lappacea
- Cynosurus ciliaris Rottler ex Hook.f 1896 - Dactyloctenium aegyptium
- Cynosurus coeruleus - Sesleria argentea
- Cynosurus coloratus Lehm. ex Steud. - Falona colorata (Lehm. ex Steud.) Röser, Tkach & Rasti
- Cynosurus coracanus - Eleusine coracana
- Cynosurus coromandelianus - Dinebra retroflexa
- Cynosurus cylindricus - Sesleria argentea
- Cynosurus dactylon - Cynodon dactylon
- Cynosurus distachyos - Dactyloctenium aegyptium
- Cynosurus distichus - Oreochloa disticha
- Cynosurus domingensis - Leptochloa virgata
- Cynosurus durus Forssk. 1775 - Desmostachya bipinnata
- Cynosurus durus L. 1753 - Sclerochloa dura
- Cynosurus echinatus L. - Falona echinata (L.) Dumort.
- Cynosurus elegans Desf. – Ciliochloa elegans (Desf.) Röser, Tkach & Rasti
- Cynosurus eruciformis - Beckmannia eruciformis
- Cynosurus falcatus - Harpochloa falx
- Cynosurus filiformis - Chloris filiformis
- Cynosurus floccifolius - Eleusine floccifolia
- Cynosurus glaber - Dactyloctenium glabrum
- Cynosurus gracilis Cav. ex Roem. & Schult 1817. not Viv. 1824 - Aegopogon cenchroides
- Cynosurus indicus - Eleusine indica
- Cynosurus junceus Murb. – Falona juncea (Murb.) V.Jirásek & Chrtek
- Cynosurus juncifolius - Sesleria juncifolia
- Cynosurus lagopoides - Coelachyrum lagopoides
- Cynosurus lima - Wangenheimia lima
- Cynosurus macara - Dactyloctenium aegyptium
- Cynosurus macrocephalus - Sesleria ovata
- Cynosurus magellanicus - Festuca magellanica
- Cynosurus microcephalus - Sesleria ovata
- Cynosurus monostachyos - Enteropogon monostachyos
- Cynosurus ovatus - Psilathera ovata
- Cynosurus paniceus - Polypogon monspeliensis
- Cynosurus paniculatus - Tribolium uniolae
- Cynosurus paniculatus - Dinebra retroflexa
- Cynosurus paspaloides - Eustachys paspaloides
- Cynosurus pectinatus - Eleusine indica
- Cynosurus penicillatus - Chloris virgata
- Cynosurus phleoides - Rostraria hispida
- Cynosurus retroflexus - Dinebra retroflexa
- Cynosurus rupestris - Sesleria caerulea
- Cynosurus scoparius - Chloris radiata
- Cynosurus secundus - Bouteloua curtipendula
- Cynosurus sesleria - Sesleria caerulea
- Cynosurus siculus - Desmazeria sicula
- Cynosurus sphaerocephalus - Sesleriella sphaerocephala
- Cynosurus splendens - Apera interrupta
- Cynosurus tenellus - Aegopogon tenellus
- Cynosurus tenerrimus - Leptochloa panicea
- Cynosurus ternatus - Chloris flagellifera
- Cynosurus tristachyos - Eleusine tristachya
- Cynosurus turcomanicus Proskur. – Ciliochloa turcomanica (Proskur.) Röser, Tkach & Rasti
- Cynosurus uniflorus - Cynodon dactylon
- Cynosurus uniolae - Tribolium uniolae
- Cynosurus virgatus - Leptochloa virgata
