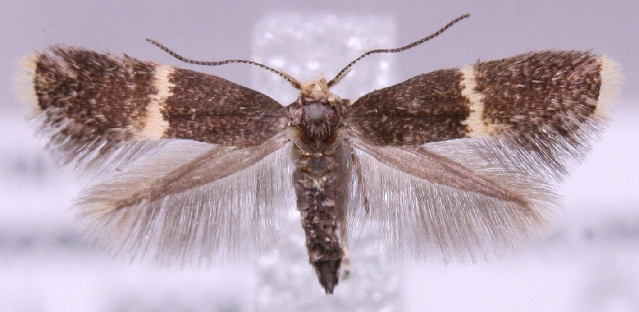

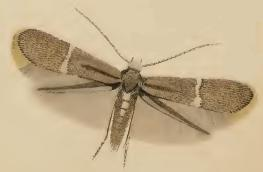

Scientific classification
- Domain: Eukaryota
- Kingdom: Animalia
- Phylum: Arthropoda
- Class: Insecta
- Order: Lepidoptera
- Family: Elachistidae
- Genus: Elachista
- Species: E. adscitella

Binomial name
- Elachista adscitella Stainton, 1851

Synonyms
- Elachista (Aphelosetia) revinctella auct.

= Elachista adscitella =

Species of moth

Elachista adscitella is a moth of the family Elachistidae found in Europe.

== Description ==
The wingspan is 9–11 millimetres (0.35–0.43 in).

The larvae feed on false-brome (Brachypodium sylvaticum), Carex elata, a bunch grass (Calamagrostis arundinacea), tufted hair-grass (Deschampsia cespitosa), wavy hair-grass (Deschampsia flexuosa), bearded couch (Elymus caninus), Festuca altissima, Festuca drymeja, giant fescue (Festuca gigantea), mountain melick (Melica nutans), wood mellick (Melica uniflora), wood millett (Milium effusum), Phleum species, broad-leaved meadow-grass (Poa chaixii), Poa remota, Sesleria albicans, Sesleria argentea, blue moor-grass (Sesleria caerulea) and Sesleria sadlerana.

== Distribution ==
It is found in all of Europe, except Iceland, the Balkan Peninsula, Ukraine and Lithuania.
