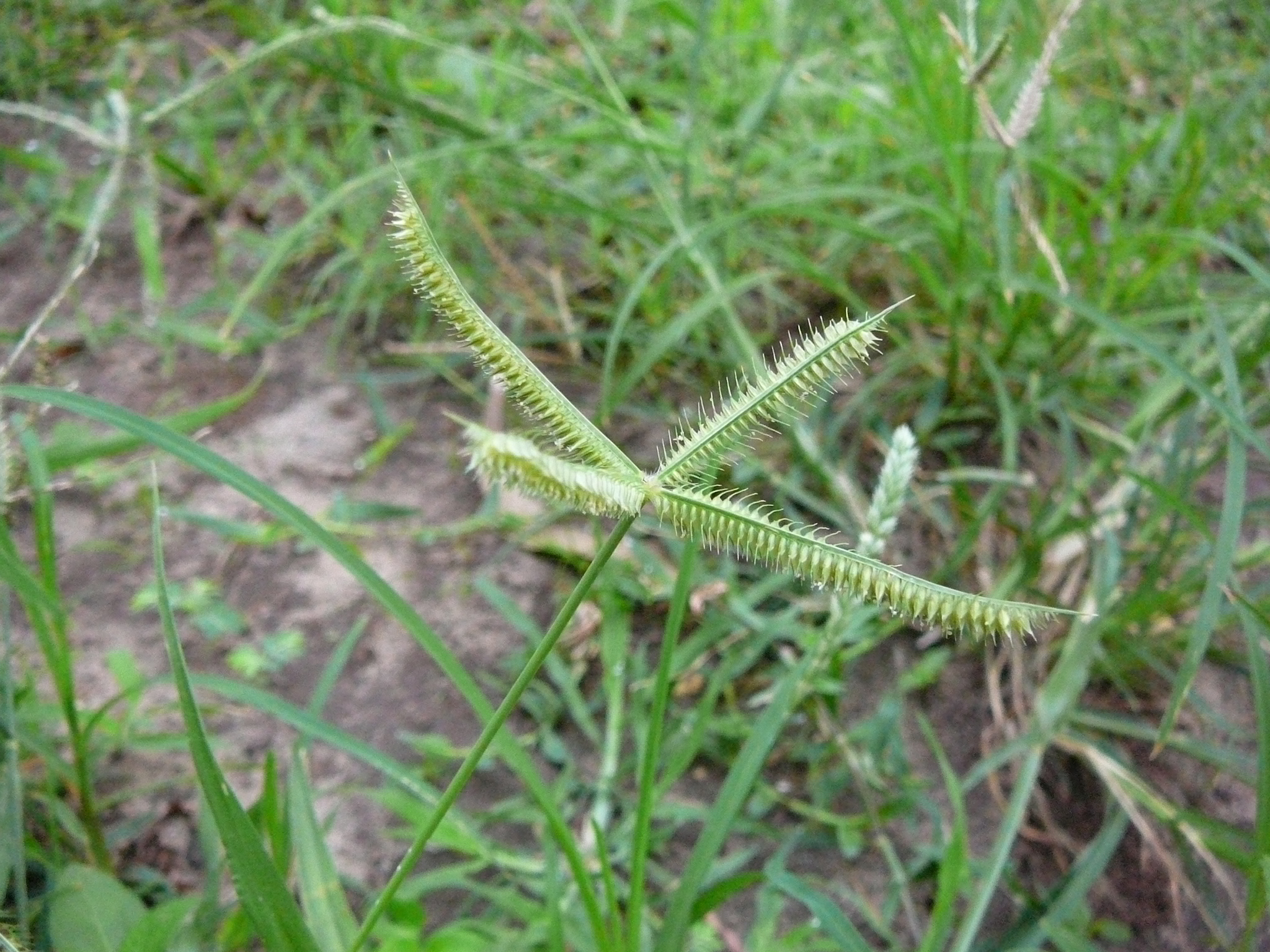

Scientific classification
- Kingdom: Plantae
- Clade: Tracheophytes
- Clade: Angiosperms
- Clade: Monocots
- Clade: Commelinids
- Order: Poales
- Family: Poaceae
- Subfamily: Chloridoideae
- Tribe: Cynodonteae
- Subtribe: Dactylocteniinae
- Genus: Dactyloctenium; Willd.

Type species
- Dactyloctenium aegyptium (L.) Willd.

= Dactyloctenium =

Genus of grasses

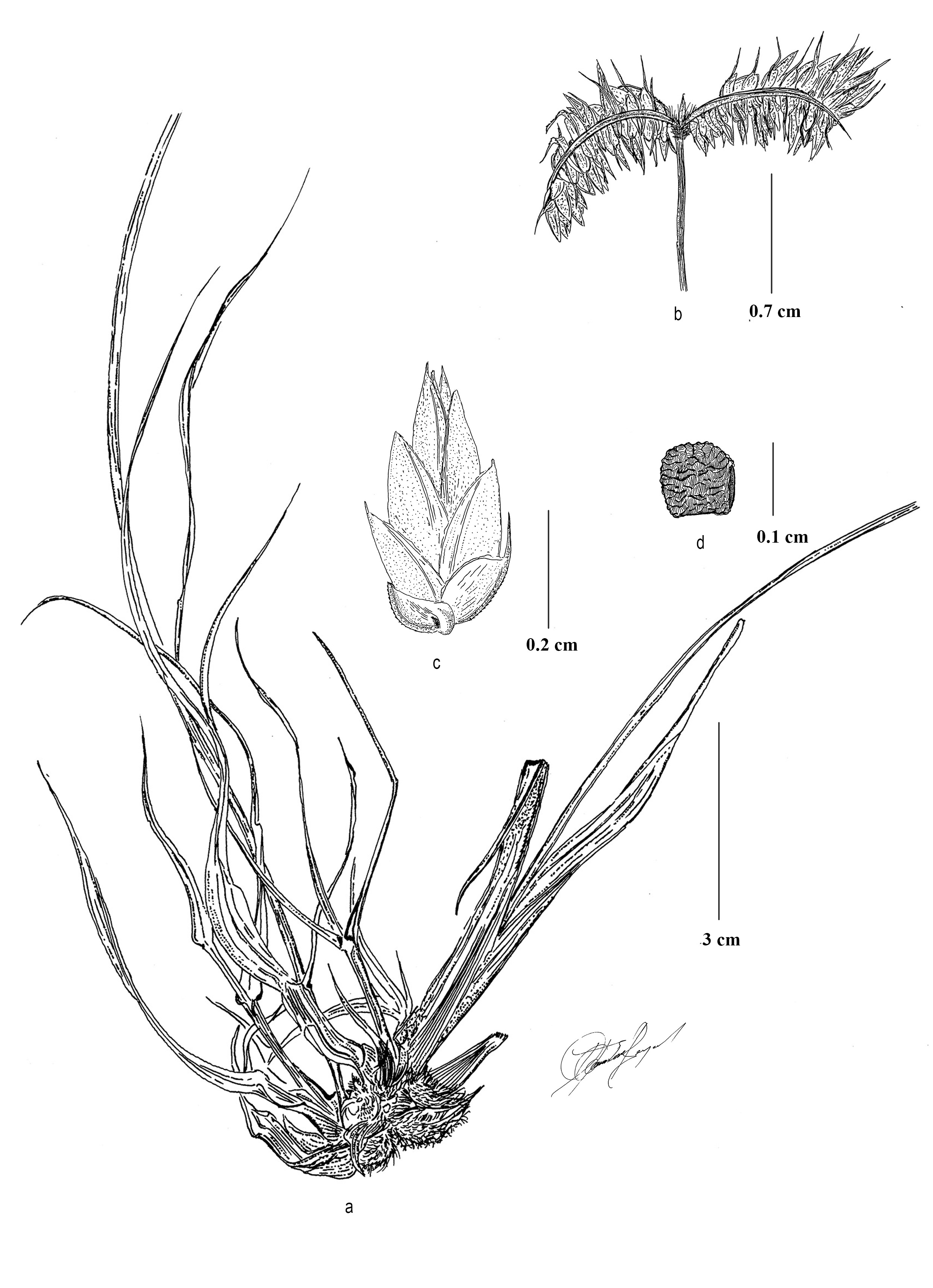
Dactyloctenium scindicum Boiss.

Dactyloctenium is a genus of Asian, African, and Australian plants in the grass family. There are about 13 species in the genus in the world, in which 3 are known to occur in India. A common name for the plants is crowfoot grasses.

Species

- Dactyloctenium aristatum - East Africa, Arabian Peninsula; Indian subcontinent
- Dactyloctenium aegyptium – Egyptian grass - much of Africa; Asia from Turkey to Taiwan to Indonesia; various islands of Pacific + Indian Oceans; naturalized in Australia, the Americas, southern Europe; more Pacific Islands
- Dactyloctenium australe – Durban grass - eastern + southern Africa; Madagascar
- Dactyloctenium buchananensis - Queensland
- Dactyloctenium capitatum - Madagascar
- Dactyloctenium ctenioides - Kenya, Tanzania, Mozambique, Aldabra, Mauritius, Madagascar, Seychelles, Chagos Islands, and Florida, USA (introduced).
- Dactyloctenium germinatum – Sudan crowfoot grass - eastern + southern Africa; Madagascar; naturalized in Maryland, southern Mexico
- Dactyloctenium giganteum - eastern + southern Africa; Madagascar; naturalized in Queensland
- Dactyloctenium hackelii - Socotra
- Dactyloctenium pilosum - Kenya, Aldabra, Seychelles, Madagascar
- Dactyloctenium radulans – buttongrass - Australia
- Dactyloctenium robecchii - Djibouti, Somalia, Socotra, Yemen, Oman
- Dactyloctenium scindicum - East Africa, Arabian Peninsula, Indian subcontinent; naturalized in Mexico

formerly included

see Acrachne, Eragrostis and Harpochloa

- Dactyloctenium falcatum – Harpochloa falx
- Dactyloctenium henrardianum – Acrachne henrardiana
- Dactyloctenium nitidum – Eragrostis nitida
- Dactyloctenium perrieri – Acrachne perrieri
- Dactyloctenium verticillatum – Acrachne racemosa
