= Falona =

Scientific classification
- Kingdom: Plantae
- Clade: Tracheophytes
- Clade: Angiosperms
- Clade: Monocots
- Clade: Commelinids
- Order: Poales
- Family: Poaceae
- Subfamily: Pooideae
- Supertribe: Poodae
- Tribe: Poeae
- Subtribe: Cynosurinae
- Genus: Falona; Adans.

Genus of grasses

Falona is a genus of grasses. It includes four species native to the Mediterranean basin, Macaronesia, the Caucasus, Ukraine, and Western Asia to the western Himalayas.

== Species ==
Four species are accepted.

- Falona balansae (Coss. & Durieu) V.Jirásek & Chrtek
- Falona colorata (Lehm. ex Steud.) Röser, Tkach & Rasti
- Falona echinata (L.) Dumort.
- Falona juncea (Murb.) V.Jirásek & Chrtek
