= Ciliochloa =

Scientific classification
- Kingdom: Plantae
- Clade: Tracheophytes
- Clade: Angiosperms
- Clade: Monocots
- Clade: Commelinids
- Order: Poales
- Family: Poaceae
- Subfamily: Pooideae
- Supertribe: Poodae
- Tribe: Poeae
- Subtribe: Cynosurinae
- Genus: Ciliochloa; Röser, Tkach & Rasti

Genus of grasses

Ciliochloa is a genus of grasses. It includes four species native to Mediterranean Europe, North Africa, and Western Asia from the Levant to Turkmenistan.

- Ciliochloa effusa (Link) Röser, Tkach & Rasti
- Ciliochloa elegans (Desf.) Röser, Tkach & Rasti
- Ciliochloa gracilis (Viv.) Röser, Tkach & Rasti
- Ciliochloa turcomanica (Proskur.) Röser, Tkach & Rasti
