= Dactyloctenium hackelii =

Conservation status
- Data Deficient (IUCN 3.1)

Scientific classification
- Kingdom: Plantae
- Clade: Embryophytes
- Clade: Tracheophytes
- Clade: Spermatophytes
- Clade: Angiosperms
- Clade: Monocots
- Clade: Commelinids
- Order: Poales
- Family: Poaceae
- Subfamily: Chloridoideae
- Genus: Dactyloctenium
- Species: D. hackelii

Binomial name
- Dactyloctenium hackelii J.Wagner & Vierh. (1903)

Species of grass

Dactyloctenium hackelii is a species of grass in the family Poaceae. It is native to the islands of Socotra and Abd al Kuri in Yemen's Socotra Archipelago. It grows in sandy coastal grassland from sea level to 20 metres elevation.
