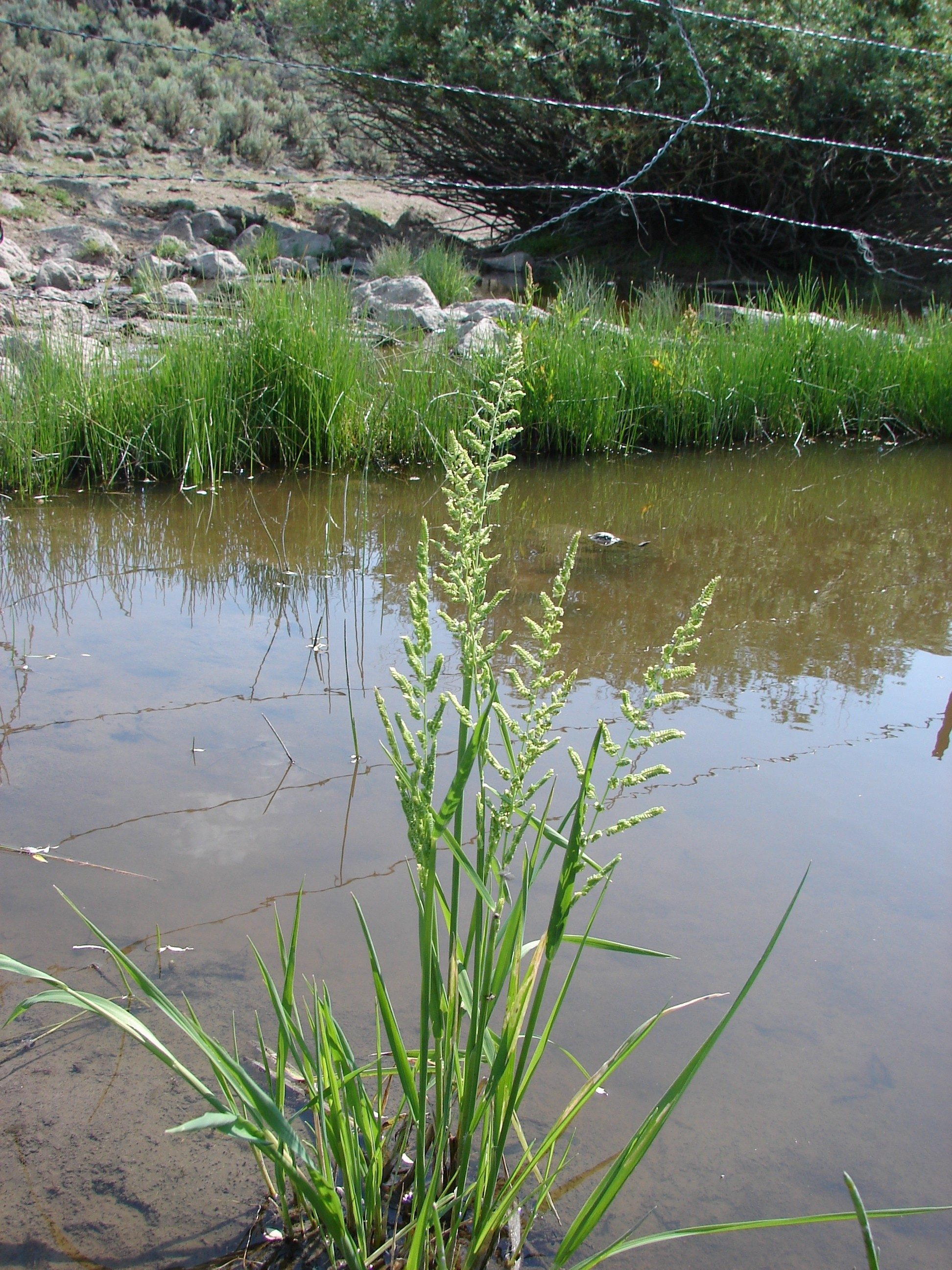

Scientific classification
- Kingdom: Plantae
- Clade: Tracheophytes
- Clade: Angiosperms
- Clade: Monocots
- Clade: Commelinids
- Order: Poales
- Family: Poaceae
- Subfamily: Pooideae
- Genus: Beckmannia
- Species: B. syzigachne

Binomial name
- Beckmannia syzigachne (Steud.) Fernald

Synonyms
- Beckmannia baicalensis Hultén; Beckmannia hirsutiflora (Roshev.) Prob.; Panicum syzigachne Steud.

= Beckmannia syzigachne =

Species of flowering plant

Beckmannia syzigachne, the American sloughgrass, or slough grass, is an annual or short-lived perennial bunchgrass in the grass family, Poaceae, found in shallow marshes or sloughs.

Beckmannia syzigachne is widespread across much of Europe, Asia, and North America.

Beckmannia syzigachne is one of only two species in the genus Beckmannia; the other being Beckmannia eruciformis.

== Genomics ==
A chromosome-level genome assembly of Beckmannia syzigachne was published in 2026. The genome size is approximately 3.19 Gb, with 90.3% of the assembly anchored to 7 chromosomes. The assembly has a BUSCO completeness of 97.1%, and 36,944 protein-coding genes were predicted.
