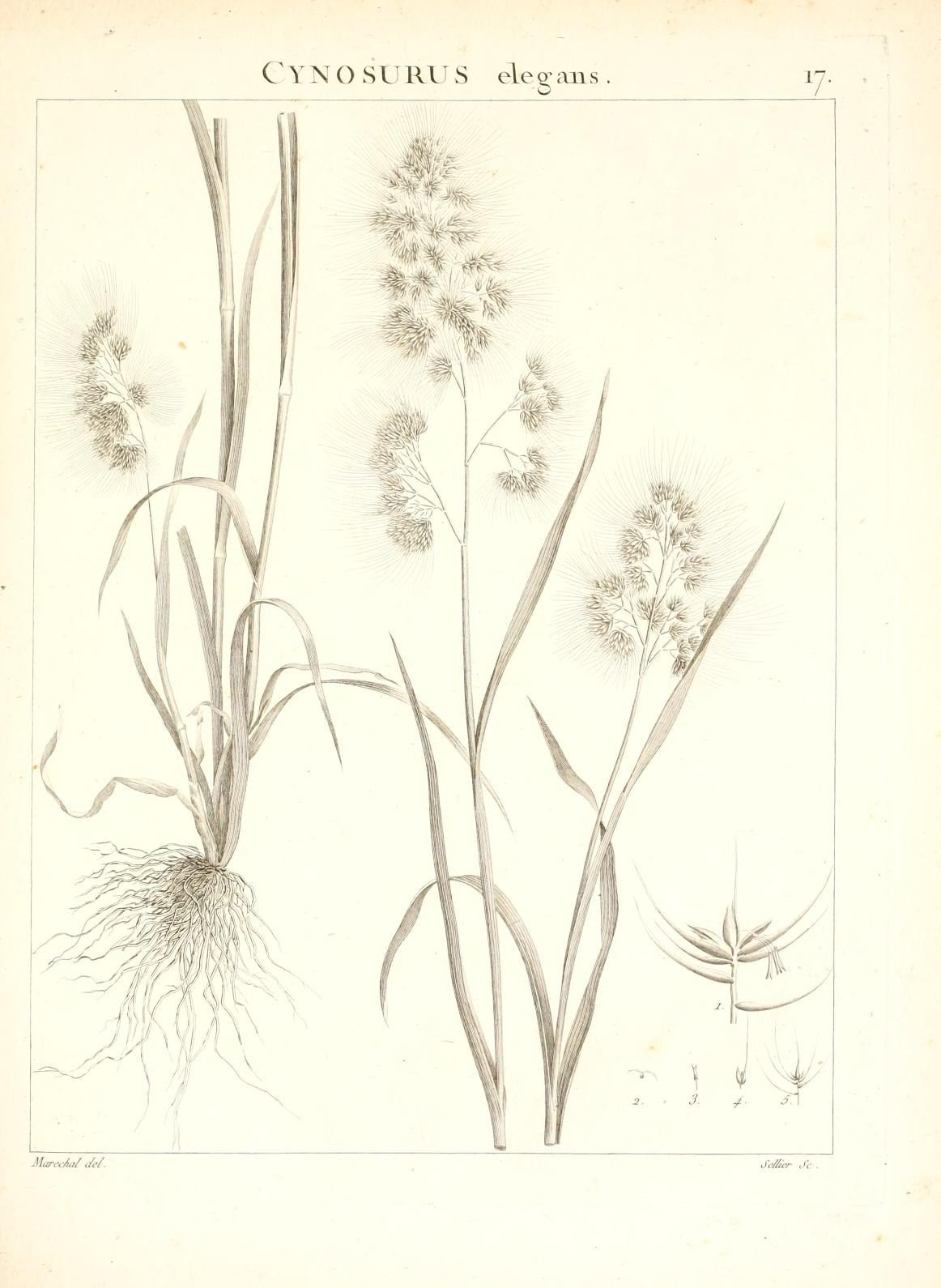
- Illustration of Cynosurus elegans.

Scientific classification
- Kingdom: Plantae
- Clade: Tracheophytes
- Clade: Angiosperms
- Clade: Monocots
- Clade: Commelinids
- Order: Poales
- Family: Poaceae
- Subfamily: Pooideae
- Genus: Cynosurus
- Species: C. elegans

Binomial name
- Cynosurus elegans Desf., 1798

Subspecies
- Cynosurus elegans elegans; Cynosurus elegans gracilis Desf.; Cynosurus elegans obliquatus (Link) Batt & Trabut; Cynosurus elegans polybracteatus

Synonyms
- Chrysurus paradoxus Sommier; Chrysurus gracilis (Viv.) Moris; Chrysurus elegans (Desf.) P.Beauv.; Chrysurus effusus (Link) P.Beauv.

= Cynosurus elegans =

Species of grass

Cynosurus elegans is a species of grass in the genus Cynosurus. It is found in southern Europe, north Africa, Middle East and Turkmenistan.
