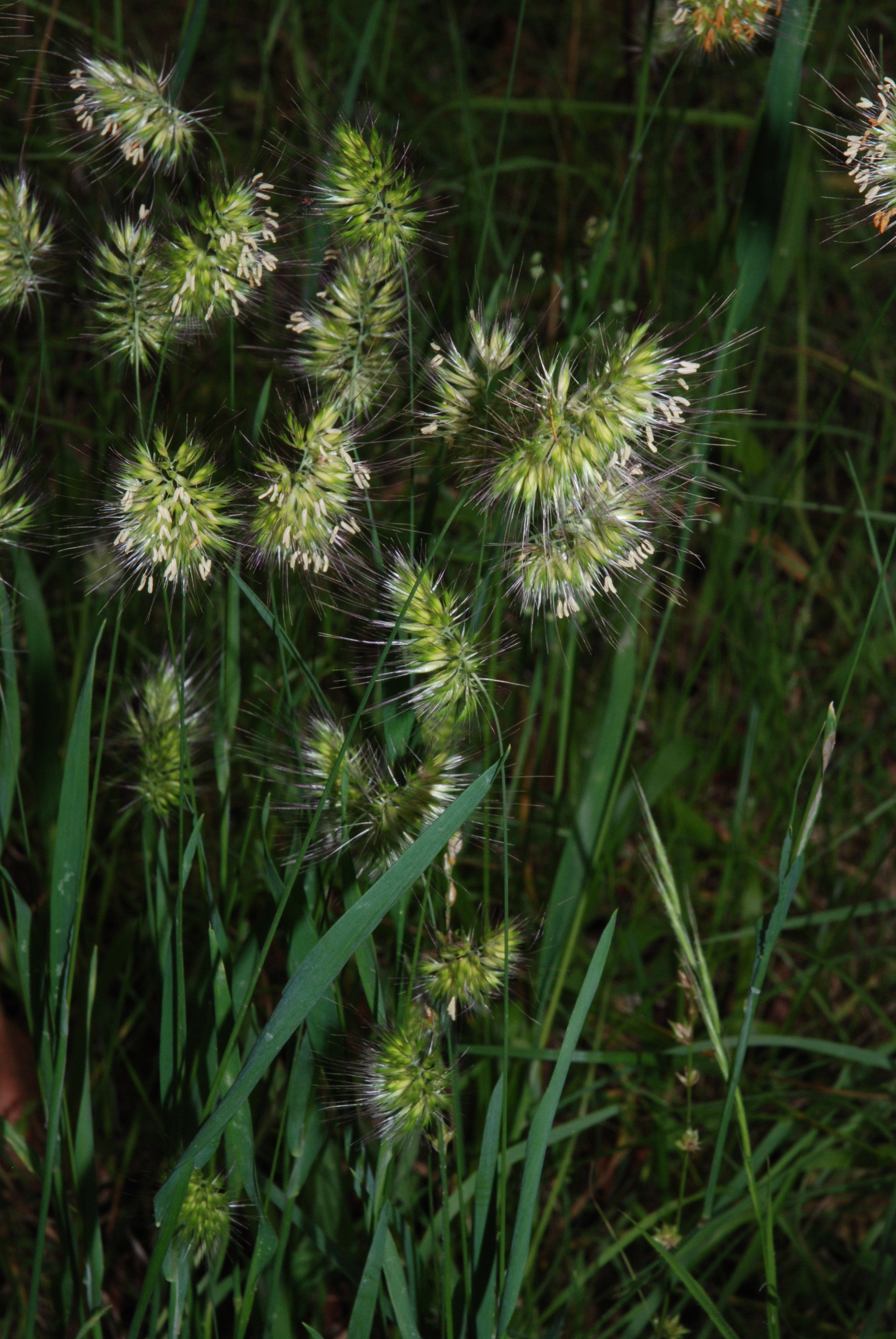

Scientific classification
- Kingdom: Plantae
- Clade: Tracheophytes
- Clade: Angiosperms
- Clade: Monocots
- Clade: Commelinids
- Order: Poales
- Family: Poaceae
- Subfamily: Pooideae
- Genus: Cynosurus
- Species: C. echinatus

Binomial name
- Cynosurus echinatus L.

= Cynosurus echinatus =

Species of grass

Cynosurus echinatus is a species of grass known by the common names bristly dogstail grass, rough dog's-tail and hedgehog dogtail. It is native to southern Europe, and it is known in the Americas and Australia as an introduced species and sometimes a noxious weed. An herbicide-resistant strain can be found growing as a weed in canola and wheat fields in Chile. This is an annual grass growing 10 to 50 centimeters tall. The inflorescence is a rounded or oval cluster or series of clusters of spikelets. The fertile spikelet has an awn up to a centimeter long. The awns clumped closely together into a tuft gives the inflorescence its bristly, hairy appearance.

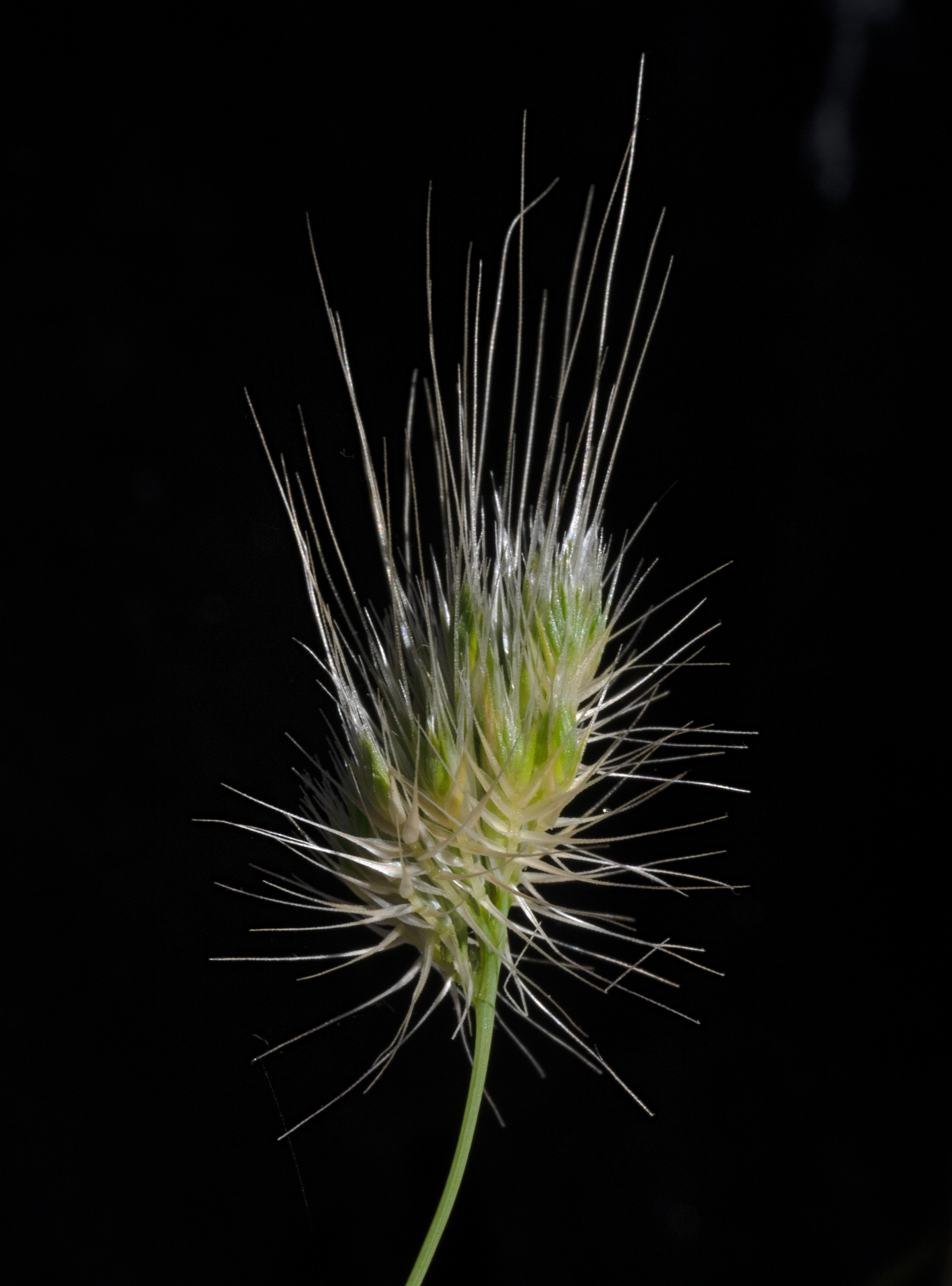
Cynosurus echinatus inflorescence
