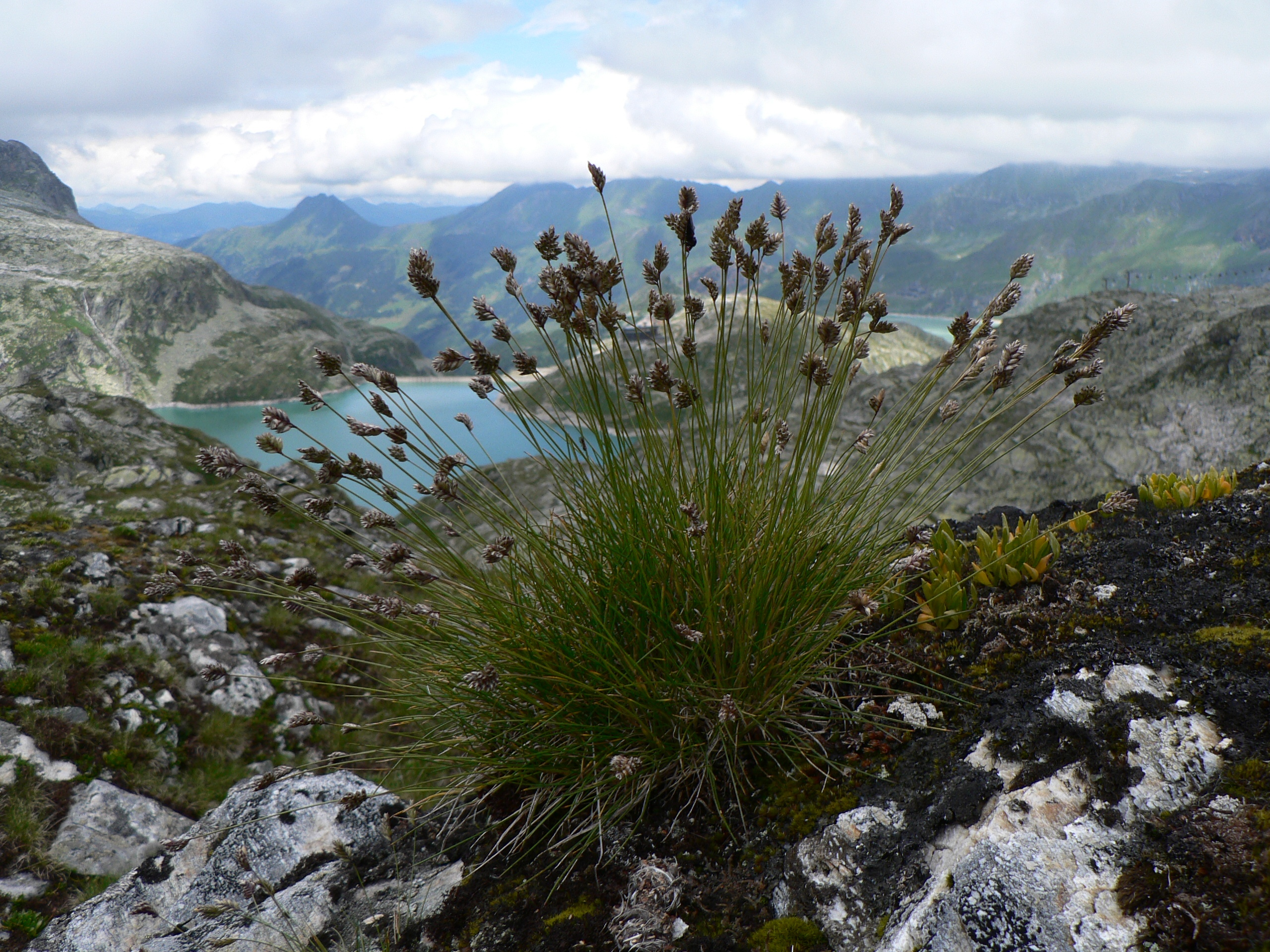
- Oreochloa disticha Hohe Tauern in Austria
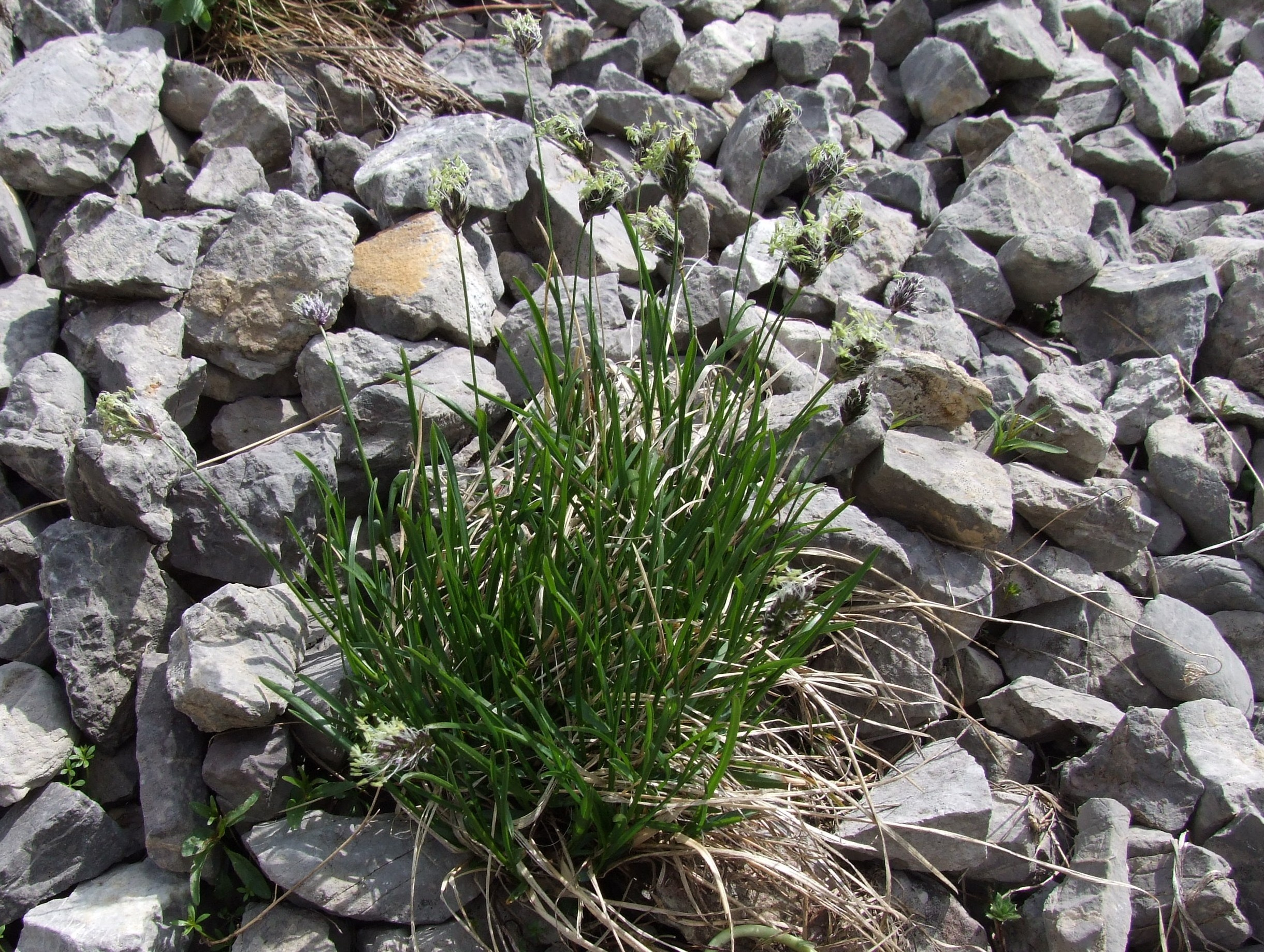

Scientific classification
- Kingdom: Plantae
- Clade: Embryophytes
- Clade: Tracheophytes
- Clade: Spermatophytes
- Clade: Angiosperms
- Clade: Monocots
- Clade: Commelinids
- Order: Poales
- Family: Poaceae
- Subfamily: Pooideae
- Supertribe: Poodae
- Tribe: Poeae
- Subtribe: Sesleriinae
- Genus: Oreochloa; Link

Type species
- Oreochloa disticha (Wulfen) Link

= Oreochloa =

Genus of grasses

Oreochloa is a genus of European plants in the grass family.

Species

- Oreochloa blanka Deyl - Pyrenees of Spain + France + Andorra
- Oreochloa confusa (Coincy) Rouy - Spain
- Oreochloa disticha (Wulfen) Link - France, Switzerland, Germany, Austria, Poland, Czech Republic, Romania, Slovenia, Slovakia, Serbia, Croatia, Ukraine, Moldova
- Oreochloa elegans Sennen - Pyrenees of Spain + France + Andorra
- Oreochloa seslerioides (All.) K.Richt. - French Pyrenees + French Alps
