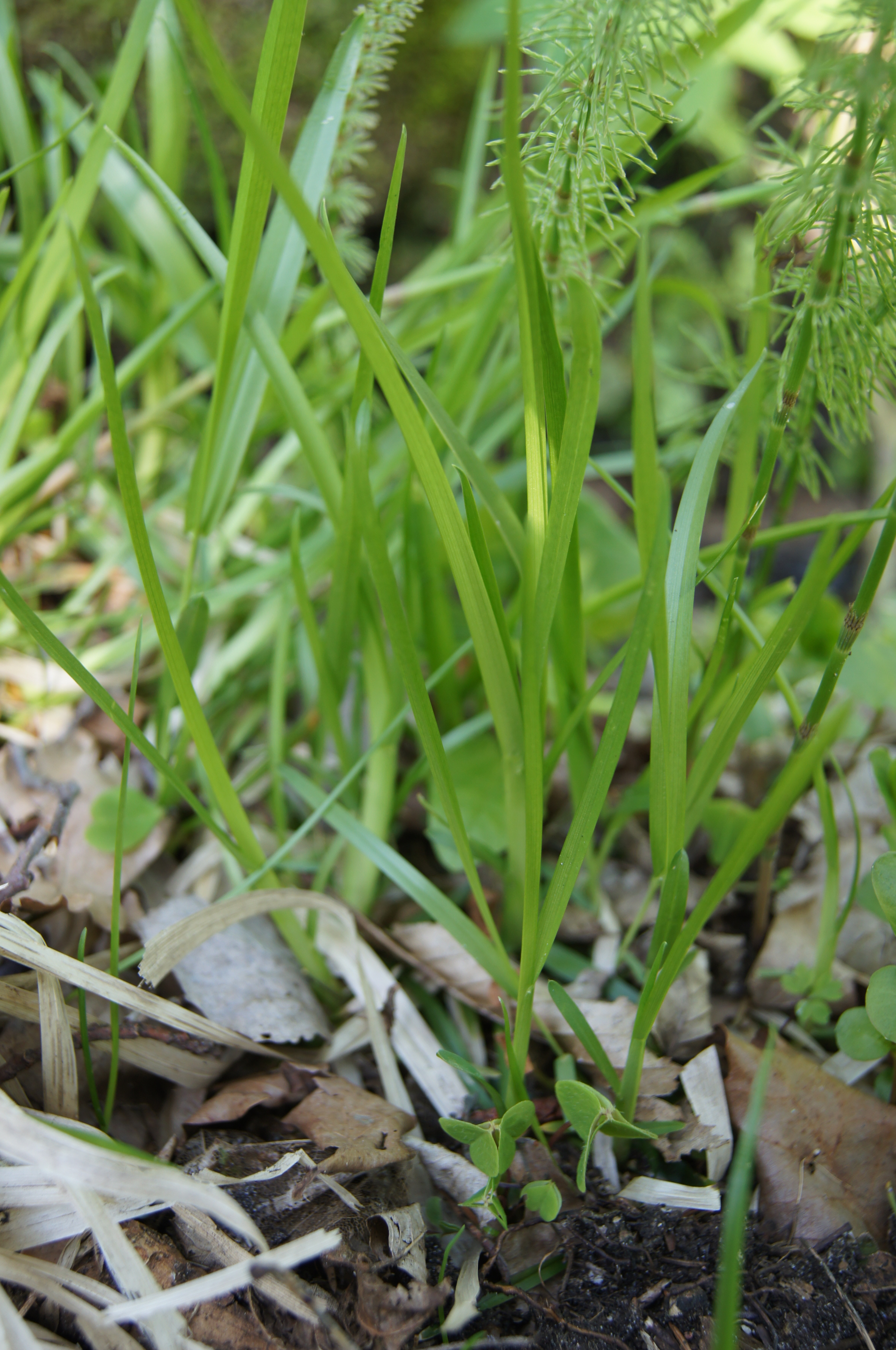

Scientific classification
- Kingdom: Plantae
- Clade: Tracheophytes
- Clade: Angiosperms
- Clade: Monocots
- Clade: Commelinids
- Order: Poales
- Family: Poaceae
- Subfamily: Pooideae
- Genus: Poa
- Species: P. remota

Binomial name
- Poa remota Forselles

= Poa remota =

Species of grass

Poa remota is a species of grass in the family Poaceae.

Its native range is Europe to China and Caucasus.
