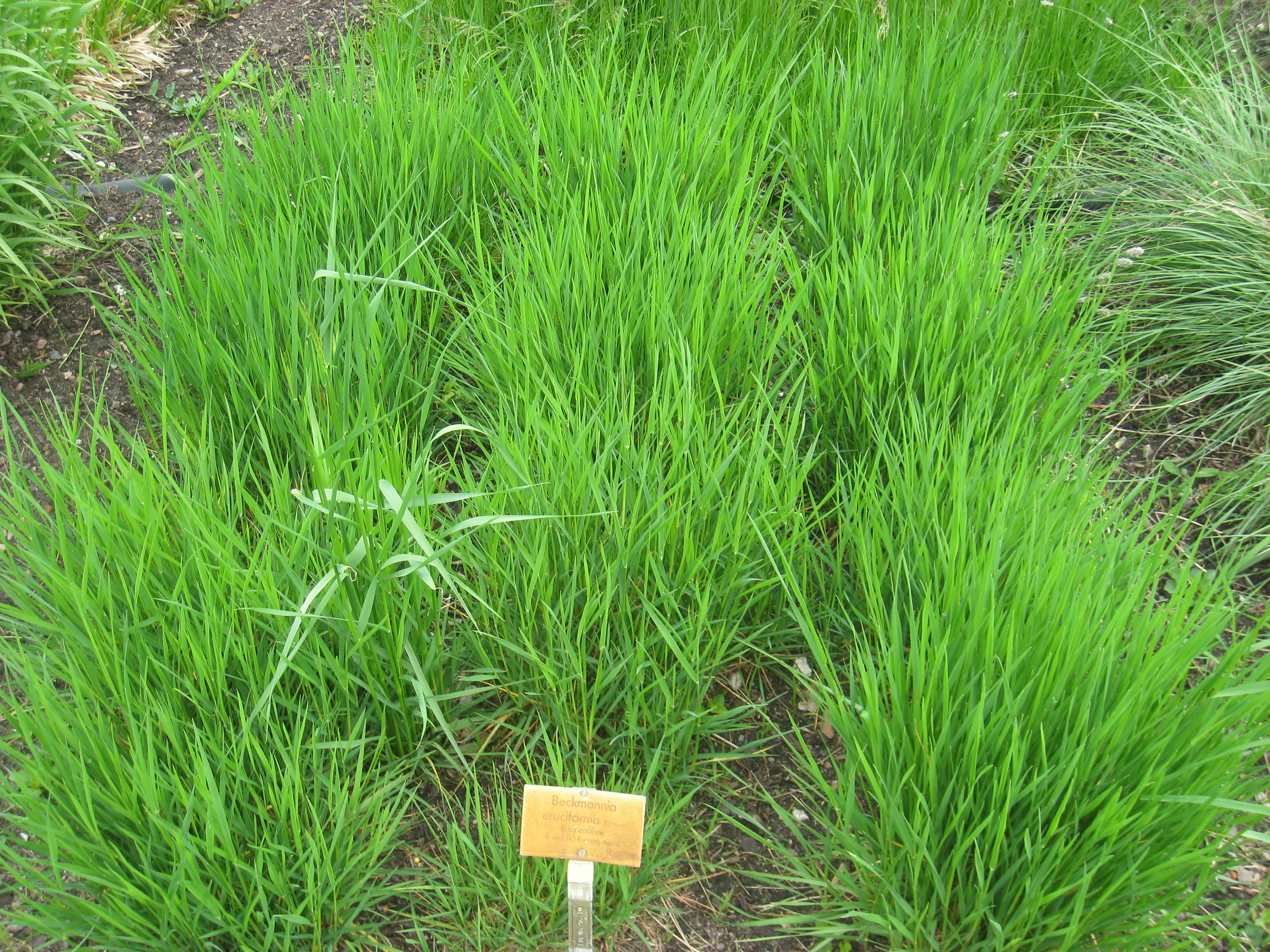

Scientific classification
- Kingdom: Plantae
- Clade: Tracheophytes
- Clade: Angiosperms
- Clade: Monocots
- Clade: Commelinids
- Order: Poales
- Family: Poaceae
- Subfamily: Pooideae
- Genus: Beckmannia
- Species: B. eruciformis

Binomial name
- Beckmannia eruciformis (L.) Host

= Beckmannia eruciformis =

Species of grass

Beckmannia eruciformis, the European slough-grass or slough grass, is an annual or short lived perennial in the grass family, Poaceae, found in shallow marshes or sloughs, and used for animal fodder and forage.

== Distribution ==
This species is native in Western Asia, Turkey through Siberia, Kazakhstan, Southeastern Europe, Eastern Europe, and Central Europe.

It is one of only two species in the genus Beckmannia; the other being Beckmannia syzigachne.
