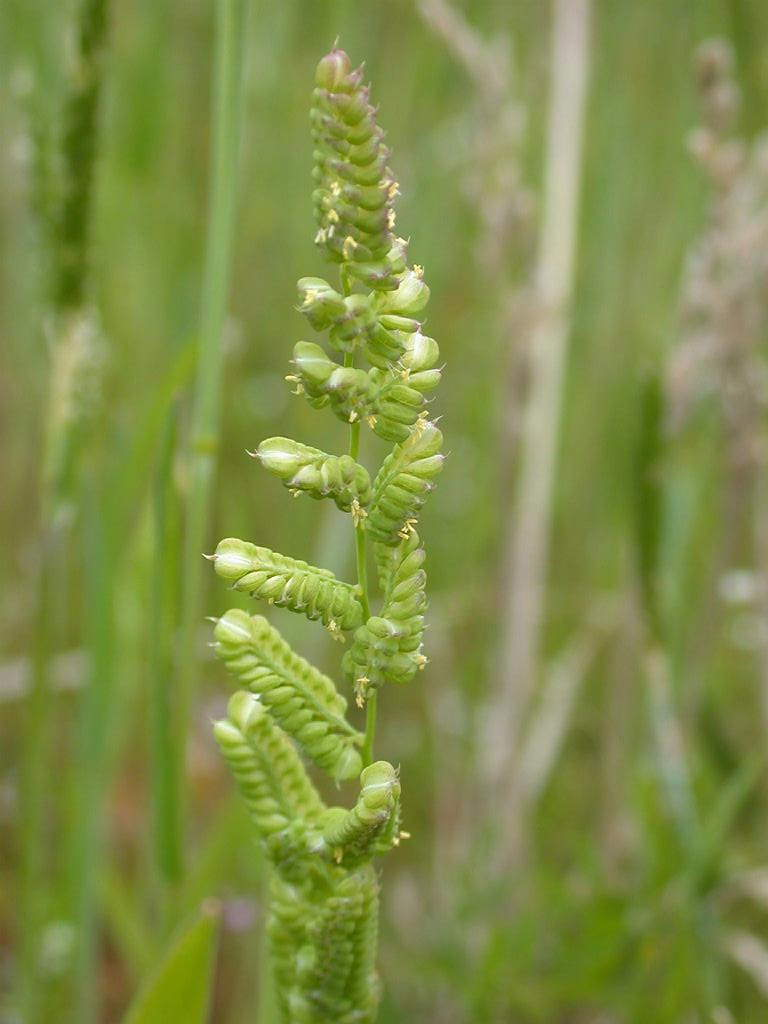
- Beckmannia syzigachne

Scientific classification
- Kingdom: Plantae
- Clade: Tracheophytes
- Clade: Angiosperms
- Clade: Monocots
- Clade: Commelinids
- Order: Poales
- Family: Poaceae
- Subfamily: Pooideae
- Supertribe: Poodae
- Tribe: Poeae
- Subtribe: Beckmanniinae
- Genus: Beckmannia; Host

Species
- Beckmannia eruciformis Beckmannia syzigachne

= Beckmannia =

Genus of grasses

Beckmannia is a small genus of grasses containing two species known generally as sloughgrass. Beckmannia eruciformis is an Eurasian perennial, and Beckmannia syzigachne is an annual grass found in North America and Asia. The genus was named for the German scientist Johann Beckmann.

== Genomics ==
A chromosome-level genome assembly of Beckmannia syzigachne was published in 2026, representing a high-quality reference genome for the genus. The genome is approximately 3.19 Gb in size, with 90.3% of the assembly anchored to 7 chromosomes. The assembly has a BUSCO completeness of 97.1%, and 36,944 protein-coding genes were predicted.

== See also ==
- List of Poaceae genera
