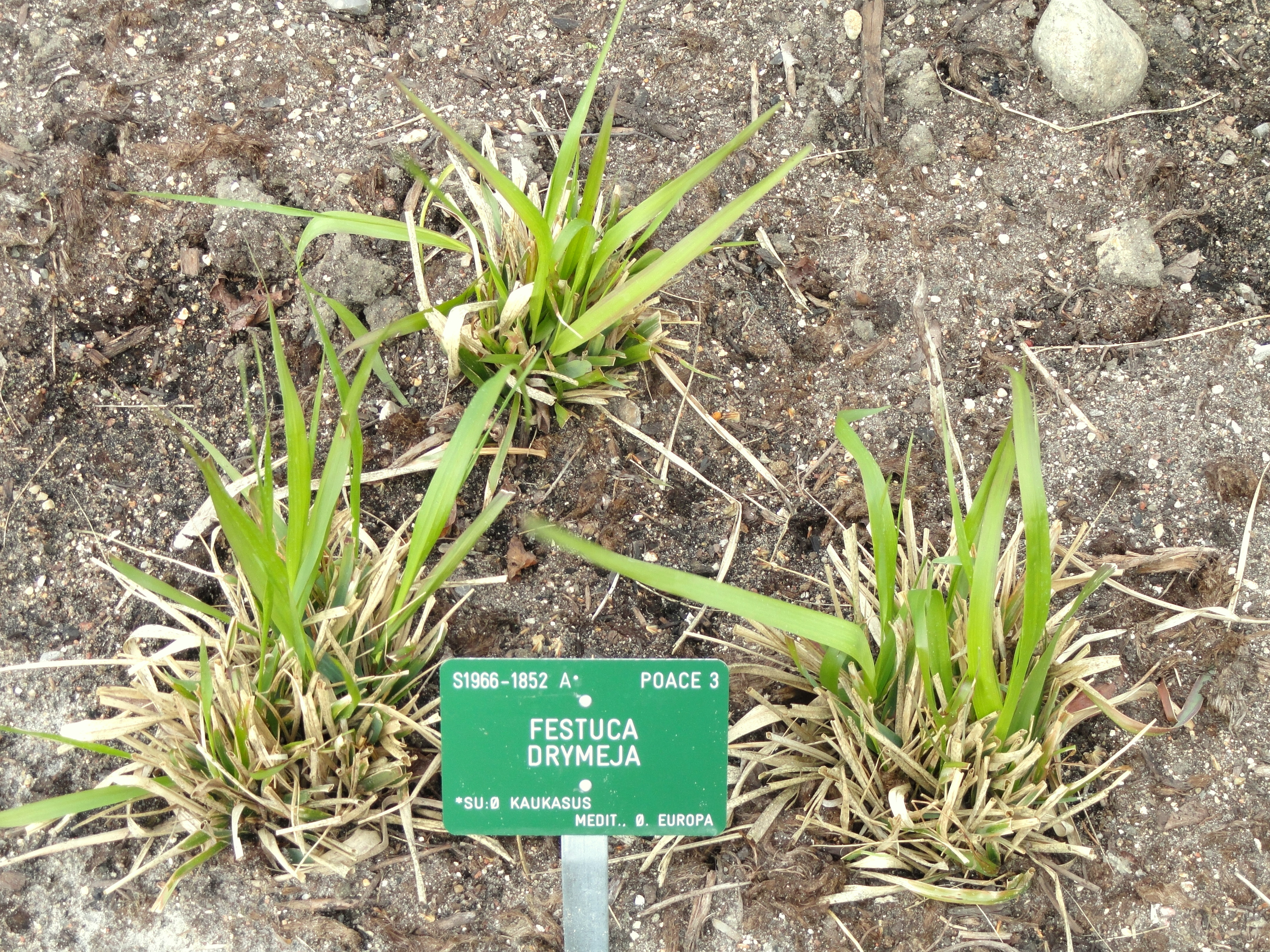

Scientific classification
- Kingdom: Plantae
- Clade: Tracheophytes
- Clade: Angiosperms
- Clade: Monocots
- Clade: Commelinids
- Order: Poales
- Family: Poaceae
- Subfamily: Pooideae
- Genus: Festuca
- Species: F. drymeja

Binomial name
- Festuca drymeja Mert. & W.D.J.Koch

Synonyms
- see text

= Festuca drymeja =

Species of grass

Festuca drymeja is a species of grass in the family Poaceae. This species is native to Albania, Algeria, Austria, Bulgaria, Czechoslovakia, Greece, Hungary, Iran, Italy, Morocco, North Caucasus, Poland, Romania, Sicilia, Transcaucasus, Tunisia, Turkey, Turkey-in-Europe, Ukraine, and Yugoslavia. Its perennial and prefers temperate biomes. Festuca drymeja was first described in 1823.

== List of synonyms ==
synonyms:

- Drymochloa drymeja (Mert. & W.D.J.Koch) Holub in Folia Geobot. Phytotax. 19: 99 (1984)
- Schedonorus montanus Opiz in Seznam: 89 (1852)
- Brachypodium tenellum Roem. & Schult. in Syst. Veg. ed. 15[bis]. 2: 745 (1817), nom. illeg.
- Drymochloa drymeja subsp. exaltata (C.Presl) Foggi & Signorini in Willdenowia 35: 242 (2005)
- Drymochloa grandis (Coss. & Durieu) Holub in Preslia 70: 104 (1998)
- Drymochloa lasto (Boiss.) Holub in Preslia 70: 104 (1998)
- Festuca altissima Boiss. in Elench. Pl. Nov.: 92 (1838), nom. illeg.
- Festuca boissieri Janka in Oesterr. Bot. Z. 14: 341 (1864), nom. illeg.
- Festuca boissieri var. yvesii Cebolla & Rivas Ponce in Fontqueria 33: 18 (1992)
- Festuca drymeja subsp. exaltata (C.Presl) Asch. & Graebn. in Syn. Mitteleur. Fl. 2(1): 535 (1900)
- Festuca drymeja var. grandis Coss. & Durieu in M.C.Durieu de Maisonneuve, Expl. Sci. Algérie 2: 297 (1868)
- Festuca drymeja f. lucorum (Schur) Beldie in T.Săvulescu, Fl. Republ. Socialist. România 12: 476 (1972)
- Festuca drymeja f. timpae Morariu ex Beldie in T.Săvulescu, Fl. Republ. Socialist. România 12: 790 (1972)
- Festuca exaltata C.Presl in Fl. Sicul.: xlv (1826)
- Festuca grandis (Coss. & Durieu) Trab. in J.A.Battandier & L.C.Trabut, Fl. Algérie, Monocot.: 216 (1895)
- Festuca lasto Boiss. in Not. Abies Pinsapo: 12 (1838)
- Festuca lucorum Schur in Enum. Pl. Transsilv.: 797 (1866)
- Festuca montana M.Bieb. in Fl. Taur.-Caucas. 3: 75 (1819), nom. illeg.
- Festuca montana var. altissima Batt. & Trab. in E.Bonnet & G.Barratte, Expl. Sci. Tunisie, Cat. Pl.: 479 (1896)
- Festuca montana subsp. grandis (Coss. & Durieu) Trab. in J.A.Battandier & L.C.Trabut, Fl. Algérie, Monocot.: 218 (1895)
- Festuca montana var. grandis (Coss. & Durieu) St.-Yves in Candollea 1: 47 (1922)
- Poa bakuensis Litv. in V.L.Komarov (ed.), Fl. URSS 2: 753 (1934)
- Poa banatica Kit. in Linnaea 32: 311 (1864), nom. nud.
- Poa bannatica Willd. ex Steud. in Nomencl. Bot., ed. 2, 2: 358 (1841), pro syn.
- Schedonorus exaltatus (C.Presl) Schult. & Schult.f. in Mant. 3: 644 (1827)
