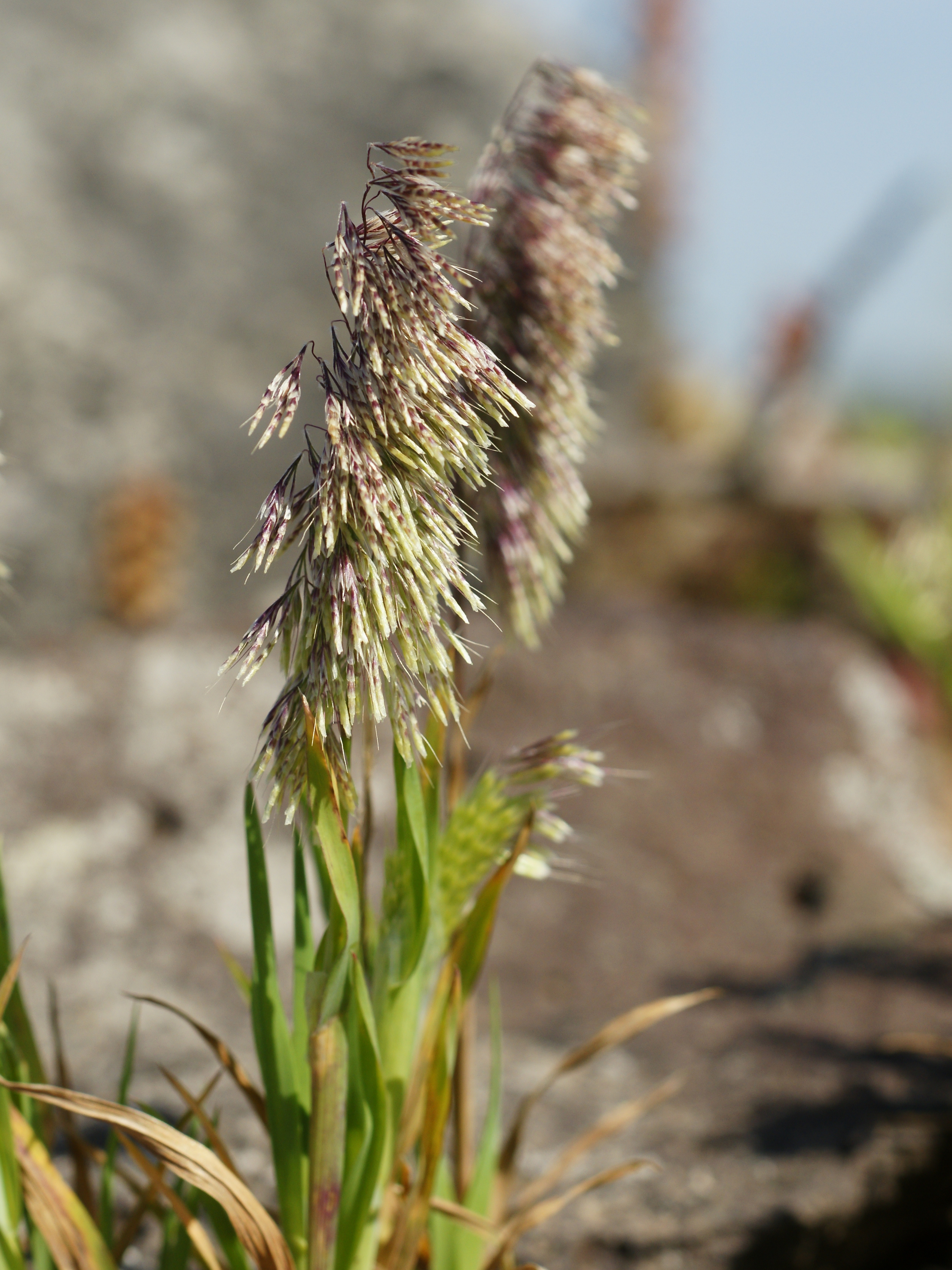

Scientific classification
- Kingdom: Plantae
- Clade: Tracheophytes
- Clade: Angiosperms
- Clade: Monocots
- Clade: Commelinids
- Order: Poales
- Family: Poaceae
- Subfamily: Pooideae
- Supertribe: Poodae
- Tribe: Poeae
- Subtribe: Dactylidinae
- Genus: Lamarckia; Moench, conserved spelling, not Vahl 1810 (Solanaceae)
- Species: L. aurea

Binomial name
- Lamarckia aurea (L.) Moench

Synonyms
- Lamarkia Moench. alternate spelling; Tinaea Garzia; Achyrodes Ludw.; Chrysurus Pers.; Pterium Desv.; Cynosurus aureus L.; Chrysurus cynosuroides Pers.; Chrysurus aureus (L.) Besser; Achyrodes aureum (L.) Kuntze; Pterium elegans Desv.; Tinaea elegans Garzia ex Parl.; Lamarckia hookeriana Griff.

= Lamarckia =

Species of grass

Lamarckia is a genus of plants in the grass family native to the Old World Dry Belt, on the Mediterranean Region, the Arabian Peninsula, East Africa and South Asia. It has a single species, Lamarckia aurea, known colloquially as the golden dog's-tail or goldentop grass.

== Description ==
It is an annual plant, typically 30-45 centimetres in height, with clusters of golden flowers in a panicle 5–8 cm long and 2–2.5 cm broad.

== Distribution ==
The species is native to the Mediterranean Basin and neighboring regions from Portugal to the Canary Islands east to Ethiopia and northern India. It is also naturalized in parts of Australia and the Americas, considered an invasive weed in some areas.

== Formerly included ==
see Aegopogon

- Lamarckia tenella - Aegopogon tenellus

== See also ==
- Jepson Manual Treatment
- Grass Manual Treatment
- Photo gallery
