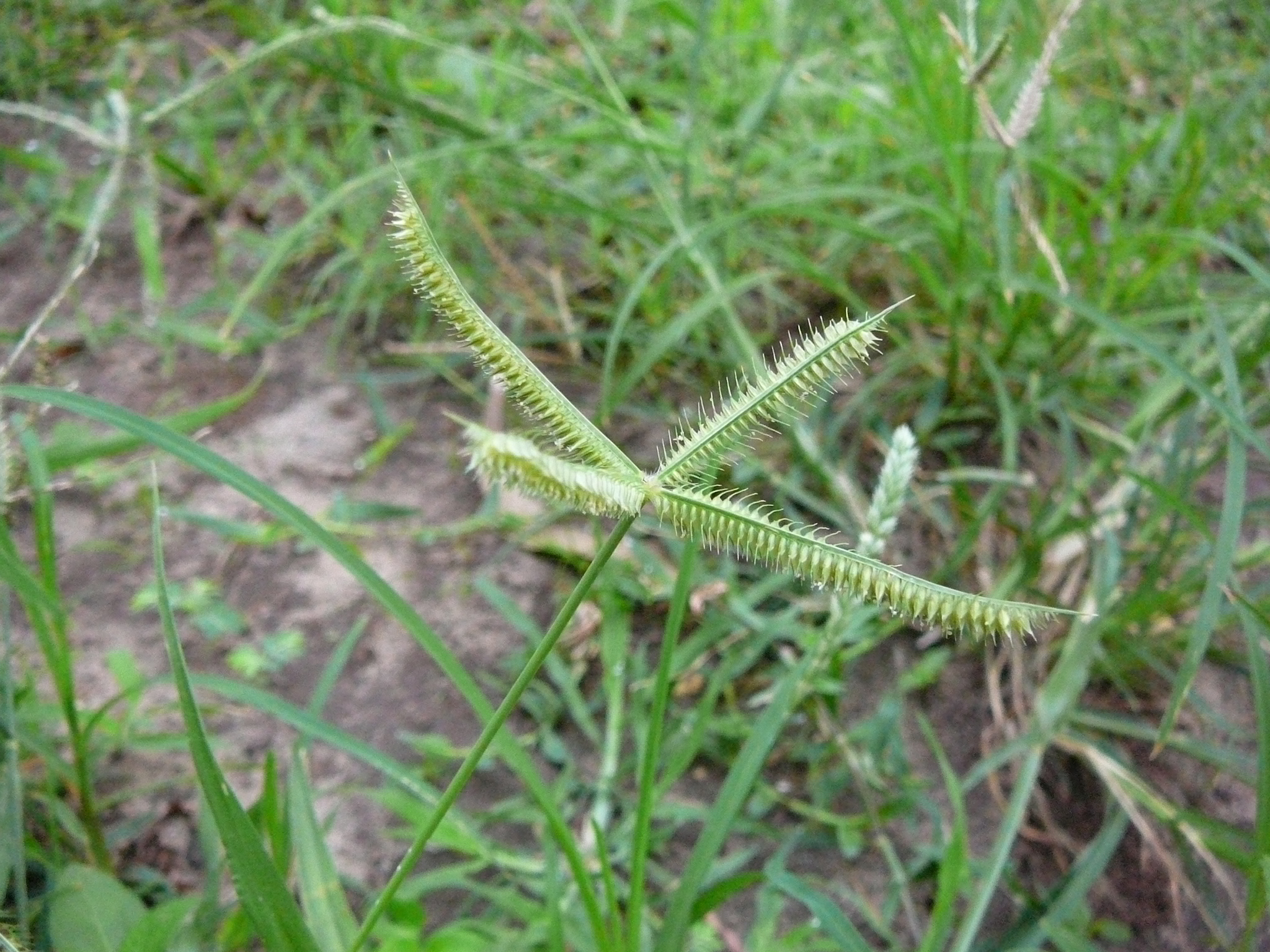

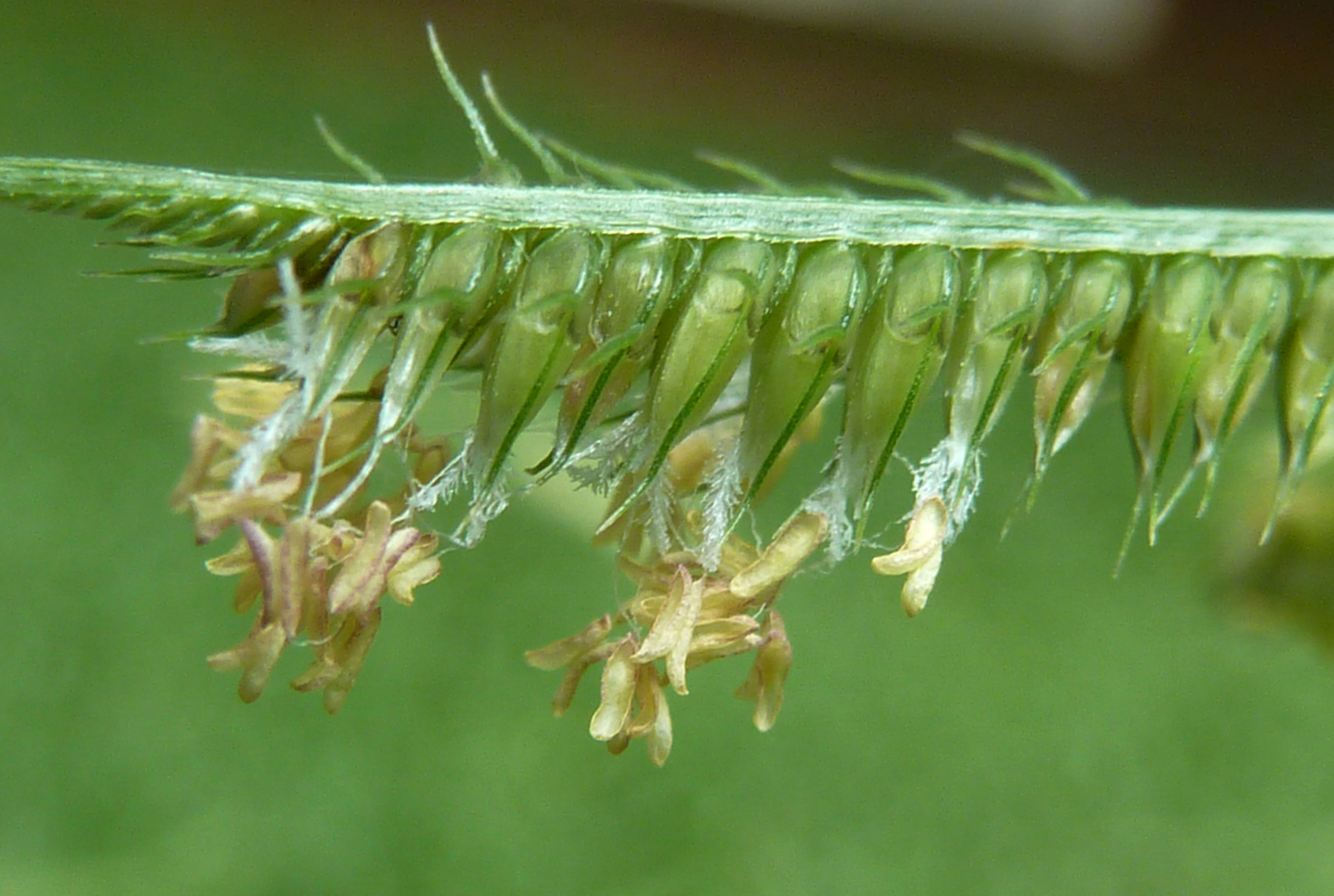

Scientific classification
- Kingdom: Plantae
- Clade: Tracheophytes
- Clade: Angiosperms
- Clade: Monocots
- Clade: Commelinids
- Order: Poales
- Family: Poaceae
- Subfamily: Chloridoideae
- Genus: Dactyloctenium
- Species: D. aegyptium

Binomial name
- Dactyloctenium aegyptium (L.) Willd.

= Dactyloctenium aegyptium =

Species of grass

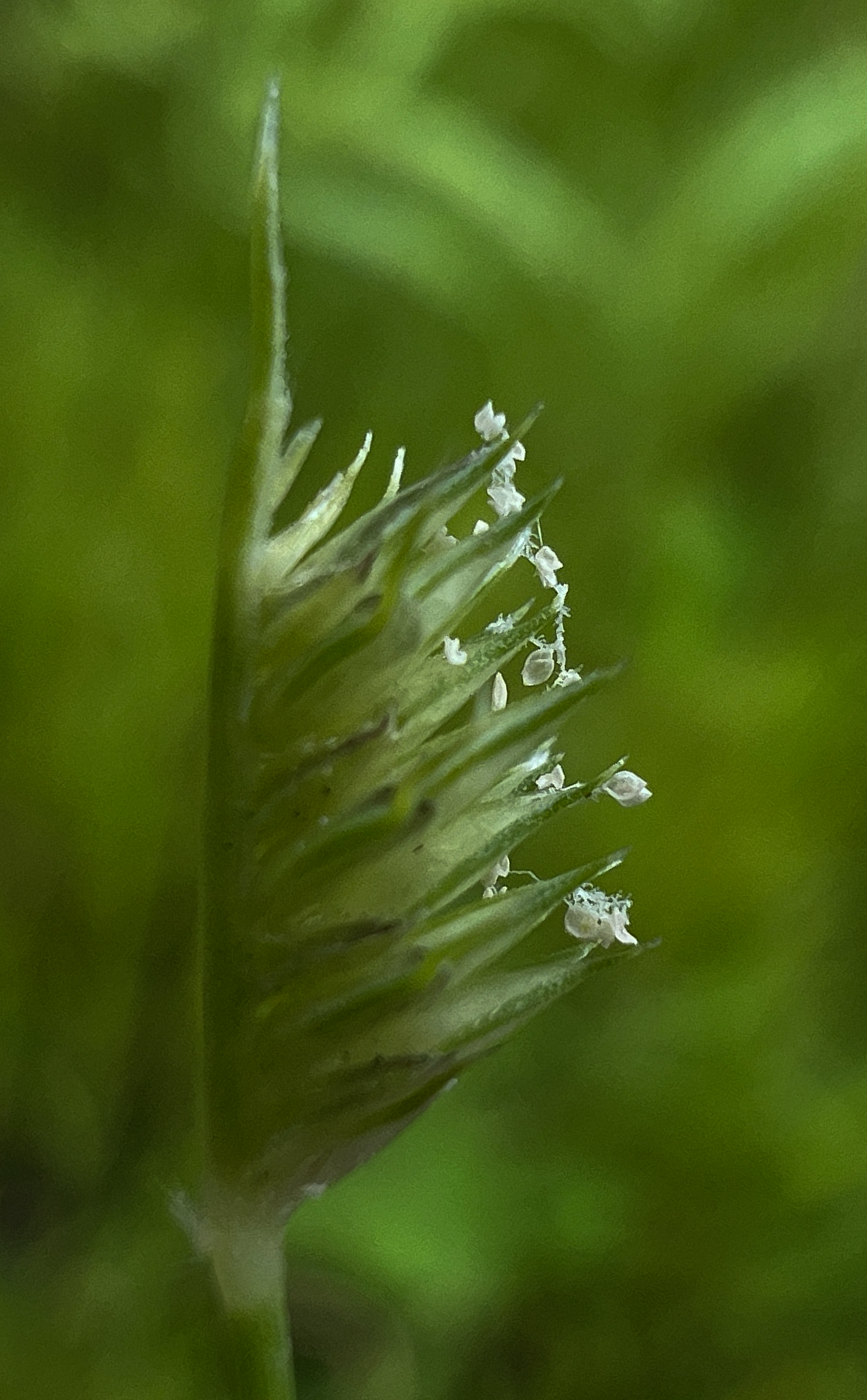
Dactyloctenium aegyptium (L.) Willd.

Dactyloctenium aegyptium, or Egyptian crowfoot grass is a member of the family Poaceae native to Africa and Asia. The plant mostly grows in heavy soils at damp sites.

== Description ==
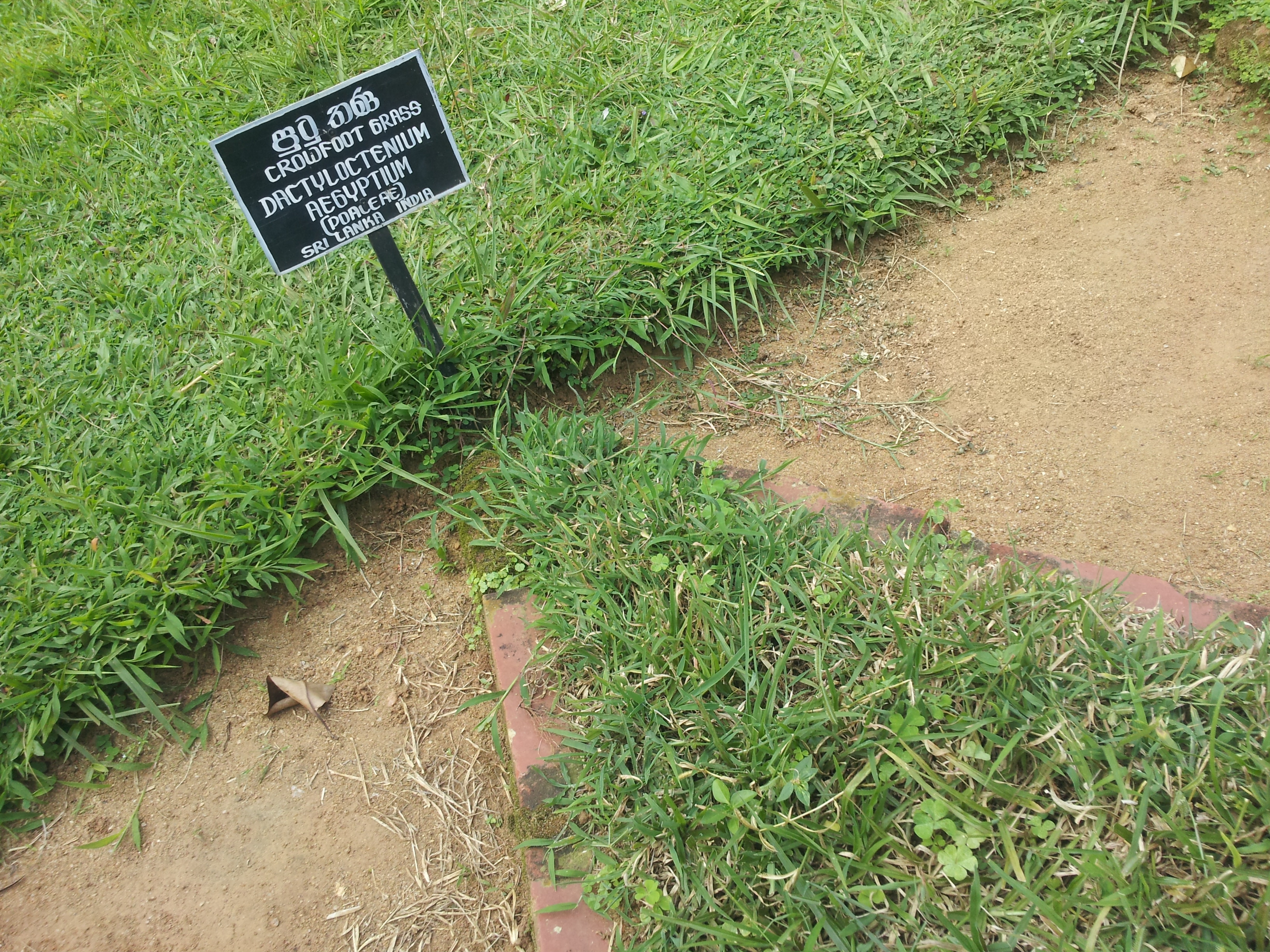
at Peradeniya Royal Botanical Garden

This grass creeps and has a straight shoot which are usually about 30 centimeters tall.

== Food ==
Dactyloctenium aegyptium is still a traditional food plant used as a famine food in Africa, this little-known grain has potential to improve nutrition, boost food security, foster rural development and support sustainable landcare.

== Invasive species ==
In other areas of the world, including parts of the United States, the grass is considered a weed and invasive species.
