= Oreochloa disticha =

Scientific classification
- Kingdom: Plantae
- Clade: Tracheophytes
- Clade: Angiosperms
- Clade: Monocots
- Clade: Commelinids
- Order: Poales
- Family: Poaceae
- Subfamily: Pooideae
- Genus: Oreochloa
- Species: O. disticha

Binomial name
- Oreochloa disticha (Wulfen) Link

Synonyms
- Poa disticha Wulfen; Sesleria disticha (Wulfen) Pers.; Cynosurus distichus Hoffm.; Sesleria disticha var. flavescens Asch. & Graebn.

Species of flowering plant

Oreochloa disticha is a species of grass native to Central Europe and Ukraine.
