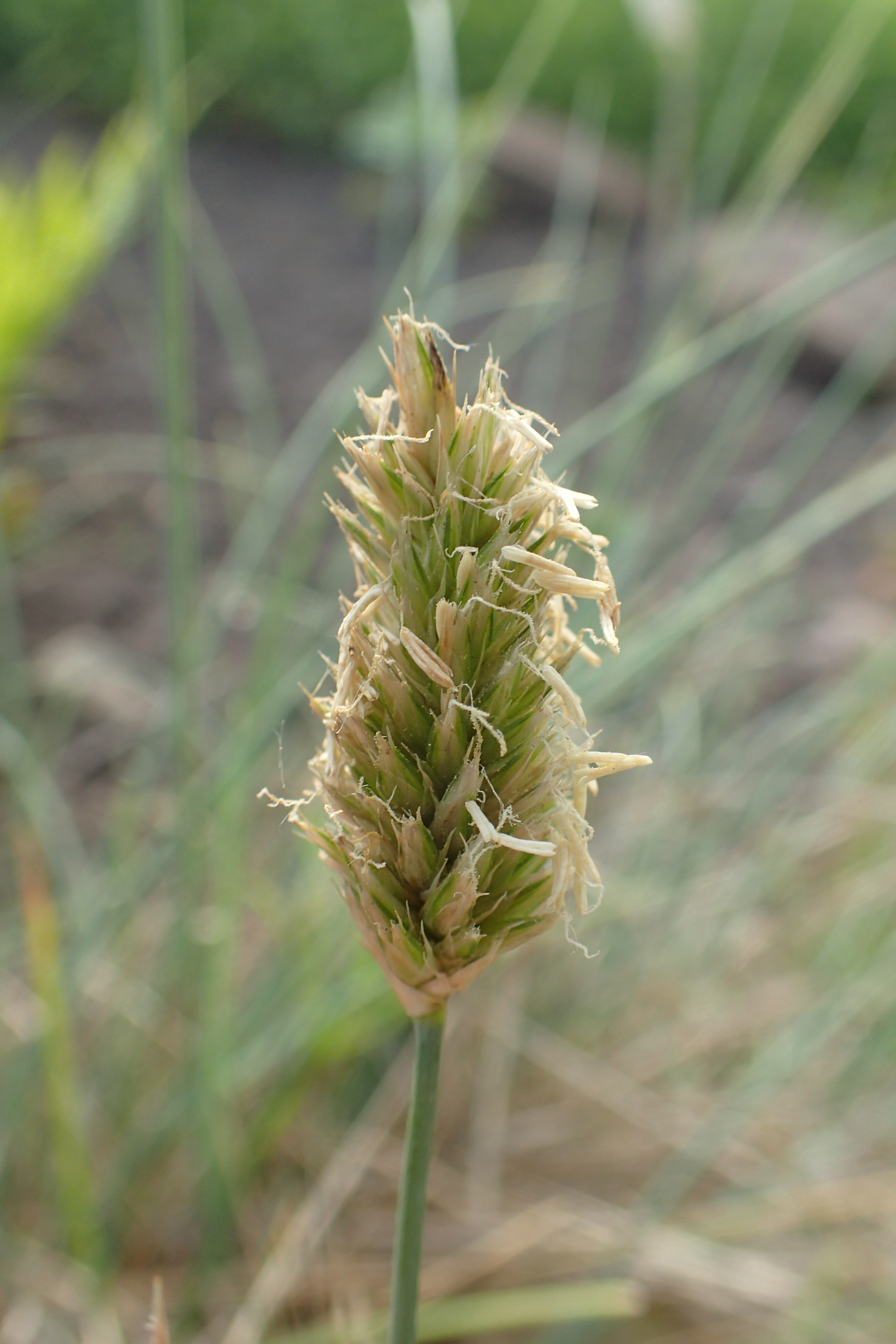

Scientific classification
- Kingdom: Plantae
- Clade: Tracheophytes
- Clade: Angiosperms
- Clade: Monocots
- Clade: Commelinids
- Order: Poales
- Family: Poaceae
- Subfamily: Pooideae
- Genus: Sesleria
- Species: S. argentea

Binomial name
- Sesleria argentea (L.) Ard.

= Sesleria argentea =

Species of grass

Sesleria argentea is a species of perennial grass in the family Poaceae. It is 35–55 centimetres (14–22 in) long with a 0.5–1 millimetre (0.020–0.039 in) long ciliolate membrane. Its leaves are either conduplicate or convolute, and are 10–20 centimetres (3.9–7.9 in) long and 3–5 millimetres (0.12–0.20 in) wide. It also has a linear panicle spiciform which is 3.5–5.5 centimetres (1.4–2.2 in) long and 0.5–0.7 centimetres (0.20–0.28 in) wide.
