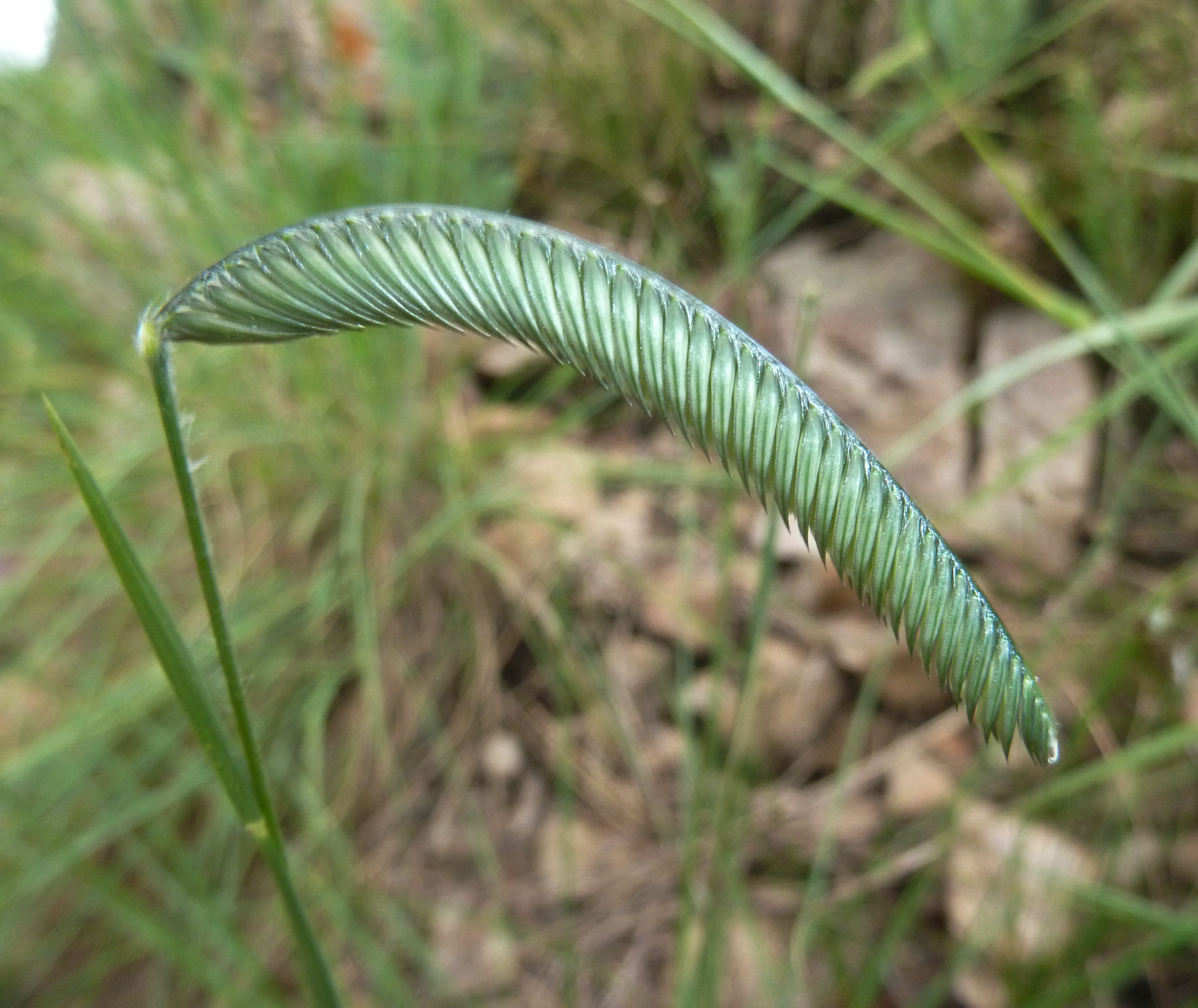
- Inflorescence of Harpochloa falx

Scientific classification
- Kingdom: Plantae
- Clade: Tracheophytes
- Clade: Angiosperms
- Clade: Monocots
- Clade: Commelinids
- Order: Poales
- Family: Poaceae
- Subfamily: Chloridoideae
- Tribe: Cynodonteae
- Subtribe: Eleusininae
- Genus: Harpochloa; Kunth

Type species
- Harpochloa capensis (syn of H. falx) Kunth

Synonyms
- Harpechloa Kunth, alternate spelling

= Harpochloa =

Caterpillar grass

Genus of grasses

Harpochloa is a genus of African plants in the grass family, common name caterpillar grass.

Species

- Harpochloa falx (L.f.) Kuntze - Eastern Cape, KwaZulu-Natal, Lesotho, Gauteng, Eswatini, Free State, Mpumalanga
- Harpochloa pseudoharpechloa (Chiov.) Clayton - Zaïre, Zambia, Angola

formerly included

see Microchloa

- Harpochloa altera - Microchloa altera
