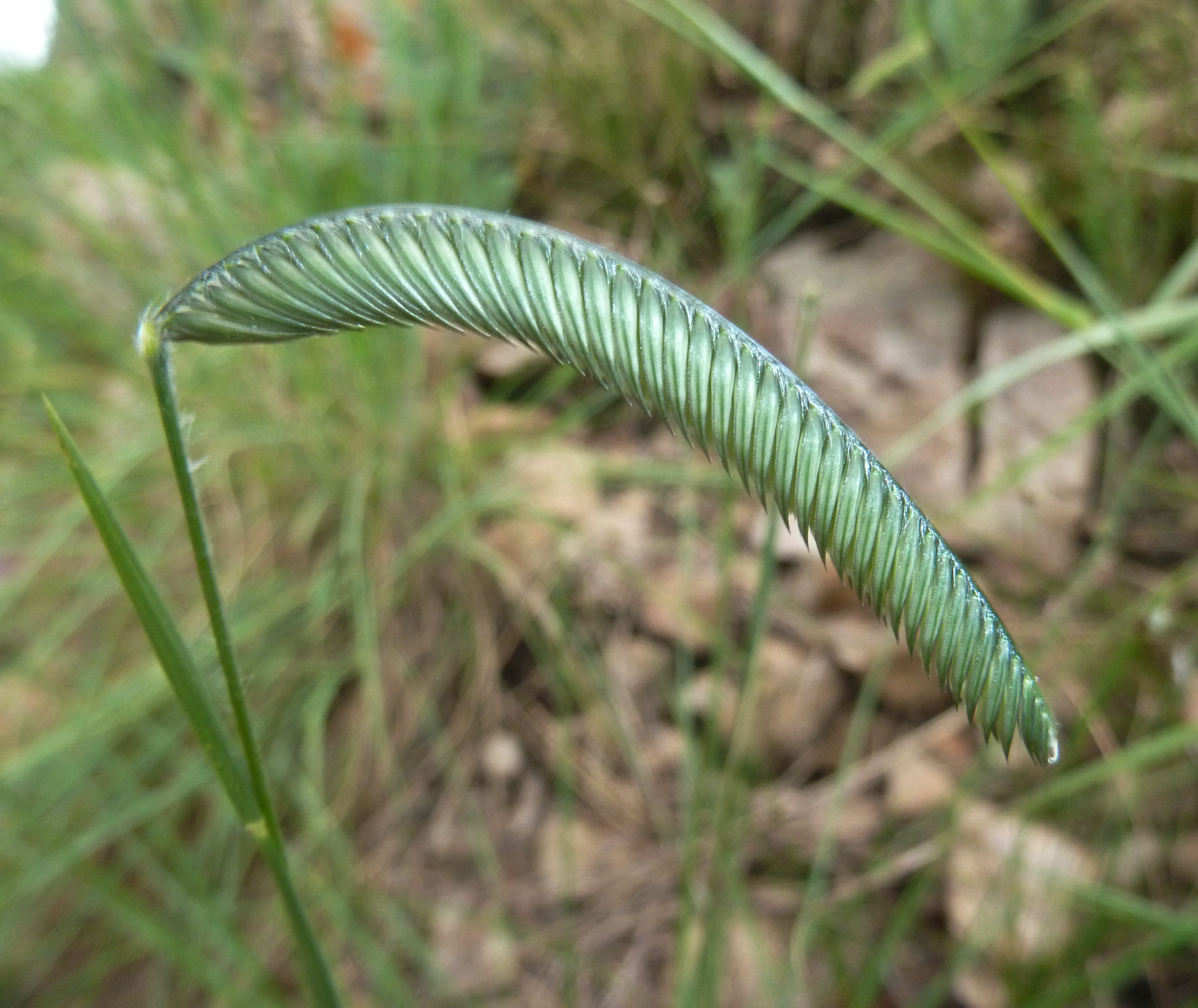
- Inflorescence
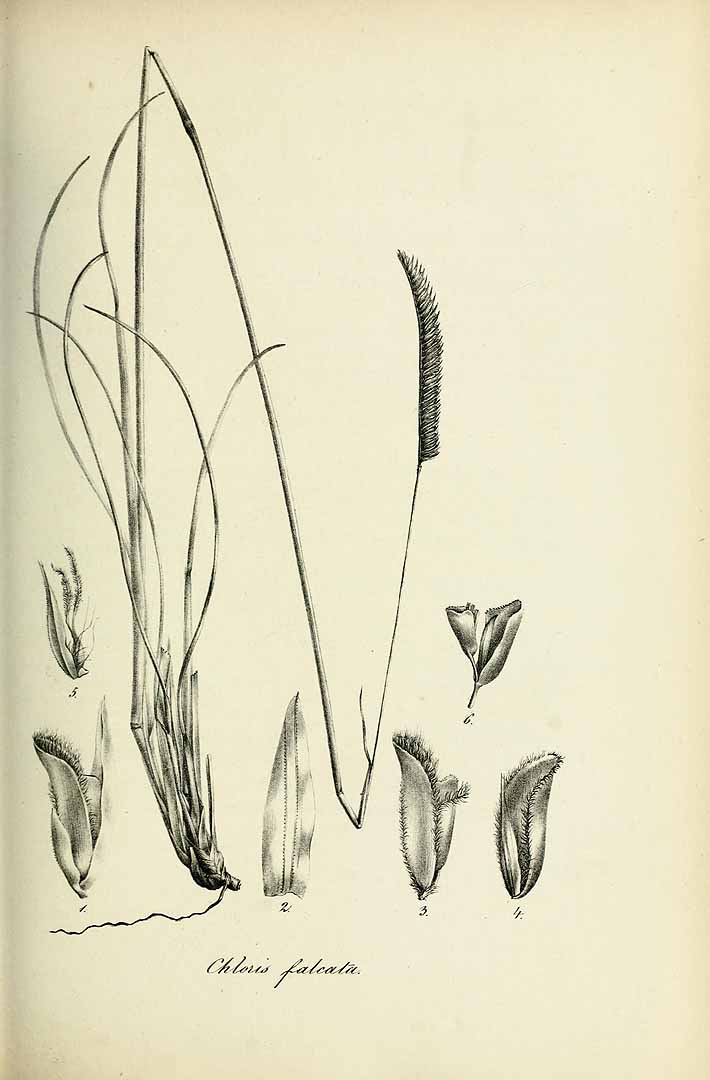
- Botanical illustration

Scientific classification
- Kingdom: Plantae
- Clade: Tracheophytes
- Clade: Angiosperms
- Clade: Monocots
- Clade: Commelinids
- Order: Poales
- Family: Poaceae
- Subfamily: Chloridoideae
- Genus: Harpochloa
- Species: H. falx

Binomial name
- Harpochloa falx (L.f.) Kuntze

Synonyms
- List: Campulosus falcatus P.Beauv.; Campulosus hirsutus Desv.; Chloris falcata Sw.; Cynosurus falcatus Thunb.; Dactyloctenium falcatum Willd.; Eleusine falcata Spreng.; Harpochloa capensis Kunth; Melica falx L.f.

= Harpochloa falx =

Species of plant

Harpochloa falx (common name caterpillar grass attending to the shape of its inflorescence), is a species of flowering plant in the family Poaceae, native to South Africa, Lesotho, and Eswatini. Although fire-adapted, in the absence of regular burns it comes to dominate its competitors.

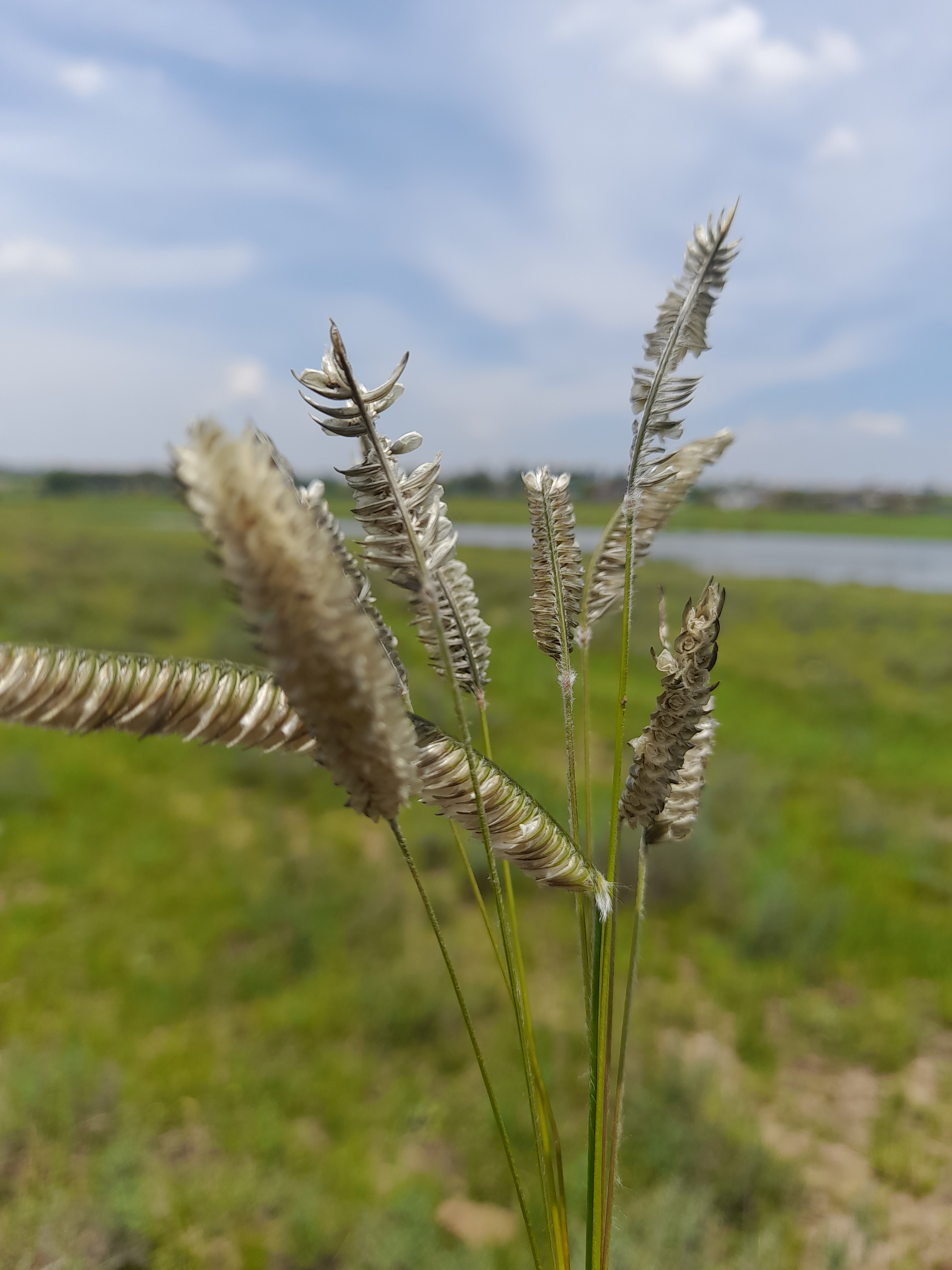
Caterpillar grass, Mamafubedu, Free State
