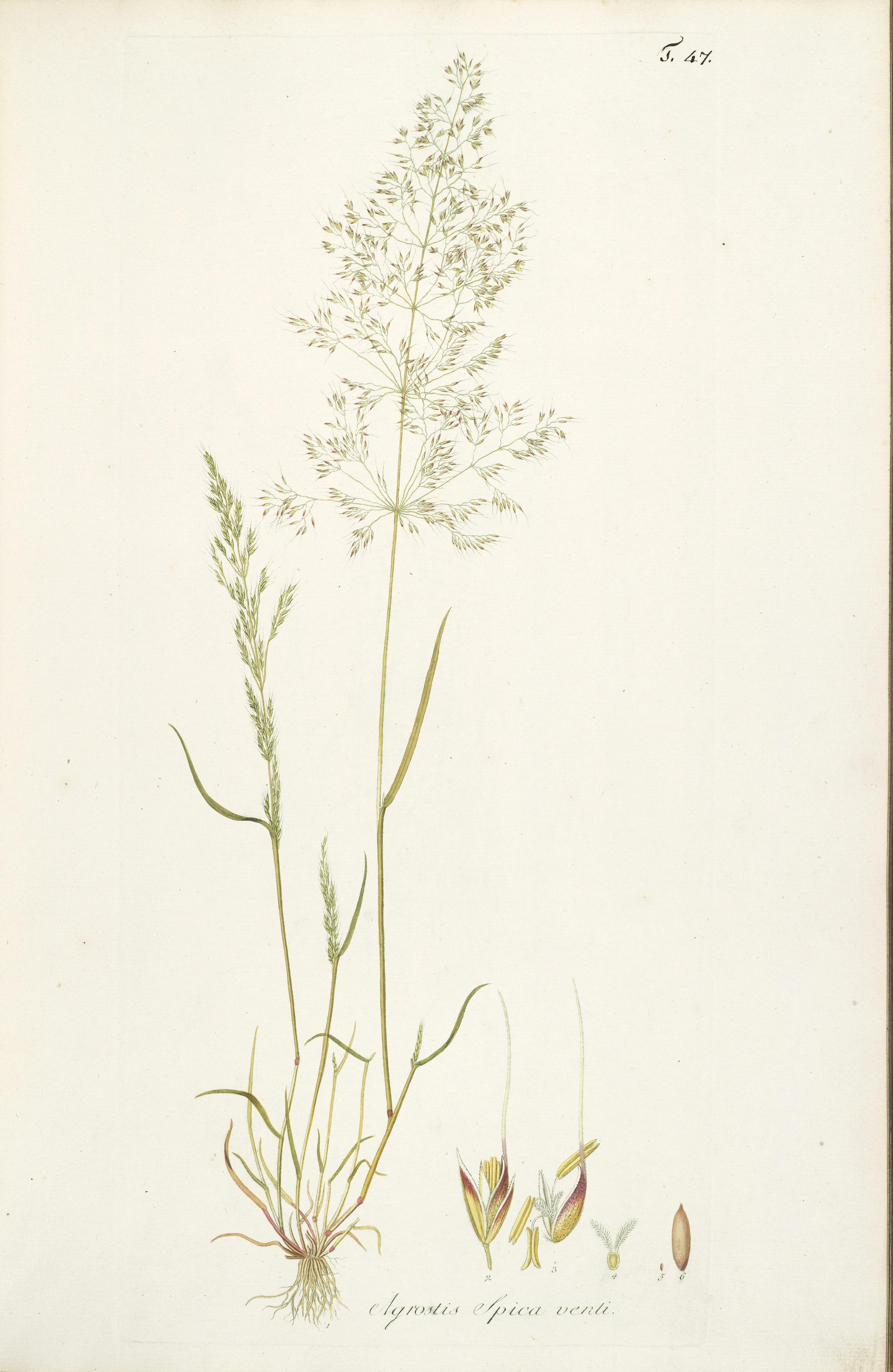
- Apera spica-venti

Scientific classification
- Kingdom: Plantae
- Clade: Tracheophytes
- Clade: Angiosperms
- Clade: Monocots
- Clade: Commelinids
- Order: Poales
- Family: Poaceae
- Subfamily: Pooideae
- Supertribe: Poodae
- Tribe: Poeae
- Subtribe: Ventenatinae
- Genus: Apera; Adans.

Type species
- Apera spica-venti (L.) P. Beauv.

Synonyms
- Anemagrostis Trin.

= Apera =

Genus of grasses

Apera is a small genus of annual grasses, known commonly as silkybent grass or windgrass. They are native to Europe, North Africa and parts of Asia but have been introduced and naturalized in much of North and South America.

Species

- Apera baytopiana Dogan - Muğla Province in southwestern Turkey
- Apera intermedia Hack. - Turkey, Aegean Islands, Iraq, Iran, Caucasus; naturalized in Primorye
- Apera interrupta (L.) P.Beauv. - dense silkybent, interrupted windgrass - Eurasia and North Africa from Portugal to Sweden to Algeria to Kazakhstan; naturalized in Argentina, Chile, United States, Canada
- Apera spica-venti (L.) P. Beauv. - loose silkybent, common windgrass - Eurasia and North Africa from Canary Islands to Denmark to Yakutia; naturalized in the United States, Canada, and Russian Far East
- Apera triaristata Dogan - Denizli Province in southwestern Turkey

formerly included

see Agrostis Anemanthele Dichelachne Muhlenbergia Sporobolus

- Apera arundinacea - Anemanthele lessoniana
- Apera aspera - Sporobolus compositus
- Apera crinita - Dichelachne crinita
- Apera liebmannii - Agrostis liebmannii
- Apera palustris - Agrostis stolonifera
- Apera procumbens - Agrostis stolonifera
- Apera purpurascens - Anemanthele lessoniana
- Apera tenuiflora - Muhlenbergia tenuiflora

== See also ==
- List of Poaceae genera
