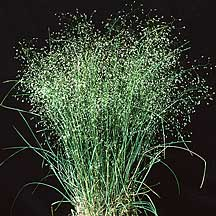
- Oryzopsis hymenoides

Scientific classification
- Kingdom: Plantae
- Clade: Tracheophytes
- Clade: Angiosperms
- Clade: Monocots
- Clade: Commelinids
- Order: Poales
- Family: Poaceae
- Subfamily: Pooideae
- Supertribe: Stipodae
- Tribe: Stipeae
- Genus: Oryzopsis; Michx., 1803

Type species
- Oryzopsis asperifolia Michx.

Synonyms
- Dilepyrum Raf. 1808, illegitimate name not Michx. 1803

= Oryzopsis =

Ricegrass

Genus of grasses

Oryzopsis is a genus of Chinese and North American plants in the grass family. Species from this genus are commonly called ricegrass.

The name alludes to the resemblance between this genus and true rice, Oryza.

Species

- Oryzopsis asperifolia Michx. – roughleaf ricegrass - Canada (all 10 provinces plus Yukon + Northwest Territories), United States (Northeast, Great Lakes, Black Hills, Rocky Mountains)
- Oryzopsis chinensis Hitchc. - China
- Oryzopsis contracta (B.L.Johnson) Schltr. - Colorado, Wyoming, Montana
- Oryzopsis exigua Thurb. - Wyoming
- Oryzopsis hendersonii Vasey - Oregon, Idaho, Washington state
- Oryzopsis holciformis (M.Bieb.) Hack. (syn. Piptatherum holciforme (M.Bieb.) Roem. & Schult.) - Israel
- Oryzopsis hymenoides (Roem. & Schult.) Ricker ex Piper - western North America from British Columbia + Alberta to California + New Mexico
- Oryzopsis pungens (Torr.) Hitchc. - Canada, northern United States
- Oryzopsis swallenii C.L.Hitchc.& Spellenb. - Idaho, Wyoming

formerly included

numerous species once regarded as members of Oryzopsis but now considered better suited to other genera: Achnatherum Achnella Anemanthele Eriocoma Nassella Piptatherum Piptatheropsis Piptochaetium Ptilagrostis Stipa Stiporyzopsis
