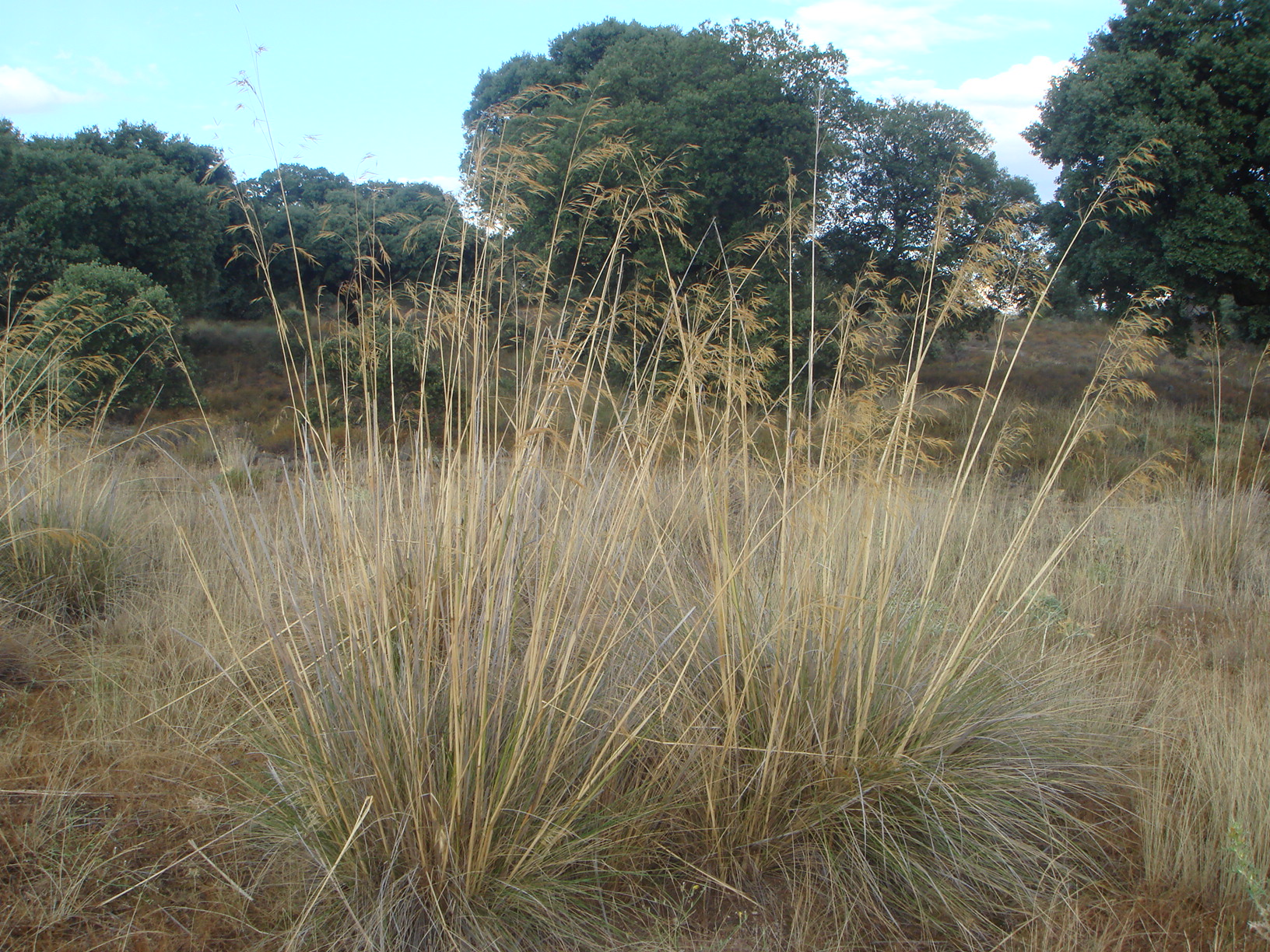
- Celtica gigantea

Scientific classification
- Kingdom: Plantae
- Clade: Tracheophytes
- Clade: Angiosperms
- Clade: Monocots
- Clade: Commelinids
- Order: Poales
- Family: Poaceae
- Clade: BOP clade
- Subfamily: Pooideae
- Supertribe: Stipodae
- Tribe: Stipeae; Dumort.

Genera
- 28 genera, see text

Synonyms
- supertribe Stipodae L. Liu; subtribe Stipinae Griseb.; Aciachninae Caro; Ortachninae Caro

= Stipeae =

Tribe of grasses

The Stipeae are a tribe of grasses within the subfamily Pooidae, with up to 600 described species.

== Description ==
The defining morphological features of the Stipeae include single-flowered spikelets lacking a rachilla extension, and the lemmas (the external bract) have either a sharp point or a terminal awn (long bristle).

== Genera ==
The tribe includes 32 genera:

- Achnatherum P.Beauv. (syn. Aristella)
- Aciachne Benth.
- Amelichloa Arriaga & Barkworth
- Anemanthele Veldkamp
- Austrostipa S.W.L.Jacobs & J.Everett
- Barkworthia Romasch., P.M.Peterson & Soreng
- Celtica F.M.Vázquez & Barkworth
- Eriocoma Nutt.
- × Eriosella Romasch.
- Hesperostipa (Elias) Barkworth
- Jarava Ruiz & Pav.
- Lorenzochloa Reeder & C.Reeder
- Macrochloa Kunth
- Nassella (Trin.) É.Desv.
- Neotrinia (Tzvelev) M.Nobis, P.D.Gudkova & A.Nowak
- Oloptum Röser & Hamasha
- Ortachne Nees ex Steud.
- Orthoraphium Nees
- Oryzopsis Michx.
- Pappostipa (Speg.) Romasch., P.M.Peterson & Soreng
- Patis Ohwi
- Piptatheropsis Romasch., P.M.Peterson & Soreng
- Piptatherum P.Beauv.
- Piptochaetium J.Presl.
- Psammochloa Htchc.
- Pseudoeriocoma Romasch., P.M.Peterson & Soreng
- Ptilagrostiella Romasch., P.M.Peterson & Soreng
- Ptilagrostis Griseb.
- Stipa L.
- Stipellula Röser & Hamasha (syn. Stipella)
- Thorneochloa Romasch., P.M.Peterson & Soreng
- Timouria Roshev.
- Trikeraia Bor

Many species initially placed into Stipa have now been split off into new genera. Some recent papers have analysed relationships within and between the genera, but a complete analysis has not yet been performed. Stipoid grasses use the C_{3} photosynthetic pathway and live in temperate areas worldwide.

Known fossils date from the late Miocene.
