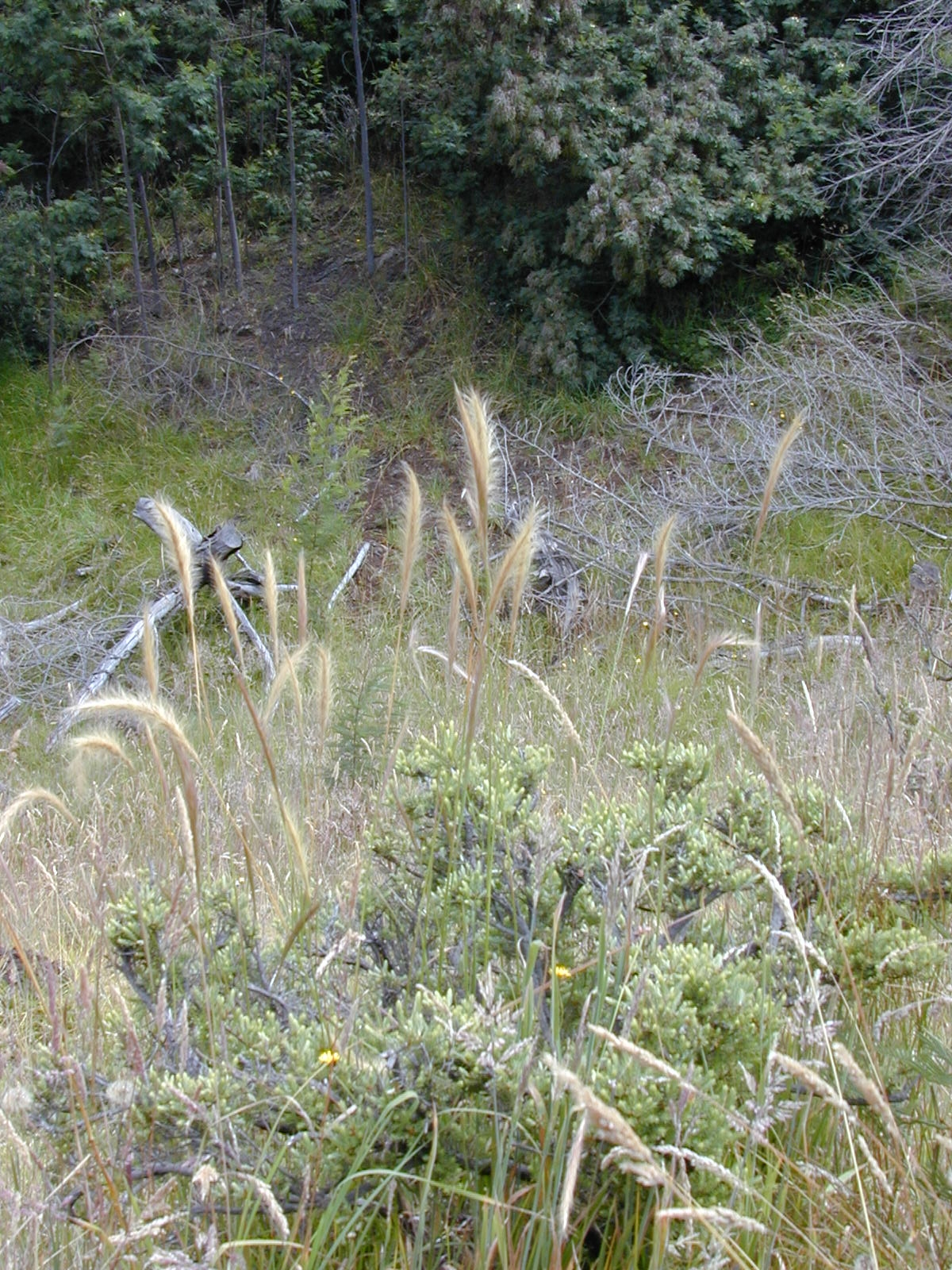
- Dichelachne crinita

Scientific classification
- Kingdom: Plantae
- Clade: Tracheophytes
- Clade: Angiosperms
- Clade: Monocots
- Clade: Commelinids
- Order: Poales
- Family: Poaceae
- Subfamily: Pooideae
- Supertribe: Poodae
- Tribe: Poeae
- Subtribe: Echinopogoninae
- Genus: Dichelachne; Endl.

Type species
- Dichelachne montana (syn of D. micrantha) Endl.

= Dichelachne =

Plumegrasses

Genus of grasses

Dichelachne is a genus of Australian, Indonesian, and Pacific Island plants in the grass family. They are known commonly as plumegrasses.

== Species ==
The genus includes the following species:

- Dichelachne crinita - longhair plumegrass, clovenfoot plumegrass - Australia (incl Norfolk I), New Guinea, New Zealand (incl Chatham Is + Kermadec Is)
- Dichelachne hirtella - New South Wales, Victoria, South Australia
- Dichelachne inaequiglumis - Australia, New Zealand
- Dichelachne lautumia - South I of New Zealand
- Dichelachne micrantha - shorthair plumegrass - Australia (incl Norfolk I), New Guinea, New Zealand (North I + Kermadec Is), Rapa Iti, Easter I
- Dichelachne parva - Queensland, New South Wales, Victoria, Tasmania
- Dichelachne rara - Australia, New Guinea, Lesser Sunda Is
- Dichelachne robusta - New South Wales, Victoria
- Dichelachne sieberiana - Sieber's plumegrass - Queensland, New South Wales, Victoria, Tasmania

Formerly included:

See Anemanthele, Austrostipa, Calamagrostis, Lachnagrostis, and Oryzopsis.

- Dichelachne brachyathera - Calamagrostis brachyathera
- Dichelachne drummondiana - Lachnagrostis drummondiana
- Dichelachne procera Steud. - Anemanthele lessoniana
- Dichelachne procera Trin. & Rupr. - Oryzopsis lessoniana
- Dichelachne rigida - Anemanthele lessoniana
- Dichelachne setacea - Austrostipa setacea
- Dichelachne stipoides - Austrostipa stipoides
