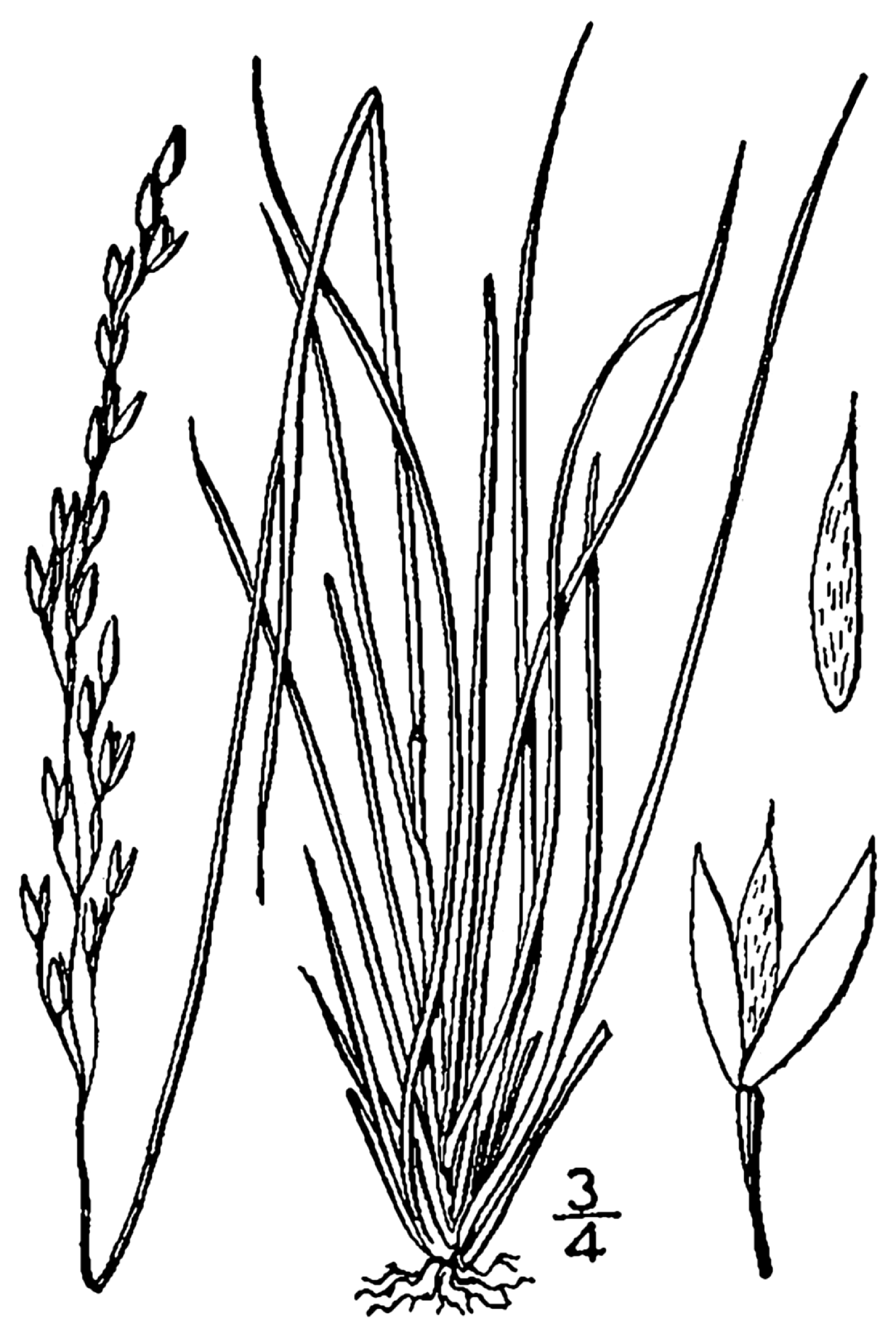
- 1913 illustration.

Scientific classification
- Kingdom: Plantae
- Clade: Tracheophytes
- Clade: Angiosperms
- Clade: Monocots
- Clade: Commelinids
- Order: Poales
- Family: Poaceae
- Subfamily: Pooideae
- Genus: Piptatherum
- Species: P. pungens

Binomial name
- Piptatherum pungens (Torr. ex Spreng.) Dorn

Synonyms
- Oryzopsis pungens

= Piptatherum pungens =

Species of flowering plant

Piptatherum pungens, also called Oryzopsis pungens, commonly called slender mountain-ricegrass, ricegrass, northern ricegrass, or slender mountain-rice, is a plant found in North America. It is listed as endangered in Connecticut, Iowa, New Jersey, and Pennsylvania. It is listed as extirpated in Indiana, as a special concern in Rhode Island, and as threatened in Vermont.
