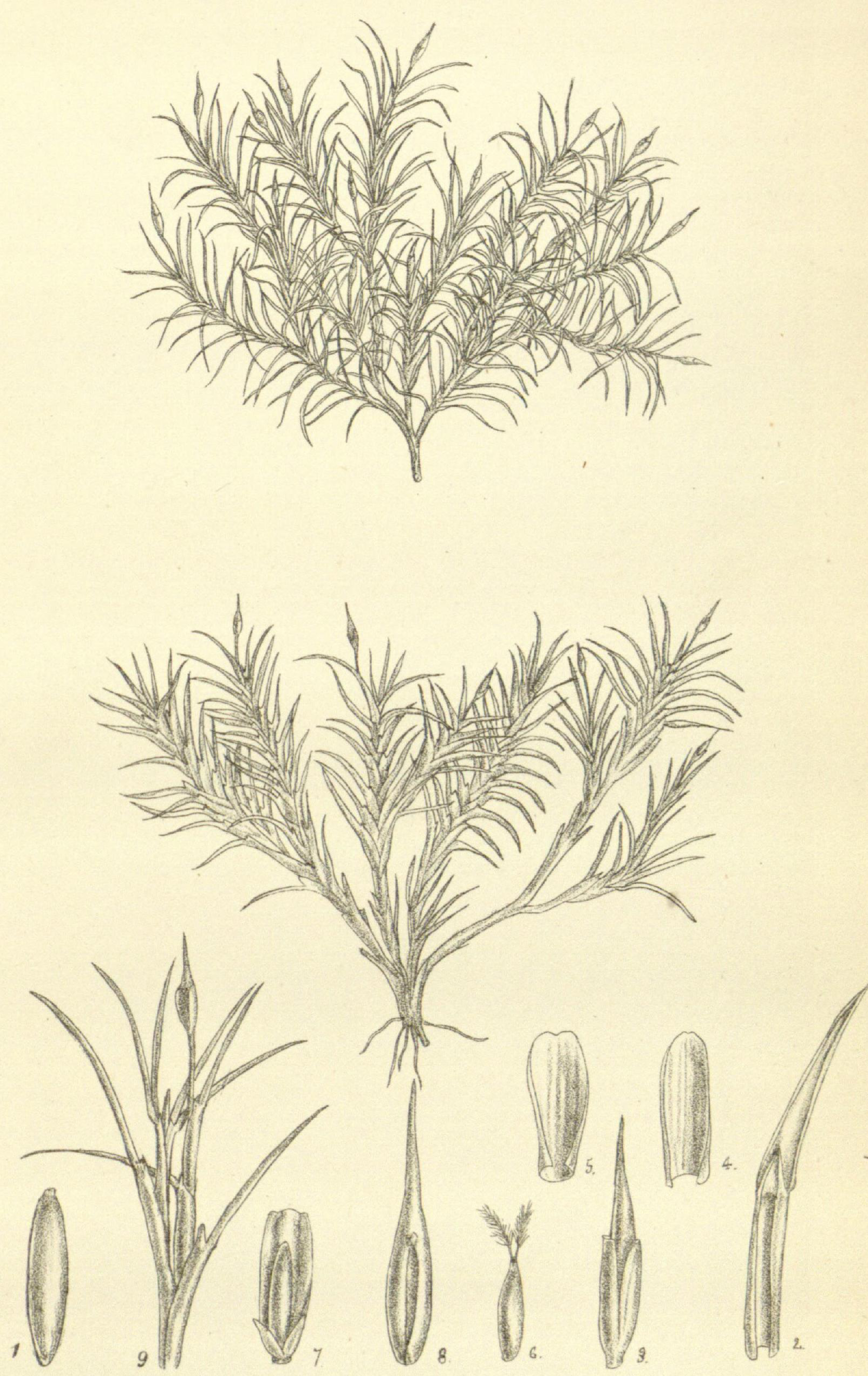
- Illustration accompanying the protologue

Scientific classification
- Kingdom: Plantae
- Clade: Tracheophytes
- Clade: Angiosperms
- Clade: Monocots
- Clade: Commelinids
- Order: Poales
- Family: Poaceae
- Subfamily: Pooideae
- Supertribe: Stipodae
- Tribe: Stipeae
- Genus: Aciachne; Benth.

Type species
- Aciachne pulvinata Benth.

= Aciachne =

Genus of grasses

Aciachne is a genus of Latin American plants in the grass family.

Species

- Aciachne acicularis Laegaard - Costa Rica, Venezuela (Táchira, Mérida), Colombia, Ecuador, Peru, Bolivia, Argentina (Catamarca)
- Aciachne flagellifera Laegaard - Colombia, Ecuador
- Aciachne pulvinata Benth. - Costa Rica, Venezuela (Mérida), Ecuador, Peru, Bolivia

== See also ==
- List of Poaceae genera
