= Trikeraia =

Scientific classification
- Kingdom: Plantae
- Clade: Tracheophytes
- Clade: Angiosperms
- Clade: Monocots
- Clade: Commelinids
- Order: Poales
- Family: Poaceae
- Subfamily: Pooideae
- Supertribe: Stipodae
- Tribe: Stipeae
- Genus: Trikeraia; Bor

Genus of grasses

Trikeraia is a genus of grasses. It includes two species which range from the Himalayas to north-central China.

- Trikeraia hookeri (Stapf) Bor
- Trikeraia pappiformis (Keng) P.C.Kuo & S.L.Lu

== Taxonomy ==
=== Original Description ===
The following account of Trikeraia is based on Bor’s original Latin protologue: (Note: Protologue translated from the original Latin by the article editor.)

Spikelets paniculate, pedicellate, elliptic-acute, awned; with a single floret; rachilla very short, disarticulating above the glumes, not prolonged. Glumes equal, more or less similar, as long as the spikelets, membranous, 3-nerved. Floret hermaphrodite; lemma oblong-elliptic, 5–7-nerved, dorsally covered with long white hairs, apex split, bearing a rough awn emerging from the fissure; lateral lobes produced into stout, very scabrous bristles. Palea hyaline, 2-nerved, dorsally covered with similar hairs. Stamens 3; anthers long. Styles 2, short; stigmas plumose. Lodicules large, 3. Caryopsis not seen. Perennial rhizomatous grasses; culms robust, erect, with few nodes; leaf blades involute, setaceous, eventually somewhat flat, furrowed; ligules membranous; panicles contracted or open, shortly or long-branched.
