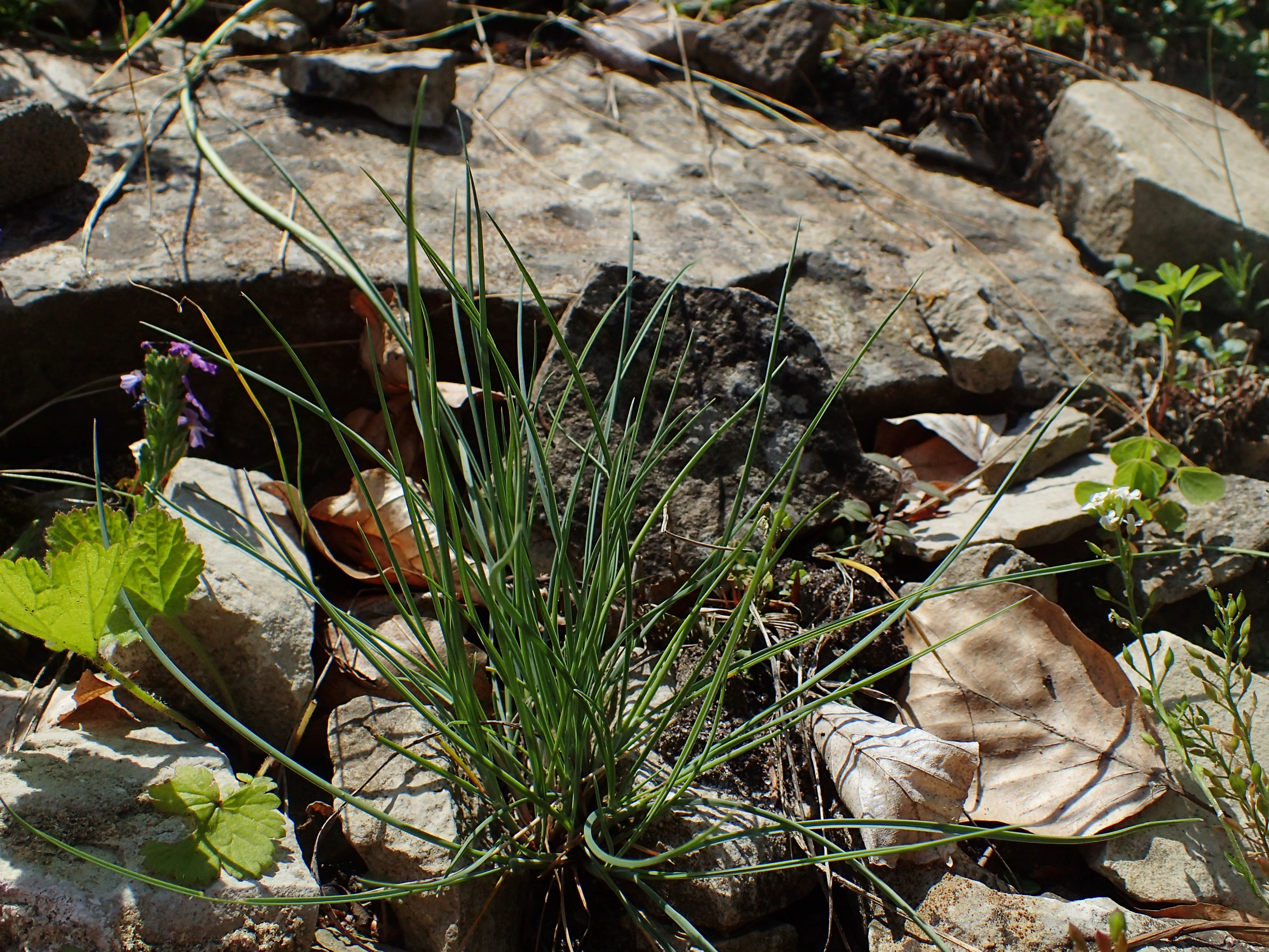
- Piptatherum coerulescens

Scientific classification
- Kingdom: Plantae
- Clade: Tracheophytes
- Clade: Angiosperms
- Clade: Monocots
- Clade: Commelinids
- Order: Poales
- Family: Poaceae
- Subfamily: Pooideae
- Genus: Piptatherum
- Species: P. coerulescens

Binomial name
- Piptatherum coerulescens (Desf.) P.Beauv.

Synonyms
- Oryzopsis coerulescens

= Piptatherum coerulescens =

Species of plant

Piptatherum coerulescens is a species of perennial grass in the family Poaceae (true grasses). They have a self-supporting growth form.

== Sources ==
This article incorporates text from a free content work. Licensed under CC0 (license statement/permission). Text taken from Piptatherum coerulescens. Encyclopedia of Life.
