= Orthoraphium =

Scientific classification
- Kingdom: Plantae
- Clade: Tracheophytes
- Clade: Angiosperms
- Clade: Monocots
- Clade: Commelinids
- Order: Poales
- Family: Poaceae
- Subfamily: Pooideae
- Supertribe: Stipodae
- Tribe: Stipeae
- Genus: Orthoraphium; Nees
- Species: O. roylei

Binomial name
- Orthoraphium roylei Nees

Genus of plants

Orthoraphium is a monotypic genus of flowering plants belonging to the family Poaceae. The only species is Orthoraphium roylei.

Its native range is Himalaya to Japan.
