= Psammochloa =

Scientific classification
- Kingdom: Plantae
- Clade: Tracheophytes
- Clade: Angiosperms
- Clade: Monocots
- Clade: Commelinids
- Order: Poales
- Family: Poaceae
- Subfamily: Pooideae
- Supertribe: Stipodae
- Tribe: Stipeae
- Genus: Psammochloa; Hitchc.
- Species: P. villosa

Binomial name
- Psammochloa villosa (Trin.) Bor

Synonyms
- Arundo villosa Trin.; Ammophila villosa (Trin.) Hand.-Mazz.; Timouria villosa (Trin.) Hand.-Mazz.; Psammochloa mongolica Hitchc.; Timouria mongolica (Hitchc.) Roshev.

Genus of grasses

Psammochloa is a plant genus in the grass family. The only known species is Psammochloa villosa.

== Distribution ==
Psammochloa villosa is native to Mongolia and China (Gansu, Inner Mongolia, Ningxia, Qinghai, Shaanxi, Xinjiang). It spreads by rhizomes.
