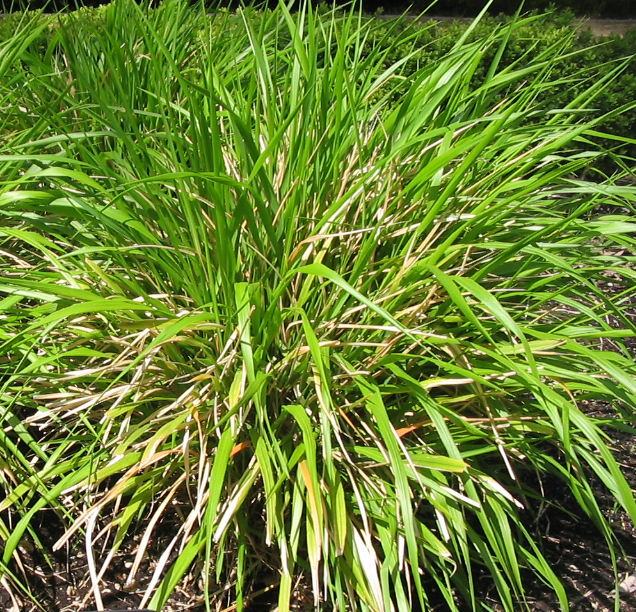
- Piptatherum paradoxum

Scientific classification
- Kingdom: Plantae
- Clade: Tracheophytes
- Clade: Angiosperms
- Clade: Monocots
- Clade: Commelinids
- Order: Poales
- Family: Poaceae
- Subfamily: Pooideae
- Supertribe: Stipodae
- Tribe: Stipeae
- Genus: Piptatherum; P.Beauv.

Type species
- Piptatherum coerulescens (Desf.) P.Beauv.

Synonyms
- Urachne Trin.; Oryzopsis sect. Piptatherum (P.Beauv.) Benth. & Hook.f.; Urachne subg. Piptatherum (P.Beauv.) Trin. & Rupr.

= Piptatherum =

Genus of grasses

Piptatherum is a genus of plants in the grass family known as ricegrass.

They are widely distributed across much of Eurasia, North Africa, and North America. These are clumping perennial grasses with long, tapering leaf blades.

Species

- Piptatherum aequiglume
- Piptatherum alpestre
- Piptatherum angustifolium
- Piptatherum baluchistanicum
- Piptatherum barbellatum
- Piptatherum blancheanum
- Piptatherum canadense
- Piptatherum coerulescens
- Piptatherum ferganense
- Piptatherum flaccidum
- Piptatherum gracile
- Piptatherum grandispiculum
- Piptatherum grigorjevii
- Piptatherum hilariae
- Piptatherum holciforme
- Piptatherum kopetdagense
- Piptatherum kuoi
- Piptatherum laterale
- Piptatherum latifolium
- Piptatherum micranthum
- Piptatherum microcarpum
- Piptatherum molinioides
- Piptatherum munroi
- Piptatherum pamiralaicum
- Piptatherum paradoxum
- Piptatherum platyanthum
- Piptatherum pungens
- Piptatherum purpurascens
- Piptatherum racemosum
- Piptatherum rechingeri
- Piptatherum roshevitsianum
- Piptatherum sogdianum
- Piptatherum songaricum
- Piptatherum tibeticum
- Piptatherum virescens

formerly included

see Achnatherum Arundinella Eriochloa Nassella Oryzopsis Piptatheropsis Piptochaetium Stipa
