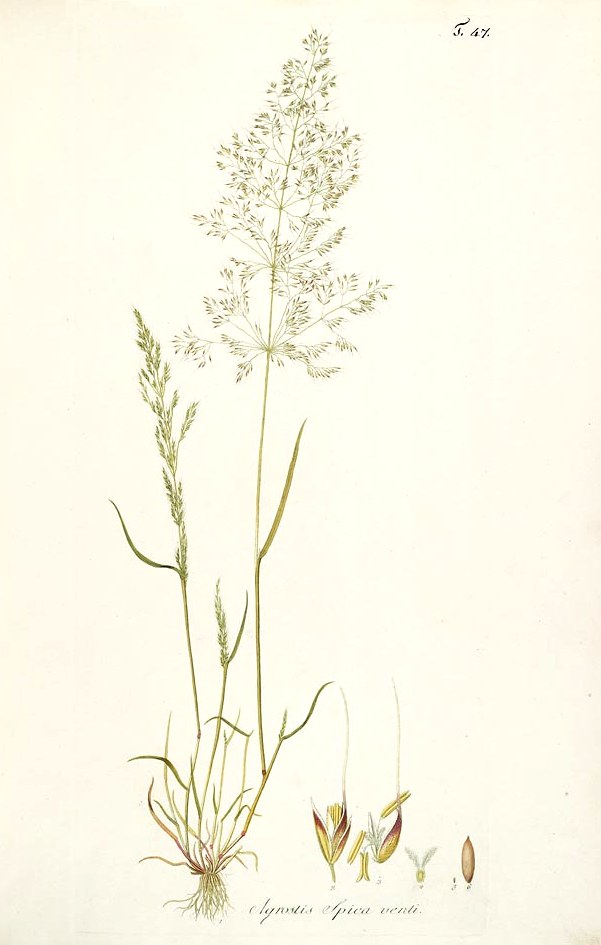
- Apera spica-venti

Scientific classification
- Kingdom: Plantae
- Clade: Embryophytes
- Clade: Tracheophytes
- Clade: Spermatophytes
- Clade: Angiosperms
- Clade: Monocots
- Clade: Commelinids
- Order: Poales
- Family: Poaceae
- Subfamily: Pooideae
- Genus: Apera
- Species: A. spica-venti

Binomial name
- Apera spica-venti (L.) P.Beauv.

= Apera spica-venti =

Species of grass

Apera spica-venti, the loose silky-bent or common windgrass, is an annual or biannual plant in the genus Apera. It belongs to the family Poaceae. It is a Diploid species meaning that it contains two sets of chromosomes.

This species is native to Eurasia and North Africa from the Canary Islands to Denmark to Yakutia. It occurs in pastures with sandy soil. It has naturalized in the United States, Canada, and Russian Far East.

== Description ==
This species of grass grows to about 40–100 centimetres (16–39 in) high.
