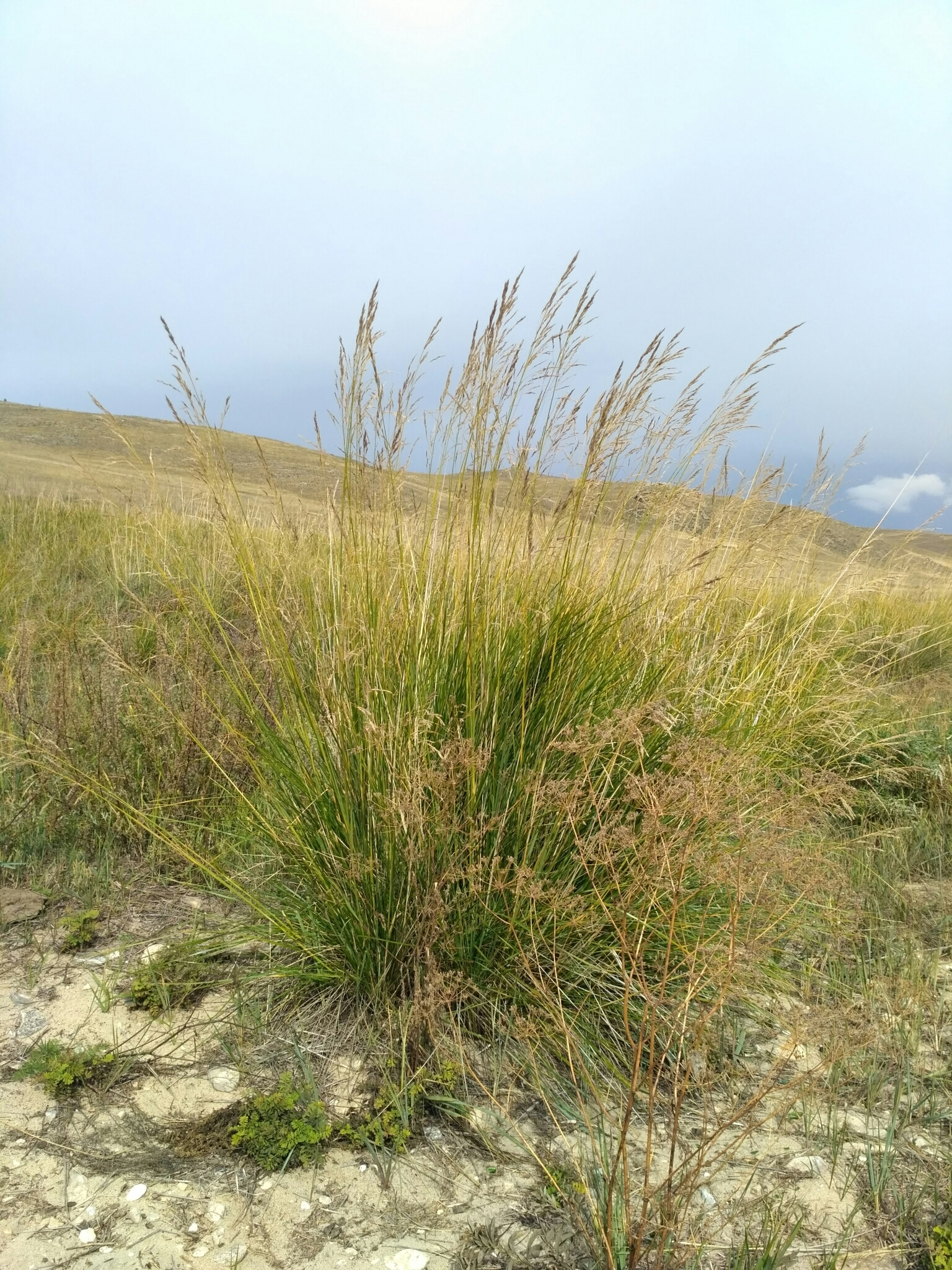

Scientific classification
- Kingdom: Plantae
- Clade: Tracheophytes
- Clade: Angiosperms
- Clade: Monocots
- Clade: Commelinids
- Order: Poales
- Family: Poaceae
- Subfamily: Pooideae
- Genus: Neotrinia
- Species: N. splendens

Binomial name
- Neotrinia splendens (Trin.) M.Nobis, P.D.Gudkova & A.Nowak

Synonyms
- Stipa splendens (Trin.); Achnatherum splendens (Trin.) Nevski

= Neotrinia splendens =

Species of flowering plant

Neotrinia splendens is a species of grass. It is found from the East European Plain, across Siberia and Central Asia to the Himalayas. This grass is an important forage crop in areas of the Kazakh steppe.
