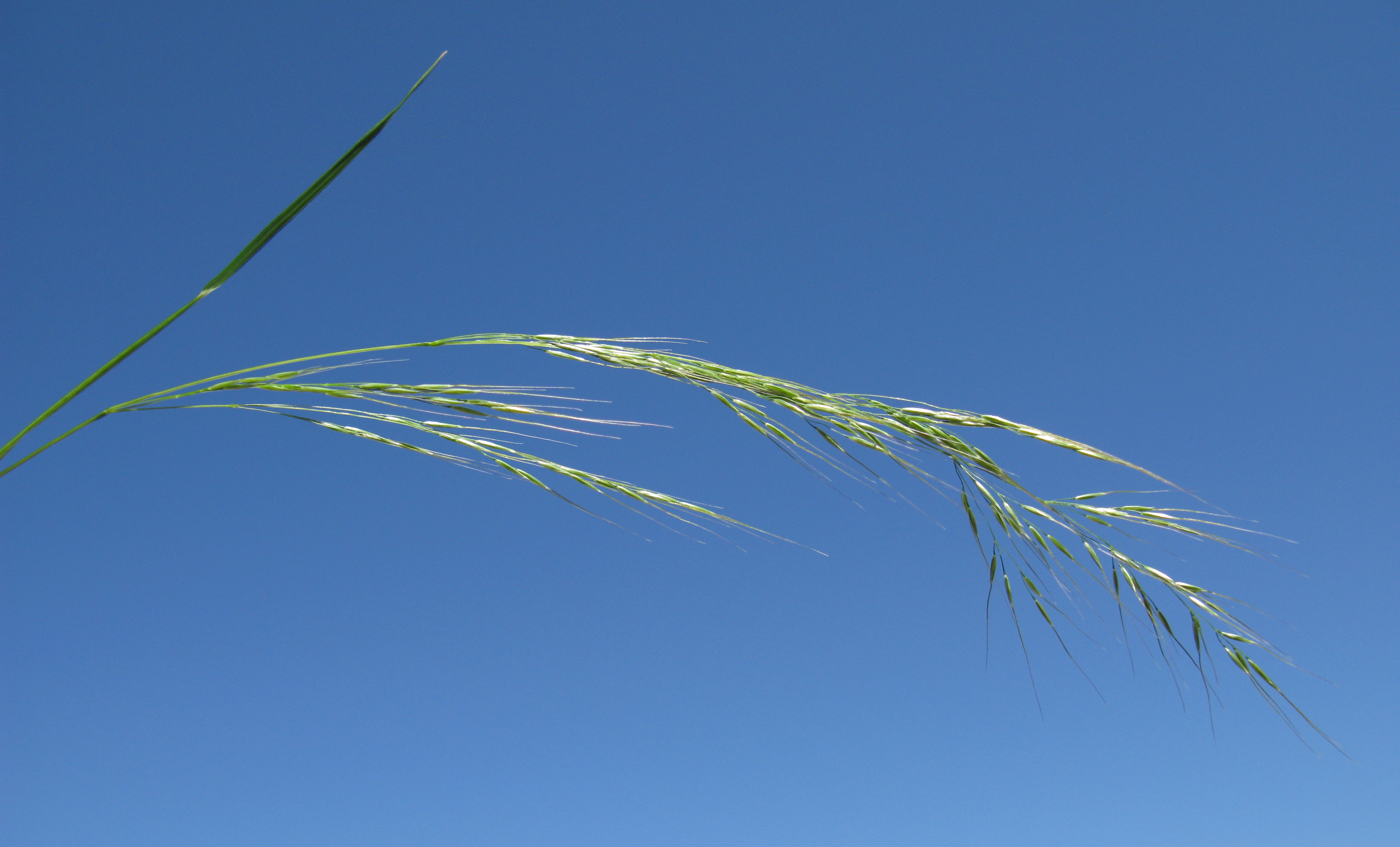

Scientific classification
- Kingdom: Plantae
- Clade: Tracheophytes
- Clade: Angiosperms
- Clade: Monocots
- Clade: Commelinids
- Order: Poales
- Family: Poaceae
- Subfamily: Pooideae
- Genus: Dichelachne
- Species: D. rara

Binomial name
- Dichelachne rara (R.Br.) Vickery

= Dichelachne rara =

Species of grass

Dichelachne rara is a species of grass found in Australia and New Zealand. It is often seen in woodland on better quality soils. The grass may grow up to 1.2 m (3 ft 11 in) tall. The specific epithet rara is derived from Latin (scattered or uncommon).
