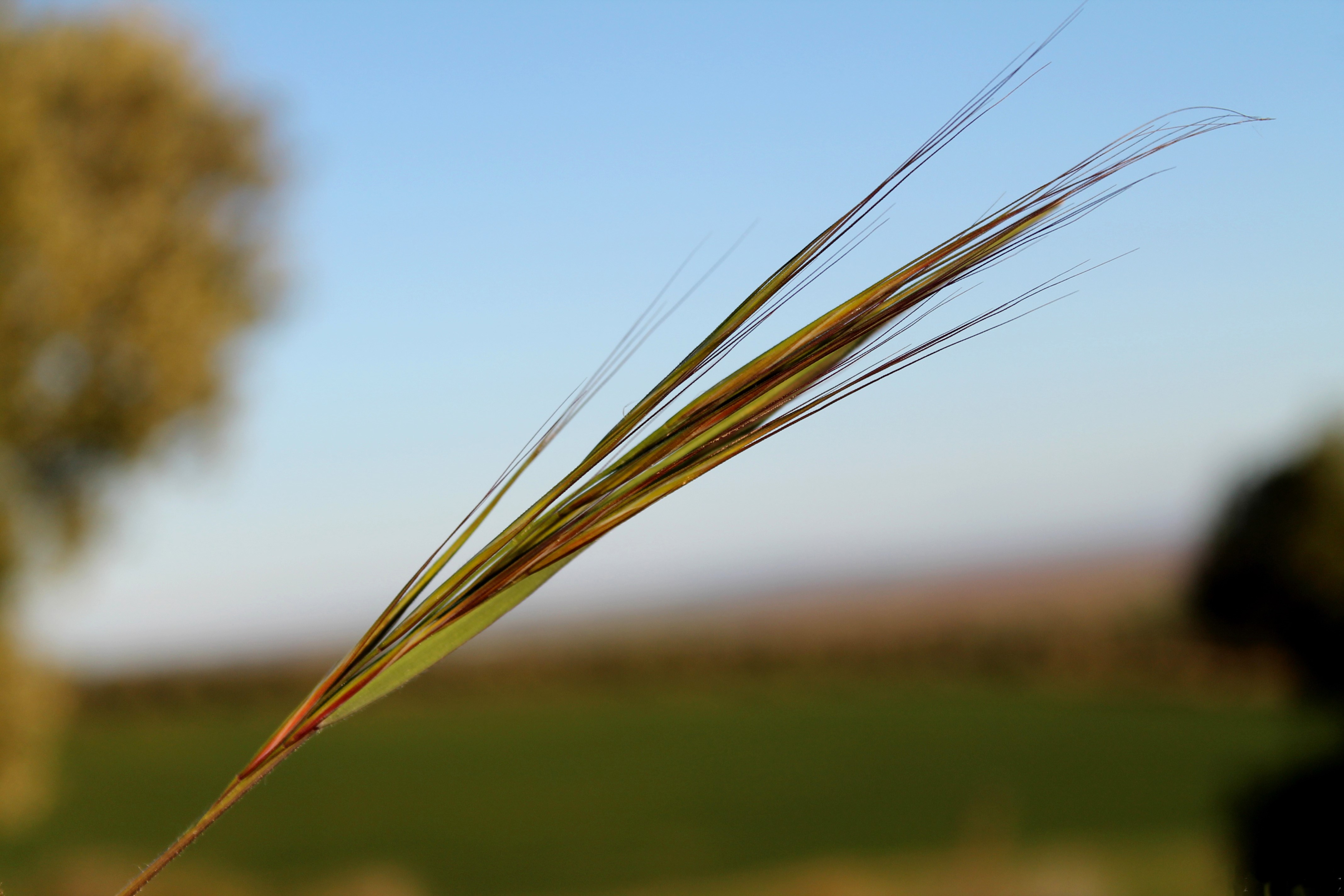

Scientific classification
- Kingdom: Plantae
- Clade: Tracheophytes
- Clade: Angiosperms
- Clade: Monocots
- Clade: Commelinids
- Order: Poales
- Family: Poaceae
- Genus: Stipellula
- Species: S. capensis

Binomial name
- Stipellula capensis (Thunb.) Röser & Hamasha

Synonyms
- Stipa capensis Thunb. (1794) (basionym); Stipa capensis var. tortilis (Desf.) Breistr.; Stipa humilis Brot., nom. illeg.; Stipa liwinowii Roshev., pro syn.; Stipa retorta Cav.; Stipa seminuda Vahl ex Hornem.; Stipa tenacissima Ucria, nom. illeg.; Stipa tortilis Desf.; Stipa tortilis var. pubescens Ball; Stipella capensis (Thunb.) Röser & Hamasha; Stipellula capensis var. pubescens (Ball) F.M.Vázquez

= Stipellula capensis =

Species of grass

Stipellula capensis, the Mediterranean needle-grass, Cape rice grass, Mediterranean steppegrass or twisted-awned speargrass, is an annual grass from family Poaceae.

The species ranges from the Canary Islands and Madeira through the Mediterranean basin and Western Asia to the Caucasus, Arabian Peninsula, and India, and is also native to the Cape Provinces of South Africa. It is native to the Persian Gulf desert and semi-desert ecoregion. In Persian it is called bahman and is probably the same plant which was used in the Persian festivity of bahmanagān.
