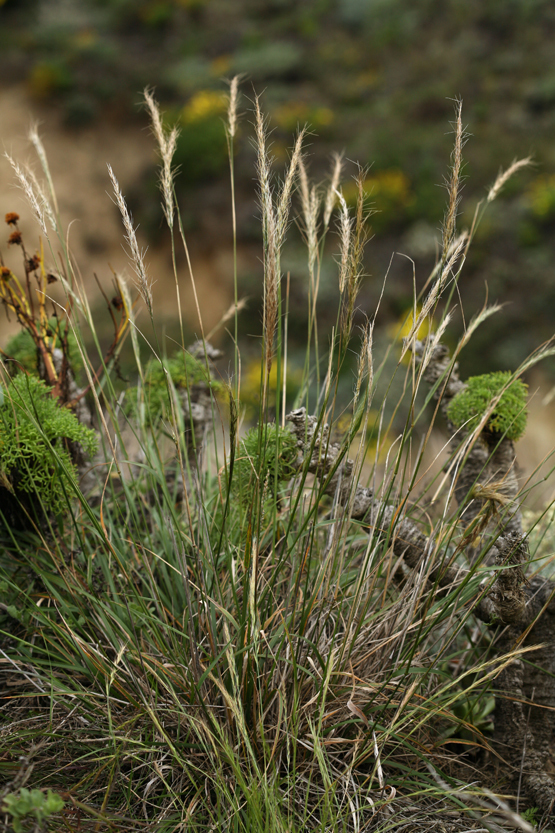

Conservation status
- Apparently Secure (NatureServe)

Scientific classification
- Kingdom: Plantae
- Clade: Tracheophytes
- Clade: Angiosperms
- Clade: Monocots
- Clade: Commelinids
- Order: Poales
- Family: Poaceae
- Subfamily: Pooideae
- Supertribe: Stipodae
- Tribe: Stipeae
- Genus: Thorneochloa; Romasch., P.M.Peterson & Soreng
- Species: T. diegoensis

Binomial name
- Thorneochloa diegoensis (Swallen) Romasch.

Synonyms
- Achnatherum diegoense (Swallen) Barkworth; Stipa diegoensis Swallen

= Thorneochloa =

Genus of flowering plants

Thorneochloa is a genus of flowering plants belonging to the family Poaceae. It contains a single species, Thorneochloa diegoensis, commonly known as San Diego needlegrass. It is a perennial grass native to southern California and northern Baja California.

== Description ==
Thorneochloa diegoensis is a bunching perennial grass with culms (stems) between 70–140 cm (28–55 in) tall in an erect or ascending habit. The culms are 2–4 mm (0.079–0.157 in) thick, and characteristically 3–9 mm (0.12–0.35 in) below the lower nodes the internodes have a dense pubescence of retrorse (pointing downward) hairs. The leaf sheath may be glabrous or pubescent, and the collar with a tuft of hairs that measure 1.5–2 mm (0.059–0.079 in) long. The leaf blades are 15–40 cm (5.9–15.7 in) long by 1–3.5 mm (0.039–0.138 in) wide.

The inflorescence, a narrow, densely-flowered panicle, is up to 30 cm (12 in) long, with ascending, appressed branches. The pedicels are usually shorter than the spikelets. The spikelet is lanceolate with a single fertile floret. The glumes are 8–11.5 mm (0.31–0.45 in) long. The floret and lemma are 5.5–7.5 mm (0.22–0.30 in) long, the lemma evenly hairy and its margins enveloping most of the palea. The lemma is 1.3 to 2 × longer than the palea, and has a long scabrous awn 20–50 mm (0.79–1.97 in) long that is bent twice. Flowering is typically from March to June.

== Taxonomy ==
Thorneochloa diegoensis was first described as Stipa diegoensis by Jason Richard Swallen in 1940 based on specimens collected by Frank F. Gander in Proctor Valley. It was later transferred into the genus Achnatherum by Mary Barkworth in 1993, along with many grasses mostly segregated from Stipa as part of a new delineation of the North American Stipeae.

A reorganization of the Stipeae tribe based on molecular phylogenetics by Peterson et al. in 2019 resulted in the new monotypic genus Thorneochloa and a new combination for this species, Thorneochloa diegoensis. Thorneochloa is part of a strongly-supported clade with Achnatherum that is characterized by a maize-like epidermal pattern on the lemma. The genus is named in honor of botanist Robert Folger Thorne.

== Distribution and habitat ==
Thorneochloa diegoensis is native to southern California and northern Baja California. It occurs on all of the northern Channel Islands and San Nicolas Island, and on the mainland in San Diego County in the Peninsular Ranges, continuing south across the international border along the coast of Baja California to San Quintín and Isla Todos Santos. It is a resident of chaparral and coastal sage scrub ecosystems below 350 feet in elevation, especially near streams.
