= Barkworthia =

Scientific classification
- Kingdom: Plantae
- Clade: Tracheophytes
- Clade: Angiosperms
- Clade: Monocots
- Clade: Commelinids
- Order: Poales
- Family: Poaceae
- Subfamily: Pooideae
- Supertribe: Stipodae
- Tribe: Stipeae
- Genus: Barkworthia; Romasch., P.M.Peterson & Soreng
- Species: B. stillmanii

Binomial name
- Barkworthia stillmanii (Bol.) Romasch., P.M.Peterson & Soreng

Synonyms
- Achnatherum stillmanii (Bol.) Barkworth; Stipa stillmanii Bol.

Genus of flowering plants

Barkworthia is a genus of flowering plants belonging to the family Poaceae. It contains a single species, Barkworthia stillmanii, a perennial grass native to California.
