= Pseudoeriocoma =

Scientific classification
- Kingdom: Plantae
- Clade: Tracheophytes
- Clade: Angiosperms
- Clade: Monocots
- Clade: Commelinids
- Order: Poales
- Family: Poaceae
- Subfamily: Pooideae
- Tribe: Stipeae
- Genus: Pseudoeriocoma; Romasch., P.M.Peterson & Soreng (2019)

Species
- 6; see text

Genus of flowering plants

Pseudoeriocoma is a genus of grasses. It includes six species native to Mexico and to Texas, New Mexico, and Arizona in the southwestern United States.

== Species ==
Six species are accepted.

- Pseudoeriocoma acuta (Swallen) Romasch.
- Pseudoeriocoma constricta (Hitchc.) Romasch.
- Pseudoeriocoma editorum (E.Fourn.) Romasch.
- Pseudoeriocoma eminens (Cav.) Romasch.
- Pseudoeriocoma hirticulmis (S.L.Hatch, Valdés-Reyna & Morden) Romasch.
- Pseudoeriocoma multinodis (Scribn. ex Beal) Romasch.
