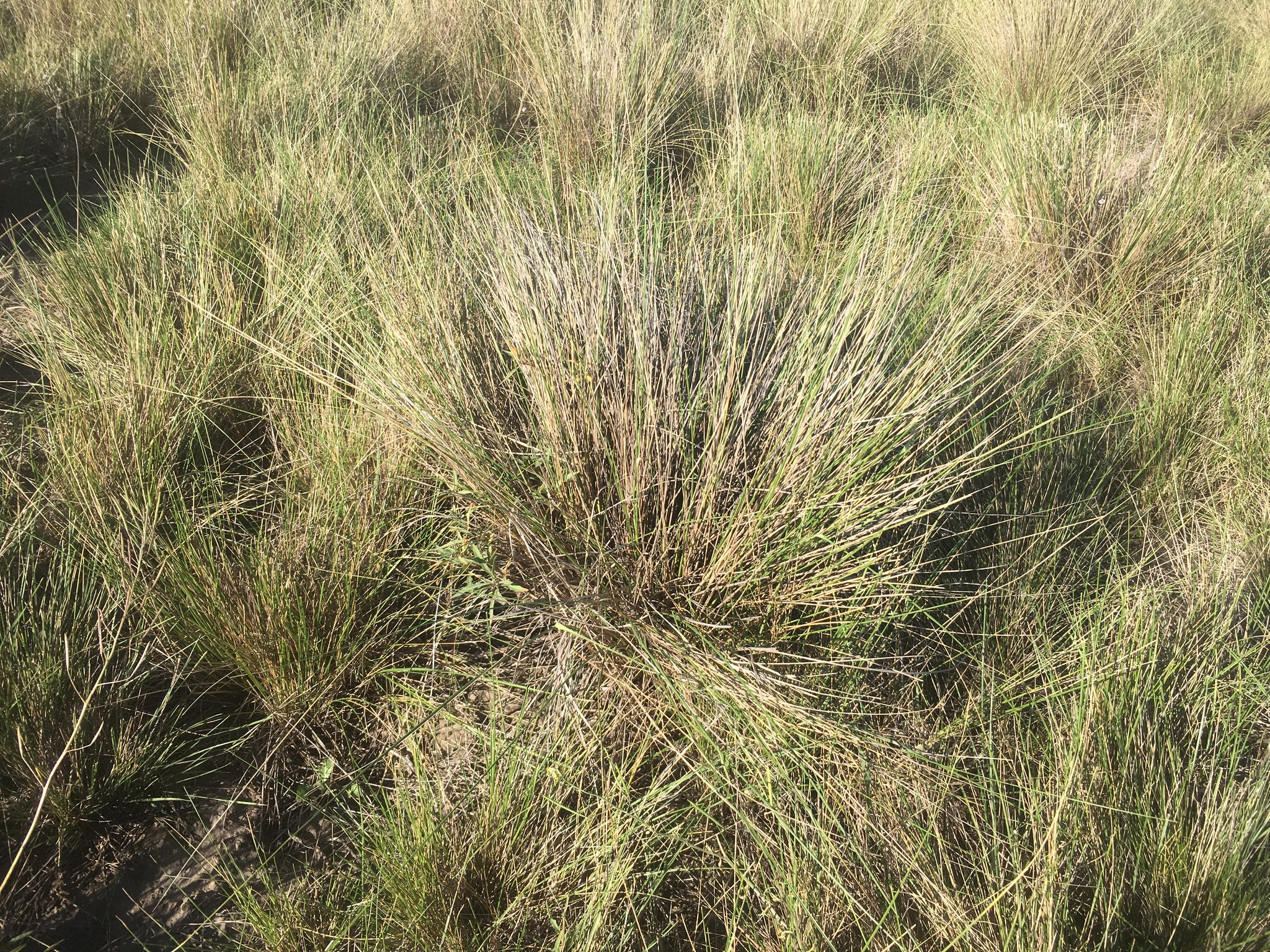
- A. ambigua

Scientific classification
- Kingdom: Plantae
- Clade: Tracheophytes
- Clade: Angiosperms
- Clade: Monocots
- Clade: Commelinids
- Order: Poales
- Family: Poaceae
- Subfamily: Pooideae
- Supertribe: Stipodae
- Tribe: Stipeae
- Genus: Amelichloa; Arriaga & Barkworth

= Amelichloa =

Genus of plants

Amelichloa is a genus of flowering plants belonging to the family Poaceae.

Its native range stretches from Mexico into southern South America. It is found in (southern, north-eastern and north-western) Argentina, Chile, most of Mexico and Uruguay.

The genus was circumscribed by Mirta O. Arriaga and Mary Elizabeth Barkworth in Sida vol.22 on page 146 in 2006.

The genus name of Amelichloa is in honour of María Amelia Torres (1934–2011), who was an Argentine botanist, lecturer and curator of the Herbarium of the National University of La Plata.

== Species ==
As accepted by Kew:

- Amelichloa ambigua (Speg.) Arriaga & Barkworth
- Amelichloa brachychaeta (Godr.) Arriaga & Barkworth
- Amelichloa brevipes (É.Desv.) Arriaga & Barkworth
- Amelichloa caudata (Trin.) Arriaga & Barkworth
- Amelichloa clandestina (Hack.) Arriaga & Barkworth
