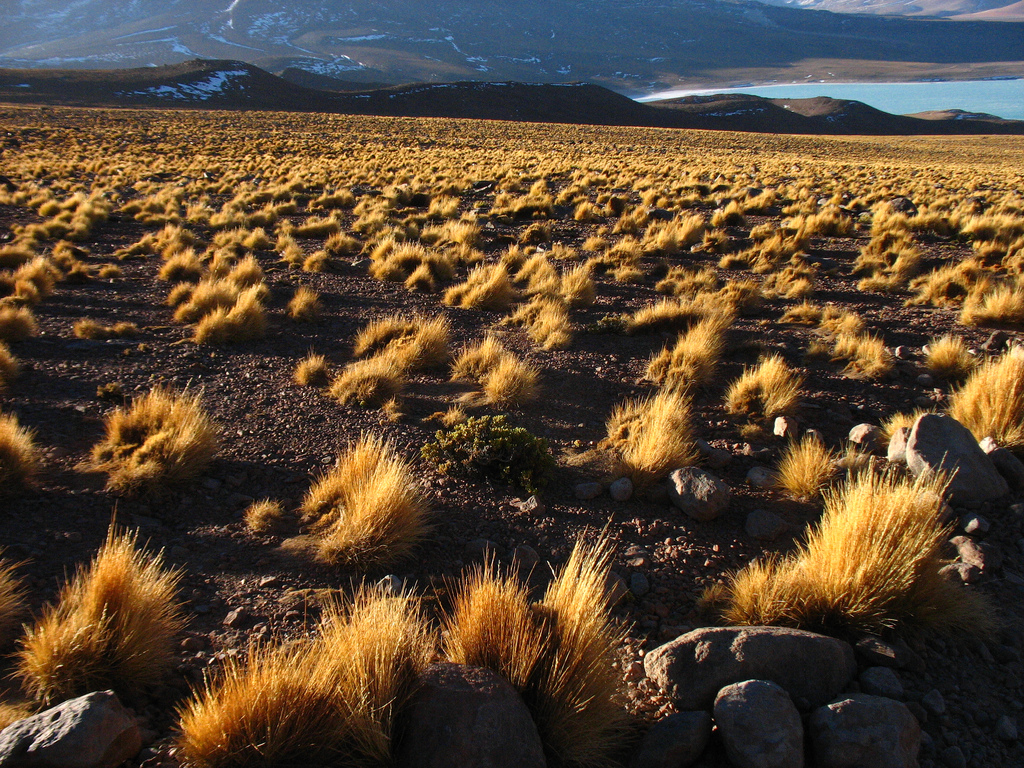

Scientific classification
- Kingdom: Plantae
- Clade: Tracheophytes
- Clade: Angiosperms
- Clade: Monocots
- Clade: Commelinids
- Order: Poales
- Family: Poaceae
- Subfamily: Pooideae
- Genus: Jarava
- Species: J. ichu

Binomial name
- Jarava ichu Ruiz & Pav.

Synonyms
- Stipa ichu (Ruiz & Pav.) Kunth; Stipa jarava P.Beauv.; Jarava arundinacea Willd. ex Steud.; Jarava eriostachya (Kunth) Peñail.; Jarava usitata Pers.; Stipa eriostachya Kunth; Stipa gynerioides Phil.; Stipa ichu var. gynerioides (Phil.) Hack.; Stipa ichu f. interrupta Hack.; Stipa liebmannii E.Fourn.

= Jarava ichu =

Species of plant

Jarava ichu, commonly known as Peruvian feathergrass, ichhu, paja brava, paja ichu, or simply ichu (Quechua for straw), is a grass species in the family Poaceae native to the Americas. It is found growing in a vast area: Mexico, Guatemala, Costa Rica, El Salvador, Venezuela, Bolivia, Colombia, Ecuador, Peru, Dominican Republic, Chile, and Argentina. It is a common grass of the Andean altiplano. It is used as fodder for livestock.

Under the synonym Stipa ichu, it has won the Royal Horticultural Society's Award of Garden Merit.
