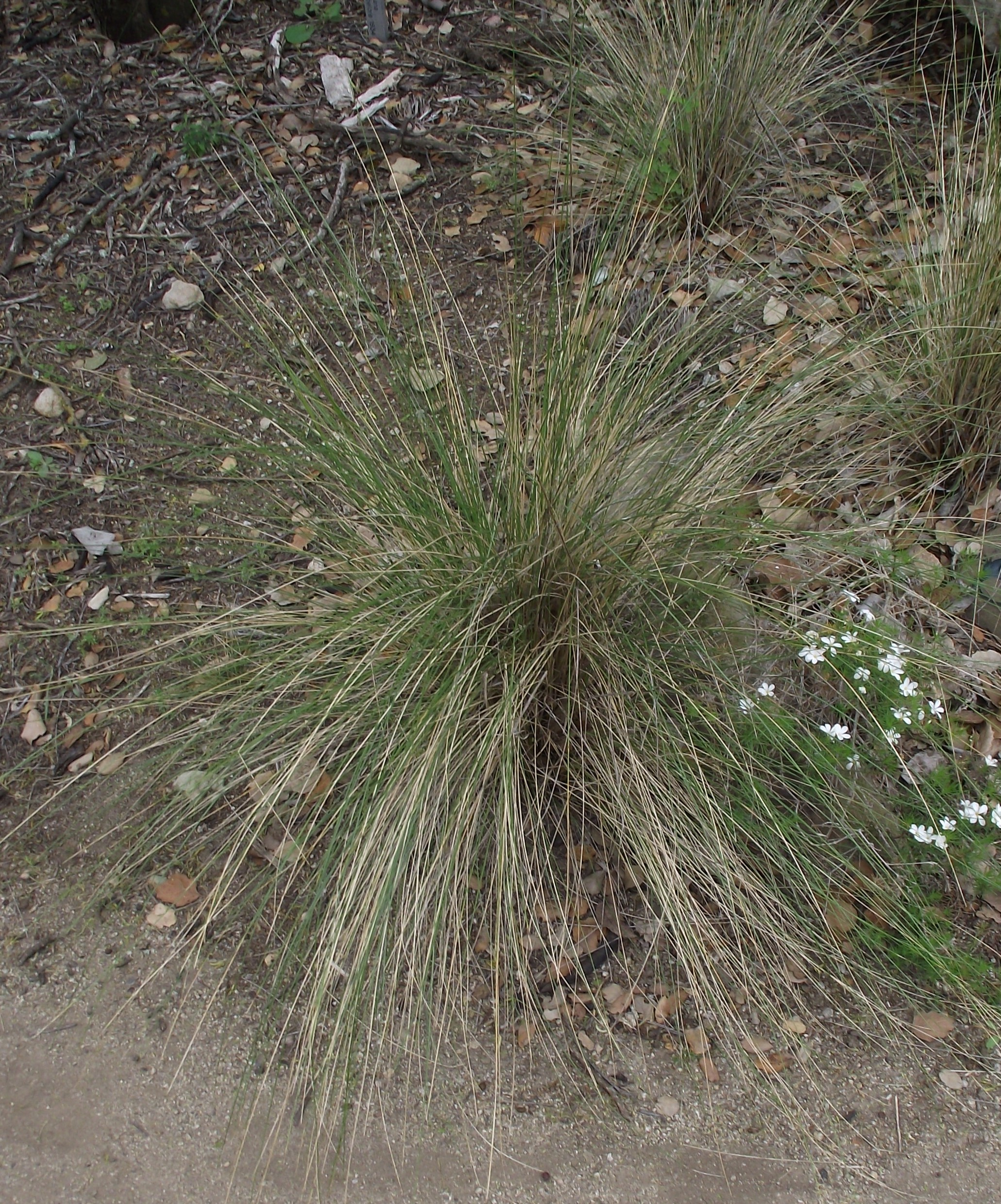

Conservation status
- Secure (NatureServe)

Scientific classification
- Kingdom: Plantae
- Clade: Tracheophytes
- Clade: Angiosperms
- Clade: Monocots
- Clade: Commelinids
- Order: Poales
- Family: Poaceae
- Subfamily: Pooideae
- Genus: Pappostipa
- Species: P. speciosa

Binomial name
- Pappostipa speciosa (Trin. & Rupr.) Romasch.

Synonyms
- Achnatherum speciosum (Trin. & Rupr.) Barkworth; Achnatherum speciosum Bubani, nom. nud.; Jarava speciosa (Trin. & Rupr.) Peñail.; Stipa californica Vasey; Stipa humilis var. speciosa (Trin. & Rupr.) Kuntze; Stipa speciosa Trin. & Rupr.; Stipa tehuelches Speg.

= Pappostipa speciosa =

Species of plant

Pappostipa speciosa (synonyms Stipa speciosa and Achnatherum speciosum) is a species of grass known by the common name desert needlegrass. It is native to much of the south-western United States from California and Oregon to Colorado and to northwestern Mexico, where it grows in dry areas, especially sagebrush habitat. It is also native to Argentina and Chile in South America.

== Description ==
This is a short perennial bunchgrass reaching a maximum height of 1–2 ft. The leaf blades are less than a millimeter wide and rolled along the edges. The bases are stiff and remain as the dense grass clump dries. The inflorescence is up to about 2 inches long and is dense and fluffy. Each spikelet is very hairy and has a bent awn up to about a centimeter long which is coated in long hairs.

The stiff awn and the sharp tip of the spikelet make the seeds hazardous for animals. The hairs on the seed help in catch in animal coats and drift on the wind for dispersal. The awn also twists when wet, helping the seed bury itself in the soil.
