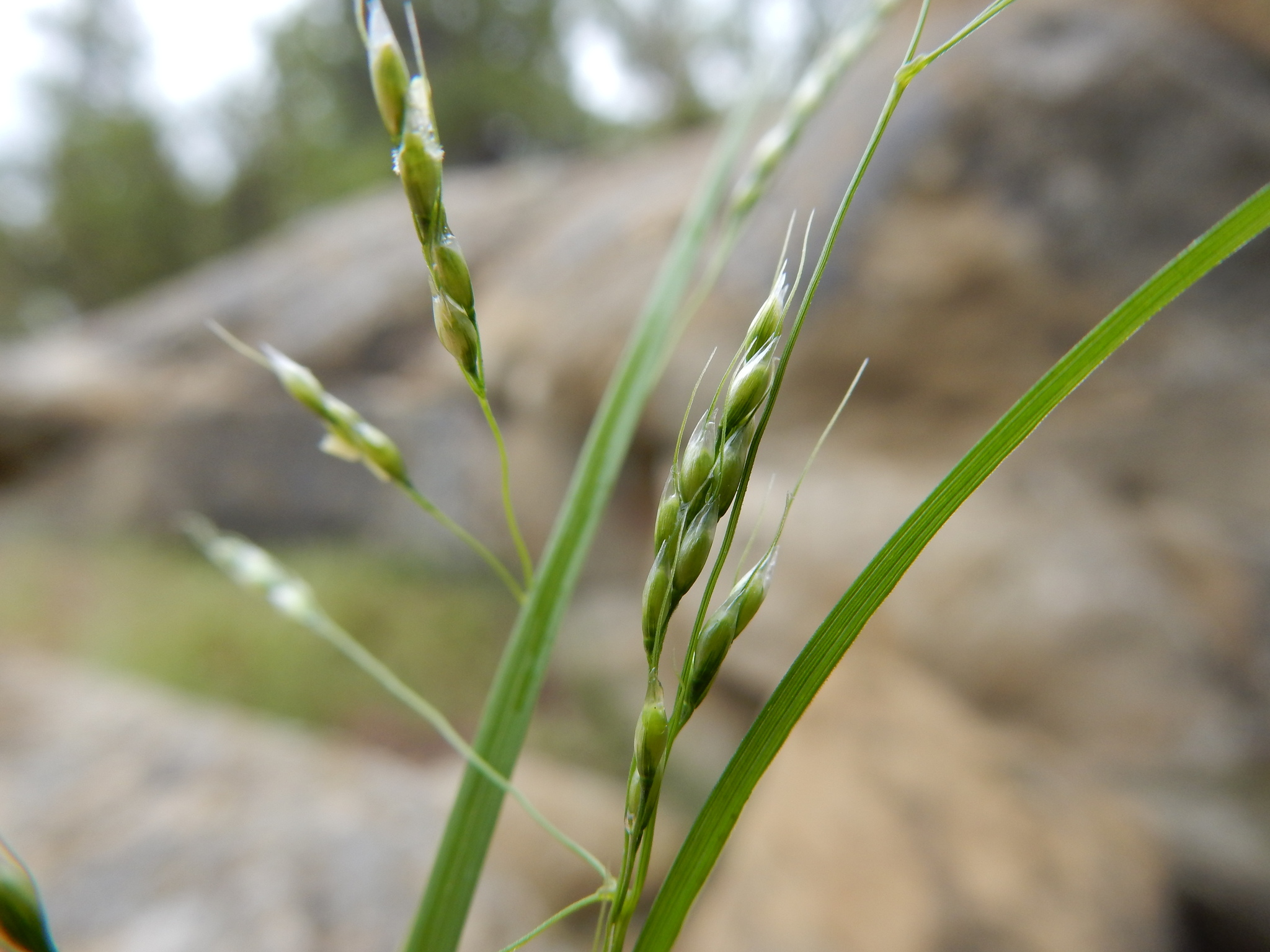
- Piptatheropsis micrantha

Scientific classification
- Kingdom: Plantae
- Clade: Tracheophytes
- Clade: Angiosperms
- Clade: Monocots
- Clade: Commelinids
- Order: Poales
- Family: Poaceae
- Subfamily: Pooideae
- Supertribe: Stipodae
- Tribe: Stipeae
- Genus: Piptatheropsis; Romasch., P.M.Peterson & Soreng

Type species
- Piptatheropsis canadensis (Poir.) Romasch., P.M. Peterson & Soreng

= Piptatheropsis =

Genus of grasses

Piptatheropsis is a genus of plants in the grass family.

Piptatheropsis is a newly recognized genus, named in 2011, comprising species formerly considered members of Milium, Oryzopsis, Piptatherum, Stipa, and similar genera.

Species

- Piptatheropsis canadensis (Poir.) Romasch., P.M.Peterson & Soreng - Canada (BC to LAB), northeastern United States (ME NH NY MI WI MN WV)
- Piptatheropsis exigua (Thurb.) Romasch., P.M.Peterson & Soreng - western North America (ABT BC CO ID MT OR WA WY CAL NV UT)
- Piptatheropsis micrantha (Trin. & Rupr.) Romasch., P.M.Peterson & Soreng - western North America (ABT BC MAN SAS CO ID MT WY ND NE OK SD AZ CAL NV UT NM TX)
- Piptatheropsis pungens (Torr. ex Spreng.) Romasch., P.M.Peterson & Soreng - Canada (BC to LAB plus NWT + YUK), United States (Northeast, Great Lakes, Black Hills of SD + WY, Rocky Mountains of CO + NM)
- Piptatheropsis shoshoneana (Curto & Douglass M.Hend.) Romasch., P.M.Peterson & Soreng - Idaho, Nevada
