= María Amelia Torres =

Argentine botanist (1934–2011)

María Amelia Torres (27 January 1934, in Tandil – 28 February 2011, in La Plata) was an Argentine botanist and agrostologist. She was an authority on the Poaceae family of grasses with an emphasis on the Nassella and the Stipa genera. The Amelichloa genus was named in her honour.
