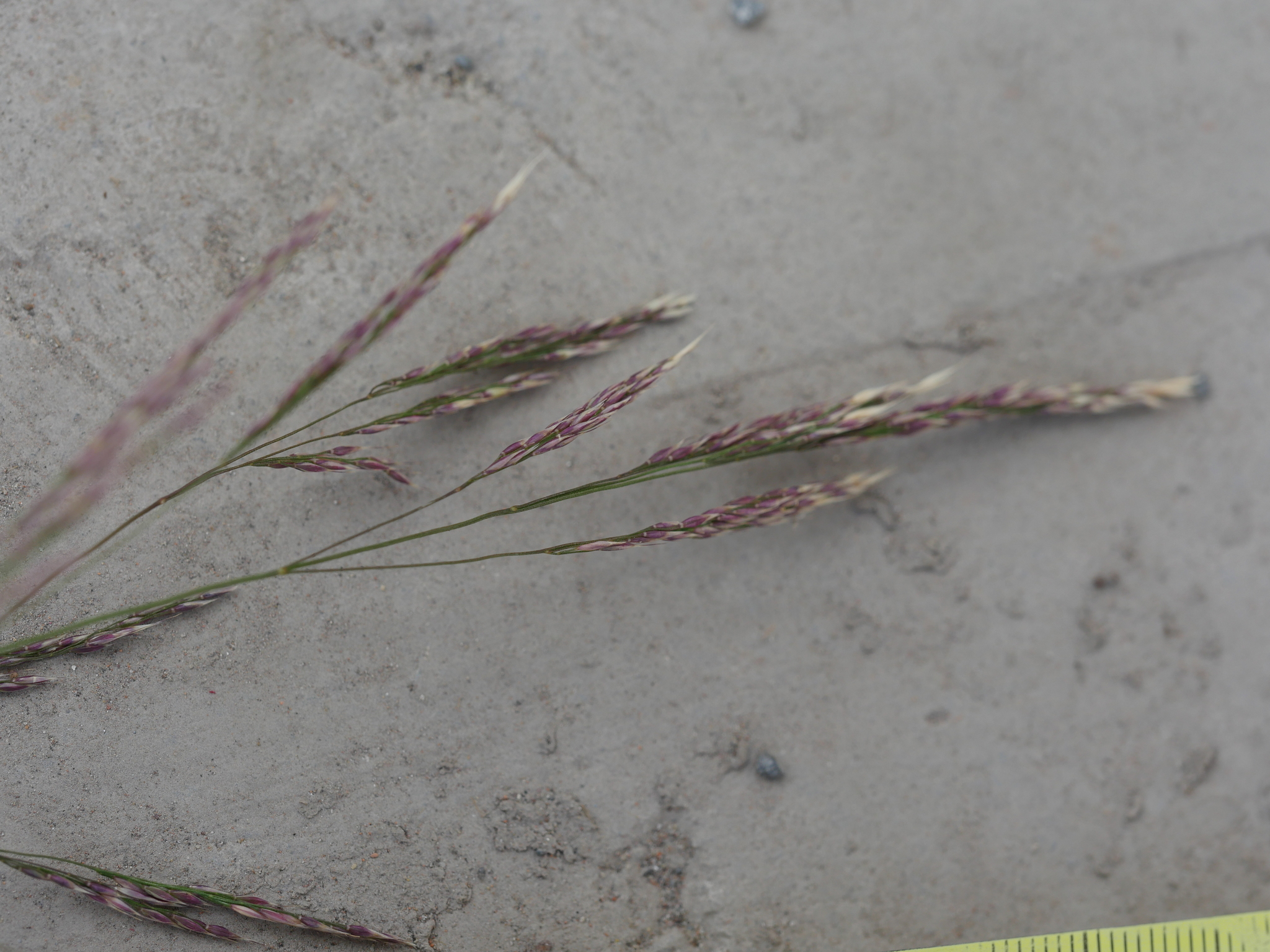
- Oloptum miliaceum

Scientific classification
- Kingdom: Plantae
- Clade: Tracheophytes
- Clade: Angiosperms
- Clade: Monocots
- Clade: Commelinids
- Order: Poales
- Family: Poaceae
- Subfamily: Pooideae
- Supertribe: Stipodae
- Tribe: Stipeae
- Genus: Oloptum; Röser & Hamasha

= Oloptum =

Genus of plants

Oloptum is a genus of flowering plants belonging to the family Poaceae.

Its native range is Macaronesia, Mediterranean to Iran.

Species:

- Oloptum miliaceum (L.) Röser & Hamasha
- Oloptum thomasii (Duby) Banfi & Galasso
