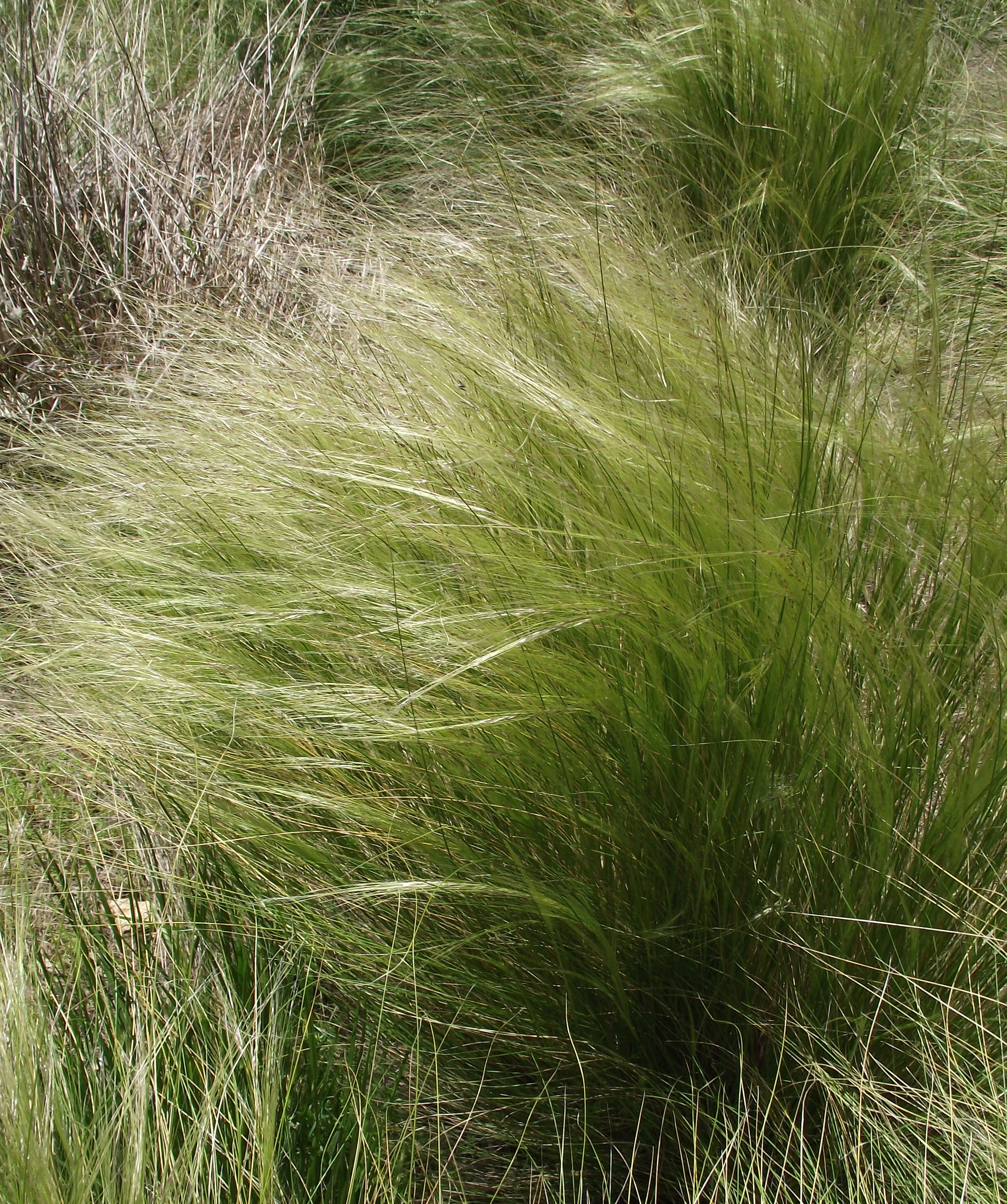
- Jarava ichu

Scientific classification
- Kingdom: Plantae
- Clade: Tracheophytes
- Clade: Angiosperms
- Clade: Monocots
- Clade: Commelinids
- Order: Poales
- Family: Poaceae
- Subfamily: Pooideae
- Supertribe: Stipodae
- Tribe: Stipeae
- Genus: Jarava; Ruiz et Pav., 1794

Species
- See text

= Jarava =

Genus of grasses

Jarava is a genus in the subfamily Pooideae of the grass family Poaceae. It is native to Central and South America.

== Species ==
- Jarava academica
- Jarava ambigua
- Jarava ameghinoi
- Jarava annua
- Jarava arenicola
- Jarava arundinacea
- Jarava atacamensis
- Jarava barrancaensis
- Jarava bertrandii
- Jarava brachychaeta
- Jarava braun-blanquetii
- Jarava brevipes
- Jarava breviseta
- Jarava castellanosii
- Jarava caudata
- Jarava chrysophylla
- Jarava chubutensis
- Jarava durifolia
- Jarava eriostachya
- Jarava frigida
- Jarava hieronymusii
- Jarava humilis
- Jarava hypsophila
- Jarava hystricina
- Jarava ibarii
- Jarava ichia
- Jarava ichu
- Jarava illimanica
- Jarava juncoides
- Jarava leptostachya
- Jarava macbridei
- Jarava maeviae
- Jarava malalhuensis
- Jarava mattheii
- Jarava media
- Jarava megapotamica
- Jarava milleana
- Jarava nana
- Jarava neaei
- Jarava nicorae
- Jarava pachypus
- Jarava parodiana
- Jarava patagonica
- Jarava plumosa
- Jarava plumosula
- Jarava pogonathera
- Jarava polyclada
- Jarava pseudoichu
- Jarava psylantha
- Jarava pugionata
- Jarava pungens
- Jarava ruiz-lealii
- Jarava scabrifolia
- Jarava scirpea
- Jarava semperiana
- Jarava sorianoi
- Jarava speciosa
- Jarava subaristata
- Jarava subnitida
- Jarava subplumosa
- Jarava tortuosa
- Jarava usitata
- Jarava vaginata
- Jarava vatroensis
