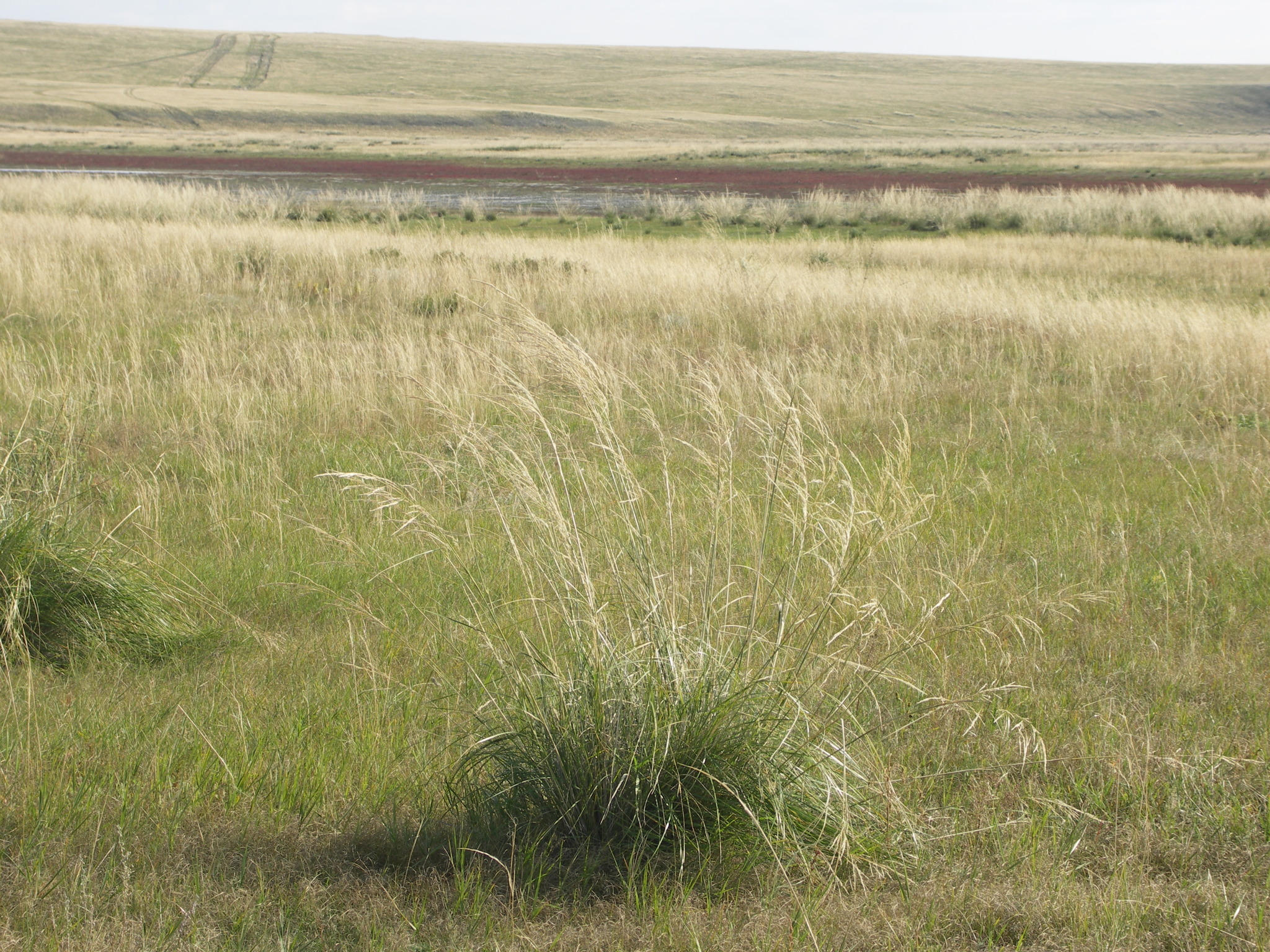
- Neotrinia splendens

Scientific classification
- Kingdom: Plantae
- Clade: Tracheophytes
- Clade: Angiosperms
- Clade: Monocots
- Clade: Commelinids
- Order: Poales
- Family: Poaceae
- Subfamily: Pooideae
- Tribe: Stipeae
- Genus: Neotrinia (Tzvelev) M.Nobis, P.D.Gudkova & A.Nowak

Type species
- Neotrinia splendens (Trin.) M.Nobis, P.D.Gudkova & A.Nowak

= Neotrinia =

Genus of grasses

Neotrinia is a genus of grasses in the family Poaceae. The genus is named after Russian German botanist Carl Bernhard von Trinius.

Species

- Neotrinia chitralensis (Bor) M.Nobis
- Neotrinia splendens (Trin.) M.Nobis, P.D.Gudkova & A.Nowak
