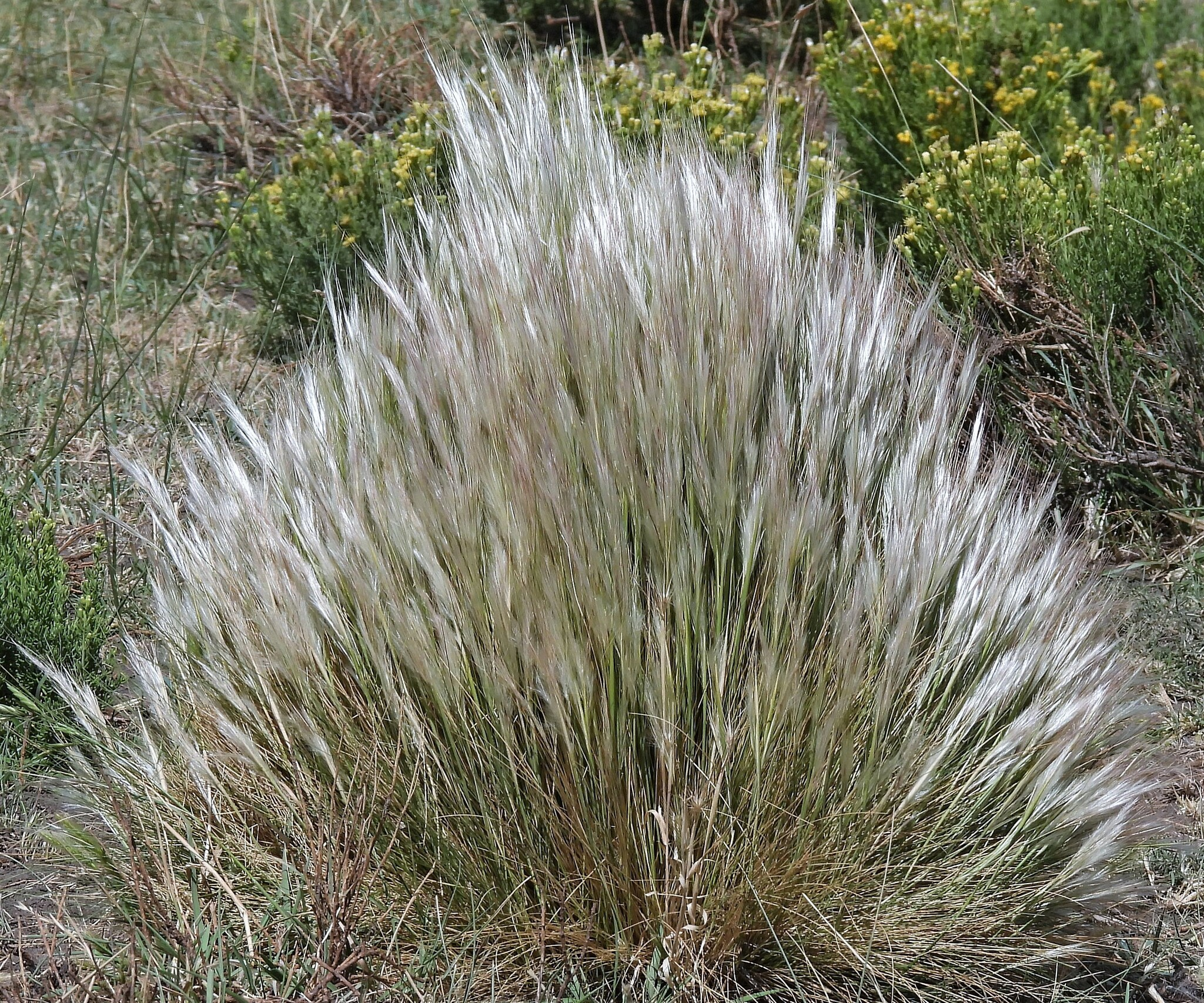
- P. humilis in Chubut, Argentina

Scientific classification
- Kingdom: Plantae
- Clade: Tracheophytes
- Clade: Angiosperms
- Clade: Monocots
- Clade: Commelinids
- Order: Poales
- Family: Poaceae
- Subfamily: Pooideae
- Supertribe: Stipodae
- Tribe: Stipeae
- Genus: Pappostipa (Speg.) Romasch., P.M.Peterson & Soreng

= Pappostipa =

Genus of plants

Pappostipa is a genus of flowering plants belonging to the family Poaceae.

Its native range is Western and Southern Central USA to Northwestern Mexico, Peru to Southern South America.

Species:

- Pappostipa ameghinoi (Speg.) Romasch.
- Pappostipa arenicola (F.A.Roig) Ciald.
- Pappostipa atacamensis (Parodi) Romasch.
- Pappostipa braun-blanquetii (F.A.Roig) Romasch.
- Pappostipa choconensis (F.A.Roig) Ciald.
- Pappostipa chrysophylla (É.Desv.) Romasch.
- Pappostipa chubutensis (Speg.) Romasch.
- Pappostipa colloncurensis (F.A.Roig) Ciald.
- Pappostipa frigida (Phil.) Romasch.
- Pappostipa hieronymusii (Pilg.) Romasch.
- Pappostipa humilis (Cav.) Romasch.
- Pappostipa ibarii (Phil.) Romasch.
- Pappostipa jucunda (F.A.Roig) Ciald.
- Pappostipa kieslingii (F.A.Roig) Ciald.
- Pappostipa maeviae (F.A.Roig) Romasch.
- Pappostipa major (Speg.) Romasch.
- Pappostipa malalhuensis (F.A.Roig) Romasch.
- Pappostipa mapuche (F.A.Roig) Ciald.
- Pappostipa marqueziana (F.A.Roig) Ciald.
- Pappostipa nana (Speg.) Romasch.
- Pappostipa nicorae (F.A.Roig) Romasch.
- Pappostipa parodiana (F.A.Roig) Romasch.
- Pappostipa patagonica (Speg.) Romasch.
- Pappostipa ruiz-lealii (F.A.Roig) Romasch.
- Pappostipa semperiana (F.A.Roig) Romasch.
- Pappostipa sorianoi (Parodi) Romasch.
- Pappostipa speciosa (Trin. & Rupr.) Romasch.
- Pappostipa vaginata (Phil.) Romasch.
- Pappostipa vatroensis (F.A.Roig) Romasch.
- Pappostipa zulmae (F.A.Roig) Ciald.
