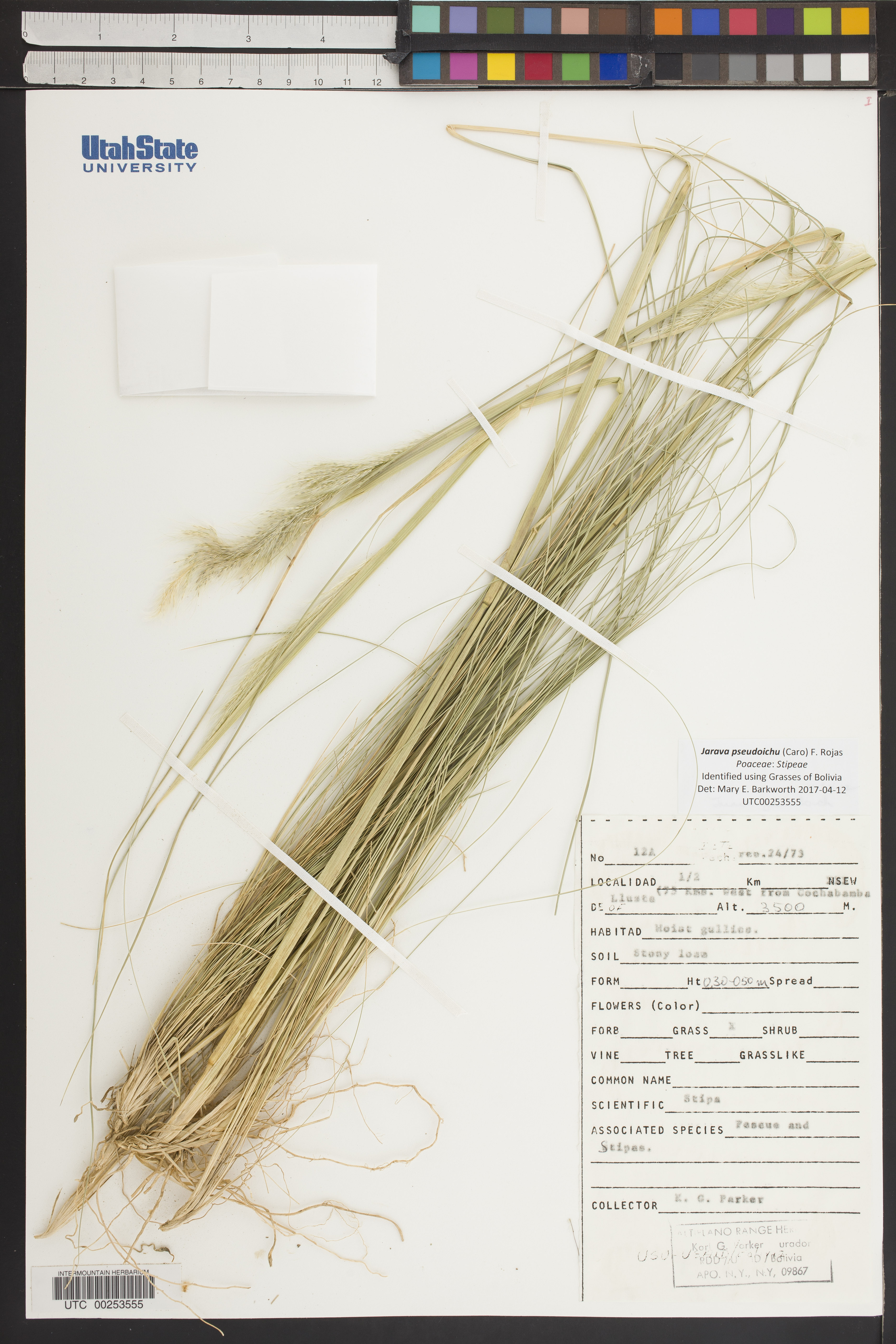

Scientific classification
- Kingdom: Plantae
- Clade: Tracheophytes
- Clade: Angiosperms
- Clade: Monocots
- Clade: Commelinids
- Order: Poales
- Family: Poaceae
- Subfamily: Pooideae
- Genus: Jarava
- Species: J. pseudoichu

Binomial name
- Jarava pseudoichu (Caro) F.Rojas

Synonyms
- Stipa pseudoichu Caro

= Jarava pseudoichu =

Species of grass

Jarava pseudoichu is a species of grass in the family Poaceae, disjunctly distributed in Colombia, Venezuela, Bolivia and Argentina. As its synonym Stipa pseudoichu it has gained the Royal Horticultural Society's Award of Garden Merit as an ornamental.
