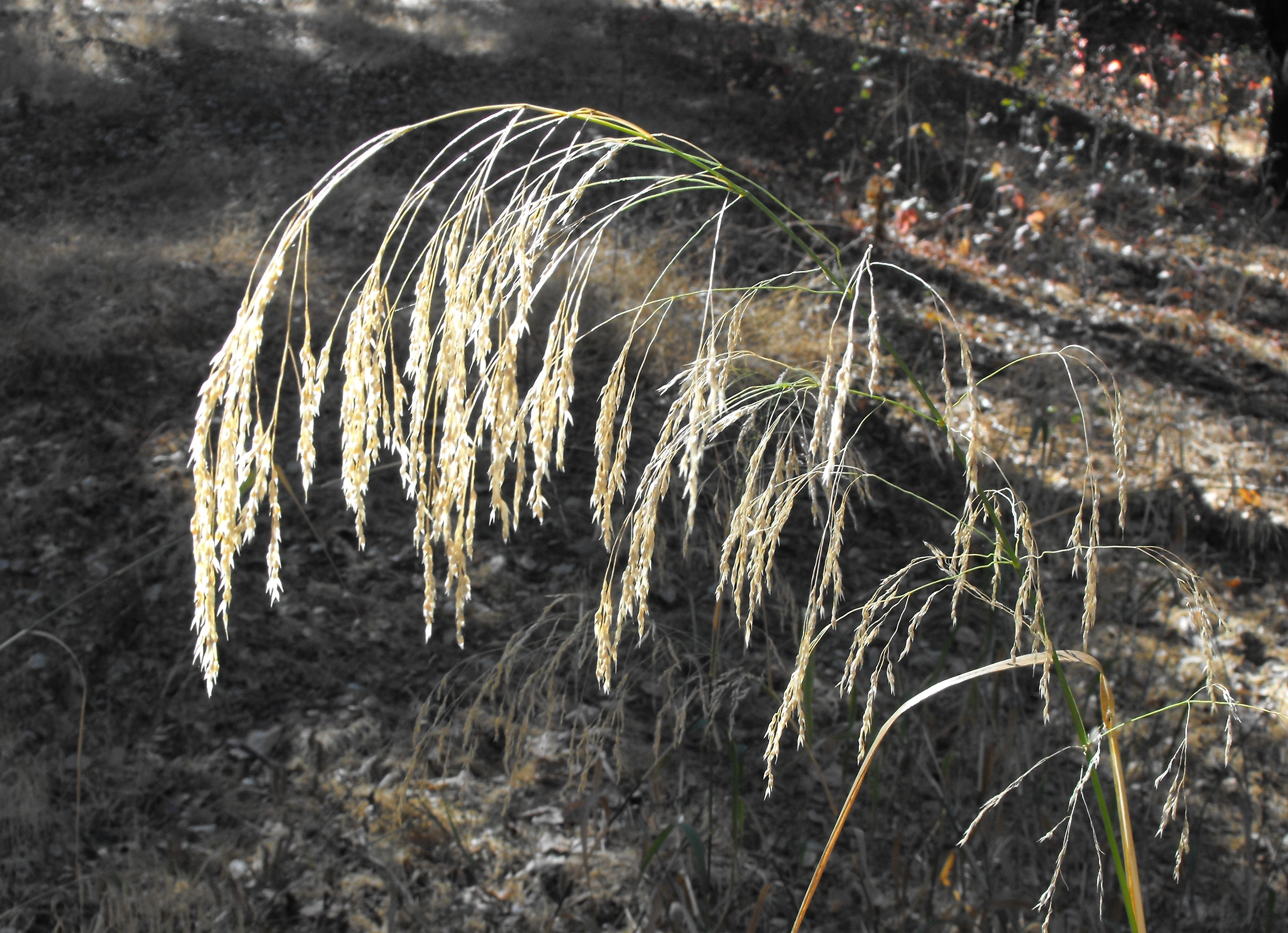

Scientific classification
- Kingdom: Plantae
- Clade: Tracheophytes
- Clade: Angiosperms
- Clade: Monocots
- Clade: Commelinids
- Order: Poales
- Family: Poaceae
- Subfamily: Pooideae
- Genus: Oloptum
- Species: O. miliaceum

Binomial name
- Oloptum miliaceum (L.) Röser & Hamasha

Synonyms
- Piptatherum miliaceum (L.) Coss.; Oryzopsis miliacea (L.) Asch. & Schweinf.; Stipa miliacea (L.) Hoover

= Oloptum miliaceum =

Species of grass

Oloptum miliaceum is a species of grass known by the common name smilograss. It is native to Eurasia but it can be found in many other parts of the world as an introduced species and a casual weed of disturbed areas. It is a clumping perennial grass producing sturdy, erect stems that can reach 1.5 meters tall. The inflorescence is a panicle of several whorls of branches that divide into secondary branches bearing clusters of spikelets.
