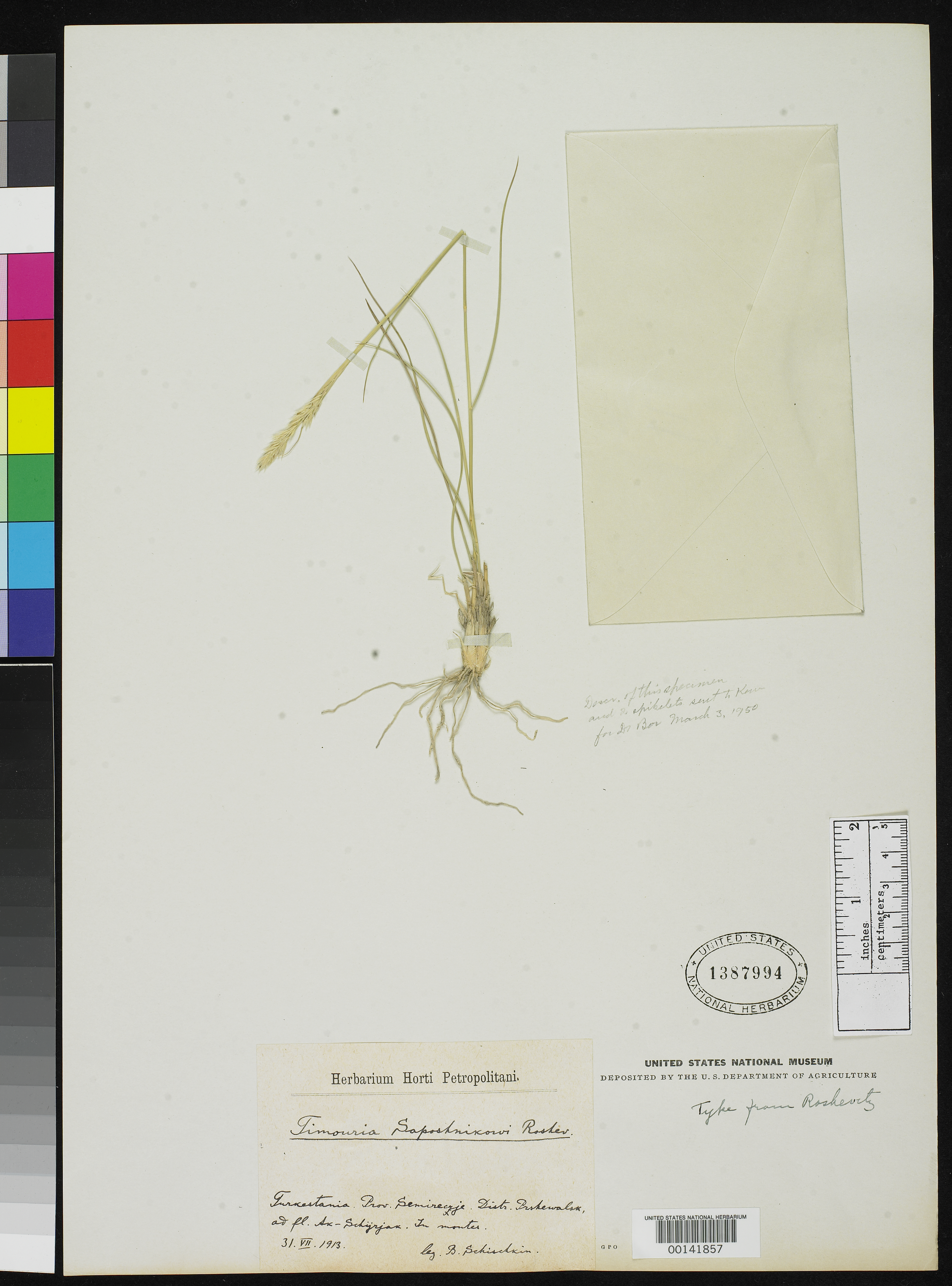
- Timouria saposhnikowi

Scientific classification
- Kingdom: Plantae
- Clade: Tracheophytes
- Clade: Angiosperms
- Clade: Monocots
- Clade: Commelinids
- Order: Poales
- Family: Poaceae
- Clade: BOP clade
- Subfamily: Pooideae
- Supertribe: Stipodae
- Tribe: Stipeae
- Genus: Timouria; Roshev.

= Timouria =

Genus of plants

Timouria is a genus of flowering plants belonging to the family Poaceae.

It contains two species:

- Timouria conferta (Poir.) Sennikov
- Timouria saposhnikowii Roshev.

Its native range is Central Asia to Mongolia and North China.
