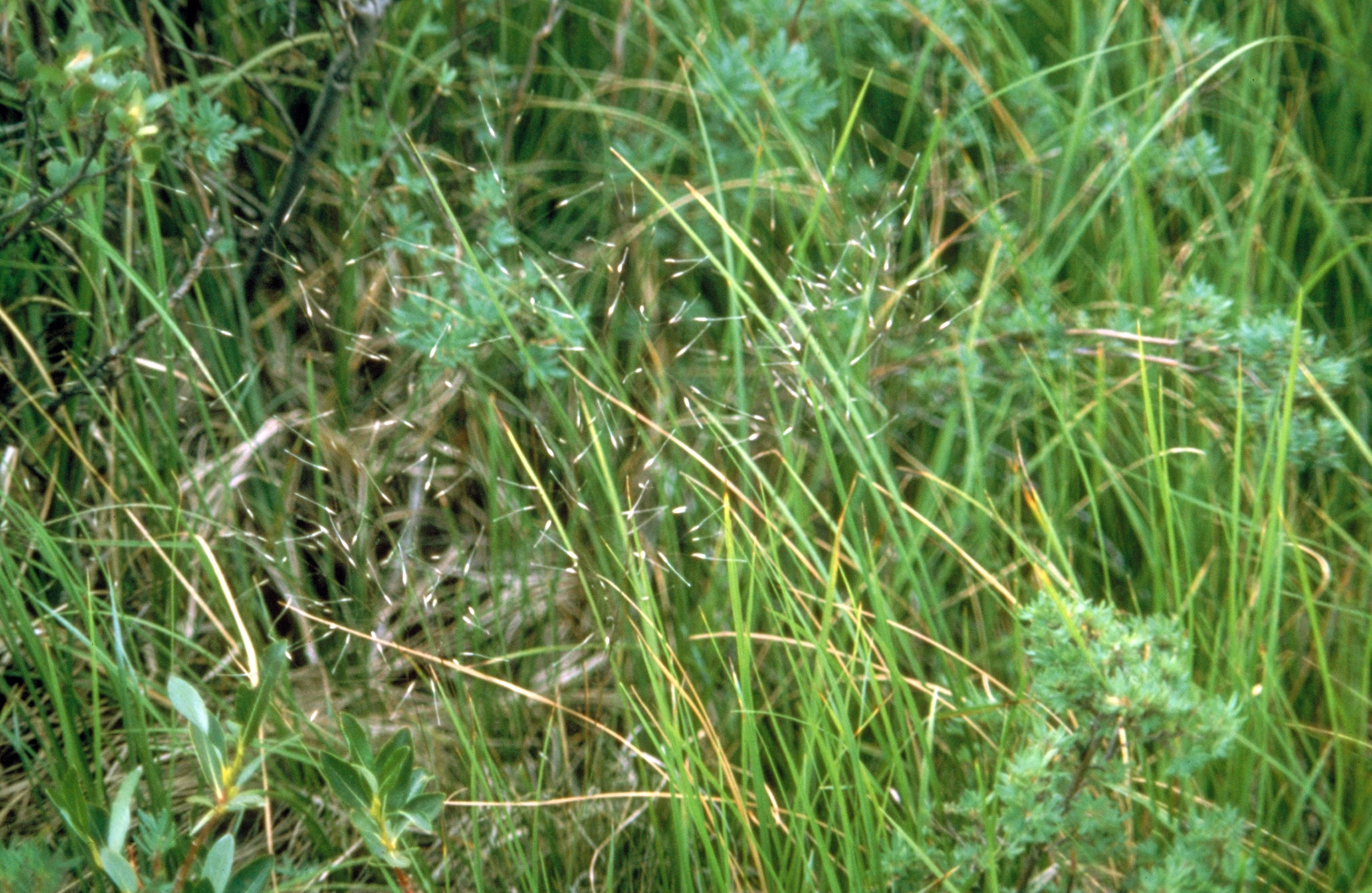
- Ptilagrostis porteri

Scientific classification
- Kingdom: Plantae
- Clade: Tracheophytes
- Clade: Angiosperms
- Clade: Monocots
- Clade: Commelinids
- Order: Poales
- Family: Poaceae
- Subfamily: Pooideae
- Supertribe: Stipodae
- Tribe: Stipeae
- Genus: Ptilagrostis; Griseb.

Type species
- Ptilagrostis mongholica (Turcz. ex Trin.) Griseb.

Synonyms
- Stipa sect. Ptilagrostis (Grisebach) Hackel.

= Ptilagrostis =

False needlegrasses

Genus of grasses

Ptilagrostis is a genus of grasses in the family Poaceae. They are distributed in Asia and North America. They are known commonly as false needlegrasses.

Plants of this genus were originally separated from the genus Stipa, and their relationship to that genus is still unclear. Some authorities still include them in Stipa, sometimes classifying Ptilagrostis as a section of that genus. Some species are difficult to separate, being intermediate in form.

Most Ptilagrostis are variable plants. Many species have several forms and variants. The genus is characterized in part by the papery, toothed lemmas of the spikelets, which have bent, plume-haired awns and do not overlap. This character separates the genus from Stipa and another close relative, the genus Achnatherum. Ptilagrostis species are generally tufted perennial grasses with erect stems. The spikelets are borne in an open or somewhat open panicle. Each has one flower. The awn is twisted and bent once or twice.

Species

- Ptilagrostis alpina - Russia (Khabarovsk, Amur Oblast, Zabaykalsky Krai)
- Ptilagrostis concinna - Gansu, Qinghai, Shaanxi, Sichuan, Xinjiang, Tibet, Yunnan, Sikkim, Kyrgyzstan, Tajikistan, Jammu-Kashmir, Himachal Pradesh, Nepal, Bhutan, Arunachal Pradesh
- Ptilagrostis dichotoma - Gansu, Inner Mongolia, Qinghai, Shaanxi, Sichuan, Tibet, Yunnan, Bhutan, Sikkim, Nepal, India
- Ptilagrostis junatovii - Altai Krai, Zabaykalsky Krai, Tuva, Irkutsk Oblast, Kazakhstan, Tibet, Xinjiang, Mongolia
- Ptilagrostis kingii - Sierra Nevada in California
- Ptilagrostis luquensis - Gansu, Qinghai, Sichuan, Tibet
- Ptilagrostis malyschevii - Kyrgyzstan, Tajikistan, Kazakhstan
- Ptilagrostis milleri - Sikkim, Bhutan
- Ptilagrostis mongholica - Gansu, Hebei, Heilongjiang, Jilin, Liaoning, Inner Mongolia, Qinghai, Shaanxi, Shanxi, Sichuan, Xinjiang, Yunnan, Bhutan, Jammu-Kashmir, Mongolia, Nepal, Siberia
- Ptilagrostis pellioti - Gansu, Inner Mongolia, Ningxia, Qinghai, Xinjiang, Mongolia
- Ptilagrostis porteri - Rocky Mountains of Colorado + New Mexico
- Ptilagrostis schischkinii - Xinjiang
- Ptilagrostis yadongensis - Tibet

formerly included

see Stipa

- Ptilagrostis tianschanica - Stipa tianschanica
