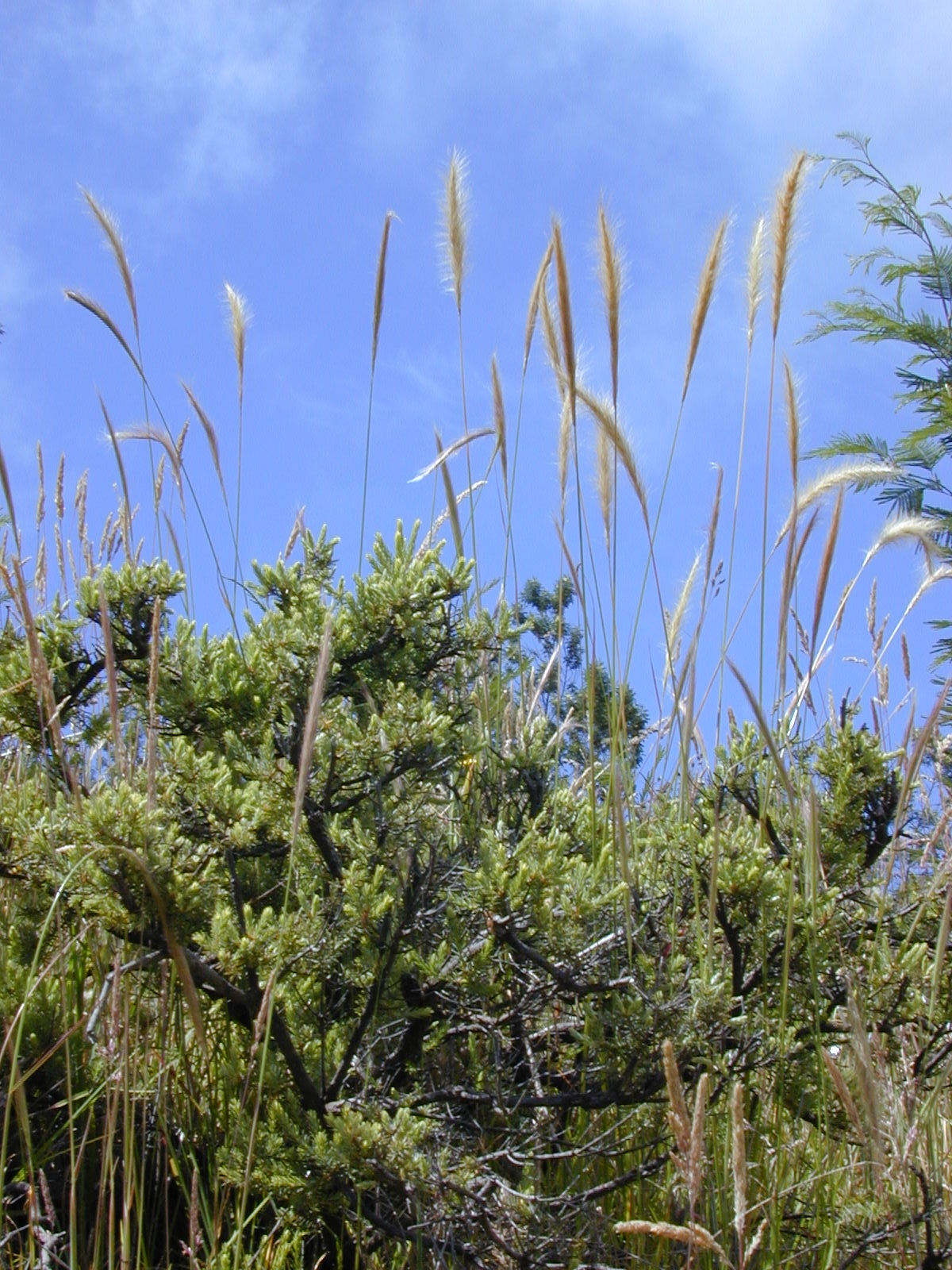

Scientific classification
- Kingdom: Plantae
- Clade: Tracheophytes
- Clade: Angiosperms
- Clade: Monocots
- Clade: Commelinids
- Order: Poales
- Family: Poaceae
- Subfamily: Pooideae
- Genus: Dichelachne
- Species: D. crinita

Binomial name
- Dichelachne crinita (L.f.) Hook.f.

= Dichelachne crinita =

Species of grass

Dichelachne crinita , commonly known as the longhair plume grass, is a type of grass found in Australia, New Zealand and islands of the Pacific Ocean. It is often seen on sandy soils near the sea as well as woodlands. The flowering panicles are open and feathery at maturity. The grass may grow up to 1.5 metres (5 ft) tall. Crinita, the specific epithet, is derived from Latin (hairy).

== Taxonomy ==
Carolus Linnaeus the Younger described the longhair plume grass in his Supplementum Plantarum in 1781 as Anthoxanthum crinitum. Crinita is derived from the verb crinio "I cover with hair" and refers to the hairy panicles. Joseph Dalton Hooker gave it its current name in 1853. Longhair plumegrass is the common name in Australia, while clovenfoot plumegrass is a name recorded in America.

== Description ==
The longhair plume grass is a tufted perennial plant which can reach 1.5 m (5 ft) high. The flowers are roughly oblong-shaped or cylindrical panicles and appear in spring.

== Distribution and habitat ==
The longhair plume grass is native to all states of Australia, New Guinea, Norfolk Island, the Kermadec Islands and New Zealand. It is unclear whether it is native or naturalised on Lord Howe Island. It has become naturalised on Maui in the Hawaiian Islands. It grows on sandy or sandstone-based soils.

Within the Sydney region, it is found in grassland to open forest communities, associated with woodland trees such as smooth-barked apple (Angophora costata), Sydney peppermint (Eucalyptus piperita), silvertop ash (E. sieberi) and red bloodwood (Corymbia gummifera), in scrub with coastal banksia (Banksia integrifolia) and broad-leaved apple (Angophora subvelutina). It is a component of the Endangered Eastern Suburbs Banksia Scrub, and shale/sandstone transition forest.

In Victoria, it is common near coastal regions and on volcanic plains.

In South Australia, it is associated with such trees as drooping sheoak (Allocasuarina verticillata), pink gum (Eucalyptus fasciculosa), sugar gum (E. cladocalyx), messmate (E. obliqua), and shrubs such as golden wattle (Acacia pycnantha) and peach heath (Lissanthe strigosa).
