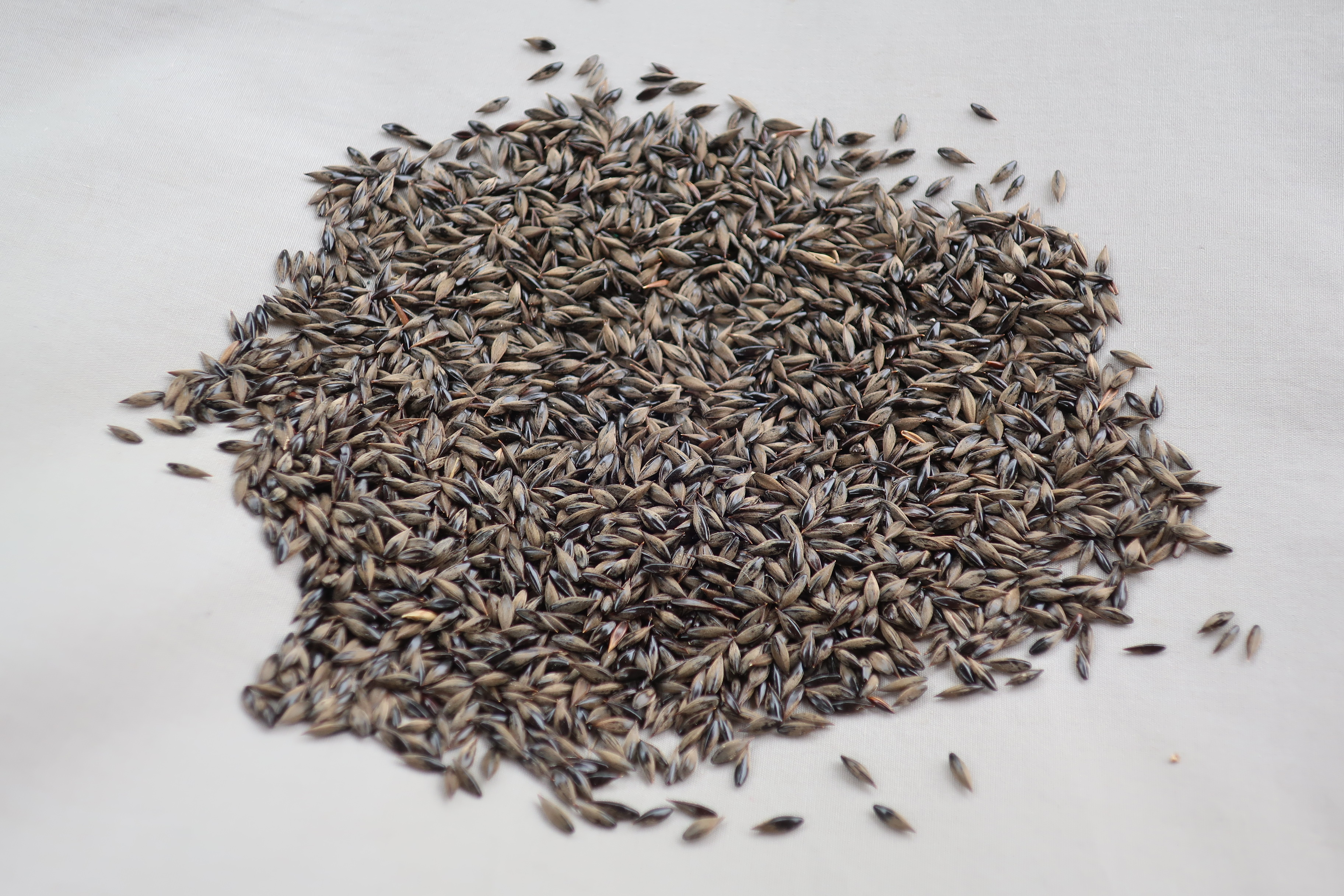
- Hairy millet grass seeds (Piptatherum holciforme)

Scientific classification
- Kingdom: Plantae
- Clade: Tracheophytes
- Clade: Angiosperms
- Clade: Monocots
- Clade: Commelinids
- Order: Poales
- Family: Poaceae
- Subfamily: Pooideae
- Genus: Piptatherum
- Species: P. holciforme

Binomial name
- Piptatherum holciforme (M.Bieb.) Roem. & Schult.

Synonyms
- Agrostis holciformis M.Bieb.; Milium coerulescens var. holciforme (M. Bieb.) Regel; Milium holciforme (M.Bieb.) Spreng.; Oryzopsis coerulescens var. grandis Pamp.; Oryzopsis grandis (Pamp.) Maire & Weiller; Oryzopsis holciformis (M.Bieb.) Hack.; Oryzopsis holciformis var. glabra (Freitag) D.Heller; Oryzopsis kopetdaghensis Roshev.; Piptatherum holciforme var. glabrum Freitag; Piptatherum karataviense Roshev.; Urachne holciformis (M.Bieb.) K.Koch; Urachne sinaica Steud.

= Piptatherum holciforme =

Species of grass

Piptatherum holciforme is an Old World species of cereal grass known by the common names rice grass, hairy ricegrass, and hairy millet grass. The seed of the plant is a type of grain millet.

== Description ==
Piptatherum holciforme is perennial and stands erect about 50–80 centimetres (20–31 in). Dissected leaves branch from its base, growing in clusters of several propagation runners. The stems are sessile, slightly tilting forward because of the weight of the inflorescence, each made up of 3–4 internodes.

The grains are borne upon a panicle, consisting of spikelets with a short caducous awn; each grain being ovoid in shape, pointed at one end and having a shiny black appearance. Each seedling bears micro-hairs. The seed and the lower chaff that encloses the seed reach a length of 1–1.5 cm, without the awn (spikelets), making them the largest and longest of all species of Piptatherum that grow in Israel.

== Taxonomy ==
The plant was first described in 1808 by the German botanist Friedrich August Freiherr Marschall von Bieberstein as belonging to the taxon Agrostis holciformis. The plant's modern taxonomic name was described in 1817 by the Swiss botanist and entomologist Johann Jacob Roemer and his colleague, the Austrian botanist Josef August Schultes.

== Habitat and distribution ==
Piptatherum holciforme grows in waste habitats, along waysides, and adapts well in moist, stony chalkstone soils in Mediterranean scrubland. Its global distribution extends across Europe, North Africa and the Middle East.

== Uses ==
To what extent the cereal grass was cultivated in the past by indigenous peoples is now unclear, owing to the multiple varieties of millet and panic. Ohalo, a Paleolithic hunter-gatherer archaeological site in Galilee, along the shore of the Sea of Galilee, revealed a storage facility where the grains of hairy millet grass, along with other grains, had been stored. In Israel, seedlings of hairy millet grass are sometimes used to reseed marginal land for pasture.

The millet can be ground into meal and prepared as a porridge.

== In culture ==
In classical Hebrew literature, the plant falls under the generic classification of "millet" (Hebrew: דוחן), one of the cereal grasses, and is probably the naqlivas (Hebrew: נקליבס) mentioned in the Babylonian Talmud (Avodah Zarah) as once being used by idolaters.
