= Ptilagrostiella =

Scientific classification
- Kingdom: Plantae
- Clade: Tracheophytes
- Clade: Angiosperms
- Clade: Monocots
- Clade: Commelinids
- Order: Poales
- Family: Poaceae
- Subfamily: Pooideae
- Tribe: Stipeae
- Genus: Ptilagrostiella; Romasch., P.M.Peterson & Soreng
- Species: P. kingii

Binomial name
- Ptilagrostiella kingii (Bol.) Romasch.

Synonyms
- Oryzopsis kingii (Bol.) Beal; Ptilagrostis kingii (Bol.) Barkworth; Stipa kingii Bol.

Species of grass

Ptilagrostiella kingii is a species of grass known by the common names Sierra false needlegrass and King's ricegrass. It is the sole species in genus Ptialgrostiella. It is a perennial native to central and eastern California and to Tamaulipas in northeastern Mexico. In California it is found in the high mountains of the Sierra Nevada, where it grows in meadows and near streams in subalpine and alpine climates.

== Description ==
It is a tuft-forming perennial bunchgrass growing 20 to 40 centimeters tall with narrow, rolled leaves. The narrow inflorescence is made up of a few upright branches lined with spikelets. Each spikelet has an awn up to 1.4 centimeters long which may be bent.
