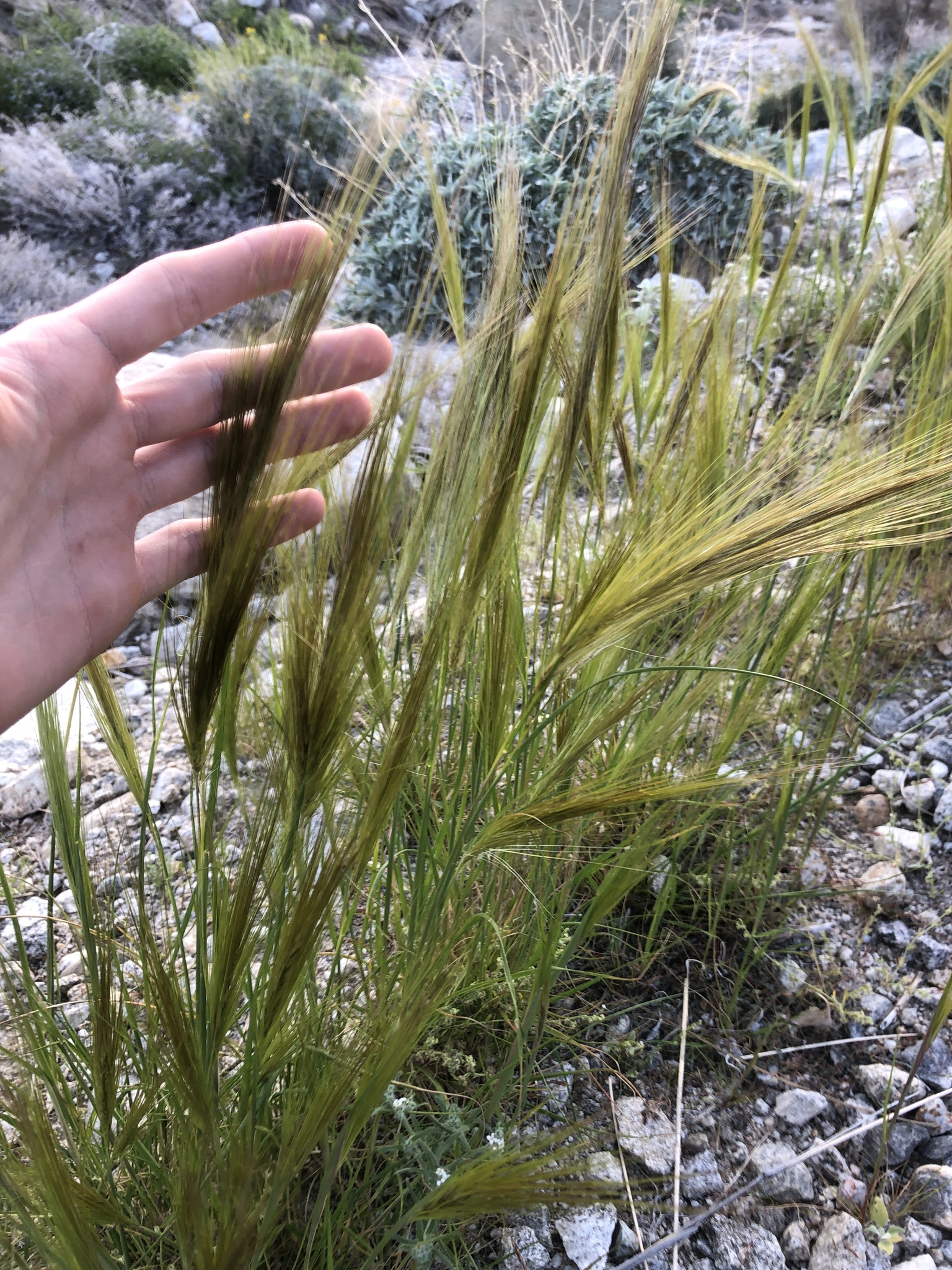
- Stipellula capensis

Scientific classification
- Kingdom: Plantae
- Clade: Tracheophytes
- Clade: Angiosperms
- Clade: Monocots
- Clade: Commelinids
- Order: Poales
- Family: Poaceae
- Genus: Stipellula; Röser & Hamasha

Synonyms
- Stipella (Tzvelev) Röser & Hamasha

= Stipellula =

Genus of plants

Stipellula is a genus of flowering plants belonging to the family Poaceae.

Its native range is Macaronesia, the Mediterranean to India, and Southern Africa.

Species:

- Stipellula capensis (Thunb.) Röser & Hamasha
- Stipellula magrebensis (F.M.Vázquez & Devesa) F.M.Vázquez
