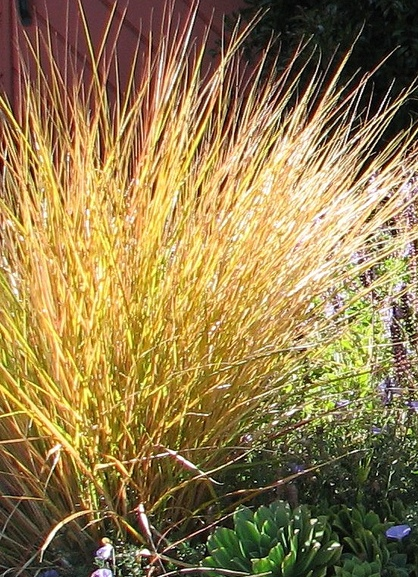

Scientific classification
- Kingdom: Plantae
- Clade: Tracheophytes
- Clade: Angiosperms
- Clade: Monocots
- Clade: Commelinids
- Order: Poales
- Family: Poaceae
- Subfamily: Pooideae
- Supertribe: Stipodae
- Tribe: Stipeae
- Genus: Anemanthele; Veldkamp
- Species: A. lessoniana

Binomial name
- Anemanthele lessoniana (Steud.) Veldkamp

Synonyms
- Agrostis lessoniana Steud.; Dichelachne procera Steud.; Oryzopsis lessoniana (Steud.) Veldkamp; Agrostis procera A.Rich.; Agrostis rigida R.Lesson ex A.Rich.; Apera arundinacea Hook.f.; Dichelachne rigida Steud.; Stipa arundinacea (Hook.f.) Benth.; Apera purpurascens Colenso; Oryzopsis rigida (Steud.) Zotov

= Anemanthele =

Genus of grasses

Anemanthele is a genus of plants in the grass family native to New Zealand.

The only known species is Anemanthele lessoniana, often called gossamer grass or New Zealand wind grass or pheasant's tail grass. This is a naturally rare grass in the wild but it is widely cultivated for use as an attractive ornamental garden plant. It is marginal in zone 8, going dormant and deciduous in cold winters, but usually evergreen to semi-evergreen. It has green arching foliage to 3 feet in USDA 8, with highlights of orange, copper, and gold, especially in drier soils.

This plant has gained the Royal Horticultural Society's Award of Garden Merit.
