= List of invasive plant species in the Northern Territory =

Numerous plants have been introduced to the Northern Territory of Australia since colonisation began in the 1860s. Many have become invasive species or noxious weeds which by definition compete with native plants and suppress the growth of indigenous populations of both plants and animals.

A weed is broadly considered to be a plant that requires some form of action to reduce its negative effects on the economy, the environment and human health or amenity. XXX weeds are declared under legislative controls to reduce their impacts.

== Weed classification ==
The Weeds Management Act 2001 defines three classes of weeds:

- Class A: to be eradicated
- Class B: control, growth and spread to be prevented
- Class C: prevent entry, not to be introduced into the Northern Territory

All class A and class B weeds are also included as class C weeds.

== Lists ==
=== Declared weeds ===
Botanical name	Common name	Declaration class
Alternanthera philoxeroides	Alligator weed	A
Andropogon gayanus	Gamba grass	A, B
Annona glabra	Pond apple	A
Asphodelus fistulosus	Onion weed	A
Austrocylindropuntia spp.	Opuntioid cacti	A
Barleria prionitis	Barleria	A
Cabomba spp.	Cabomba	A
Chrysanthemoides monilifera	Bitou bush, boneseed	A
Cryptostegia spp.	Rubber vines	A
Cylindropuntia spp.	Opuntioid cacti, rope cacti	A
Dalbergia sissoo	Longspine thornapple	A
Datura ferox	Dalbergia	A
Dolichandra unguis-cati syn. Macfadyena unguis-cati	Cat's claw creeper	A
Echium plantagineum	Paterson's curse	A
Eichhornia crassipes	Water hyacinth	A
Hyparrhenia rufa	Thatch grass	A
Jatropha curcas	Physic nut	A
Jatropha gossypiifolia	Bellyache bush	A, B
Lycium ferocissimum	African boxthorn	A
Martynia annua	Devil's claw	A
Mimosa pigra	Mimosa	A, B
Myriophyllum aquaticum	Parrot's feather	A
Nassella neesiana	Chilean needle grass	A
Nassella tenuissima	Mexican feather grass	A
Nassella trichotoma	Serrated tussock	A
Neptunia plena	Water mimosa	A
Neptunia oleraceae	Water mimosa	A
Opuntia spp.	Prickly pears	A
Parthenium hysterophorus	Parthenium weed	A
Pereskia aculeata	Leaf cactus	A
Prosopis spp.	Mesquite	A
Rubus fruticose agg.	Blackberry	A
Sagittaria platyphylla	Sagittaria	A
Salix spp.	Willows	A
Schinus terebinthifolius	Brazilian pepper	A, B
Senegalia catechu syn. Acacia catechu	Cutch tree	A
Tamarix aphylla	Athel pine	A, B
Ulex europaeus	Gorse	A
Vachellia nilotica syn. Acacia nilotica	Prickly acacia	A
Ziziphus mauritiana	Chinee apple, Indian jujube	A
Acanthospermum hispidum	Star burr, goat’s head	B
Alternanthera pungens	Khaki weed	B
Argemone ochroleuca	Mexican poppy	B
Azadirachta indica	Neem	B
Calotropis procera	Rubber bush	B
Carthamus lanatus	Saffron thistle	B
Cenchrus echinatus	Mossman River grass	B
Cenchrus polystachios Syn. Pennisetum polystachion	Mission grass (perennial)	B
Cenchrus setaceus	Fountain grass	B
Emex australis	Spiny emex	B
Hymenachne amplexicaulis	Olive hymenachne	B
Hyptis capitata	Knob weed	B
Hyptis suaveolens	Hyptis	B
Lantana camara	Common lantana	B
Lantana montevidensis	Creeping lantana	B
Leonotis nepetifolia	Lion's tail	B
Mimosa pudica	Common sensitive plant	B
Parkinsonia aculeata	Parkinsonia	B
Pistia stratiotes	Water lettuce	B
Ricinus communis	Castor oil plant	B
Salvinia molesta	Salvinia	B
Senna alata	Candle bush	B
Senna obtusifolia	Sicklepod	B
Senna occidentalis	Coffee senna	B
Sida acuta	Spinyhead sida	B
Sida cordifolia	Flannel weed	B
Sida rhombifolia	Paddy's lucerne	B
Stachytarpheta spp.	Snake weeds	B
Themeda quadrivalvis	Grader grass	B
Tribulus cistoides	Caltrop	B
Tribulus terrestris	Caltrop	B
Xanthium strumarium Syn. Xanthium occidentale	Noogoora burr	B
Xanthium spinosum	Bathurst burr	B
Acroptilon repens	Creeping knapweed	C
Ageratina riparia	Mistflower	C
Amaranthus dubius	Chinese spinach	C
Ambrosia artemisiifolia	Annual ragweed	C
Ambrosia psilostachya	Perennial ragweed	C
Anredera cordifolia	Madeira vine	C
Asparagus asparagoides	Bridal creeper	C
Asparagus scandens	Asparagus fern	C
Asparagus declinatus	Bridal veil	C
Asparagus aethiopicus	Ground asparagus	C
Asparagus africanus	Climbing asparagus	C
Asparagus plumosus syn. Asparagus setaceus	Climbing asparagus ferm	C
Austroeupatorium inulaefolium	Austroeupatorium	C
Baccharis halimifolia	Groundsel bush	C
Boerhavia erecta	Erect spiderling	C
Brachiaria paspaloides	Common signal grass	C
Chromolaena odorata	Siam weed	C
Clidemia hirta	Koster's curse	C
Coix aquatica	Job's tears	C
Croton hirtus	Hairy croton	C
Cytisus scoparius	Scotch broom	C
Datura spp.	Thornapples	C
Digitaria fuscescens	Common crabgrass	C
Digitaria insularis	Sourgrass	C
Diodia sarmentosa	Tropical buttonweed	C
Echinochloa glabrescens	Barnyard grass	C
Echinochloa stagnina	Burgu millet	C
Egeria densa	Dense waterweed	C
Elodea canadensis	Canadian pondweed	C
Equisetum spp.	Horsetails	C
Eriocaulon truncatum	Short pipewort	C
Eriocereus martinii	Harrisia cactus	C
Eriochloa polystachya	Carib grass	C
Fimbristylis umbellaris	Globular fimbristylis	C
Genista linifolia	Flax-leaved broom	C
Genista monspessulana	Montpellier broom	C
Hybanthus attenuatus	Western greenviolet	C
Hyptis brevipes	Lesser roundweed	C
Ischaemum timorense	Centipede grass	C
Kochia scoparia syn. Bassia scoparia	Burning bush	C
Lagarosiphon major	Lagarosiphon	C
Leptochloa chinensis	Red sprangletop, feathergrass	C
Leptochloa panicea	Sprangletop	C
Limnobium laevigatum	Amazon frogbit	C
Limnocharis flava	Yellow burrhead, yellow sawah lettuce	C
Miconia spp.	Velvet tree	C
Mikania cordata	Heartleaf hempvine	C
Mikania micrantha	Mikania, mile-a-minute	C
Mimosa invisa	Giant sensitive plant	C
Myriophyllum spicatum	Eurasian watermilfoil	C
Orobanche spp.	Broomrapes	C
Paederia foetida	Lesser Malayan stinkwort	C
Piper aduncum	Spiked pepper	C
Rhodomyrtus tomentosa	Downy rose myrtle	C
Rotala indica	Indian toothcup	C
Sacciolepis interrupta	Cupscale grass	C
Salvinia cucullata	Salvinia	C
Salvinia natans	Salvinia	C
Schoenoplectus juncoides	Rock bulrush	C
Scirpus maritimus Syn. Bolboschoenus maritimus	Sea clubrush	C
Senecio madagascariensis	Fireweed	C
Solanum elaeagnifolium	Silver leaf nightshade	C
Sorghum halepense	Johnson grass	C
Spermacoce mauritiana syn. Spermacoce exilis	Pacific false buttonweed	C
Striga spp.	Witchweeds	C
Trapa spp.	Floating water chestnuts	C
Xanthium spp.	Burrs	C
Cenchrus ciliaris	Buffel grass	Yet to be declared

== See also ==
- Weeds of National Significance
- Invasive species in Australia
