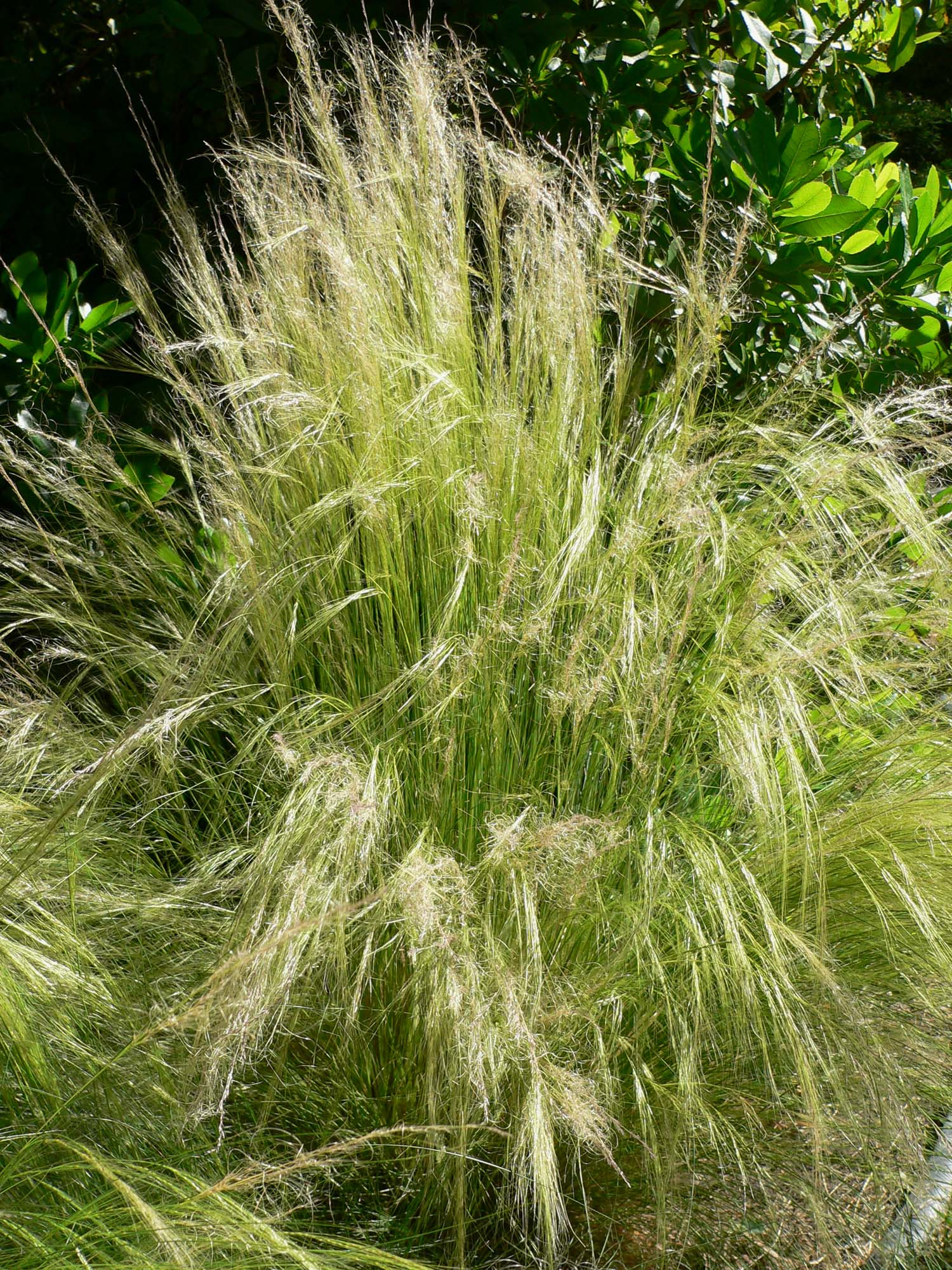
- Nassella tenuissima

Scientific classification
- Kingdom: Plantae
- Clade: Embryophytes
- Clade: Tracheophytes
- Clade: Angiosperms
- Clade: Monocots
- Clade: Commelinids
- Order: Poales
- Family: Poaceae
- Subfamily: Pooideae
- Supertribe: Stipodae
- Tribe: Stipeae
- Genus: Nassella (Trin.) É.Desv. (1854)

Type species
- Nassella pungens É.Desv.

Species
- Many, see text

= Nassella =

Genus of flowering plants

Nassella, or needlegrass, is a New World genus of over 100 perennial bunchgrasses found from North America through South America. The Latin word nassa refers to "a basket with a narrow neck". It is usually considered segregate from the genus Stipa and includes many New World species formerly classified in that genus. As of 2011, The Jepson Manual includes Nassella within Stipa.

Nasella is characterized by strongly overlapping lemma margins and reduced, veinless paleae. The lemma tips are fused into the "crown", a short membrane that surrounds the base of the lemma. The rim of the crown usually has hairs.

Many species form both cross-pollinating and self-pollinating florets in the terminal panicle. The self-pollinating florets have 1–3 small anthers; the cross-pollinating florets have 3 longer anthers. Some species have self-pollinating inflorescences hidden in their basal leaf sheaths. These hidden inflorescences lack glumes and usually lack awns.

Some species, especially Nassella neesiana and Nassella tenuissima, are considered invasive pests, as the grass is not properly digested by ruminants.

== Diversity ==
As of 2001, there were about 116 species in this genus.

=== California species ===
- Nassella pulchra – purple needlegrass; currently reclassified as Stipa pulchra.

- A native grass of California that was once a dominant species in California grasslands before invasive European grasses became dominant. The seeds were an important food source for many of the Indigenous peoples of California. Today, the bunchgrass is the State Grass of California and plays an important role in native grassland restoration and erosion control.

- Nassella lepida – foothill needlegrass; currently reclassified as Stipa lepida.

- A native bunchgrass of California and Baja California.

- Nassella cernua – nodding needlegrass; currently reclassified as Stipa cernua.

- A native bunchgrass of California, Northwestern Mexico, and the Western United States.

=== Horticultural species ===
- Nassella tenuissima – Mexican feathergrass.

- An attractive, drought-tolerant bunchgrass with fine leaves and a narrow inflorescence that sways gracefully in the wind. However, it readily escapes from cultivation and takes hold in disturbed areas, natural areas, and in sidewalk cracks, driveways, and tree wells. It is an invasive species in California and Oregon.

=== Other species ===
- Nassella charruana (Arechav.) Barkworth
- Nassella chilensis – Chilean tussockgrass
- Nassella crassiflora (Roseng. & B.R.Arrill.) Barkworth
- Nassella hyalina – spear grass
- Nassella ibarrensis
- Nassella laevissima
- Nassella leucotricha – Texas wintergrass
- Nassella manicata – Andean tussockgrass, tropical needlegrass
- Nassella neesiana – Chilean needle grass
- Nassella rosengurttii (Chase) Barkworth
- Nassella trichotoma – serrated tussockgrass, Yass River tussockgrass
- Nassella viridula – green needlegrass
