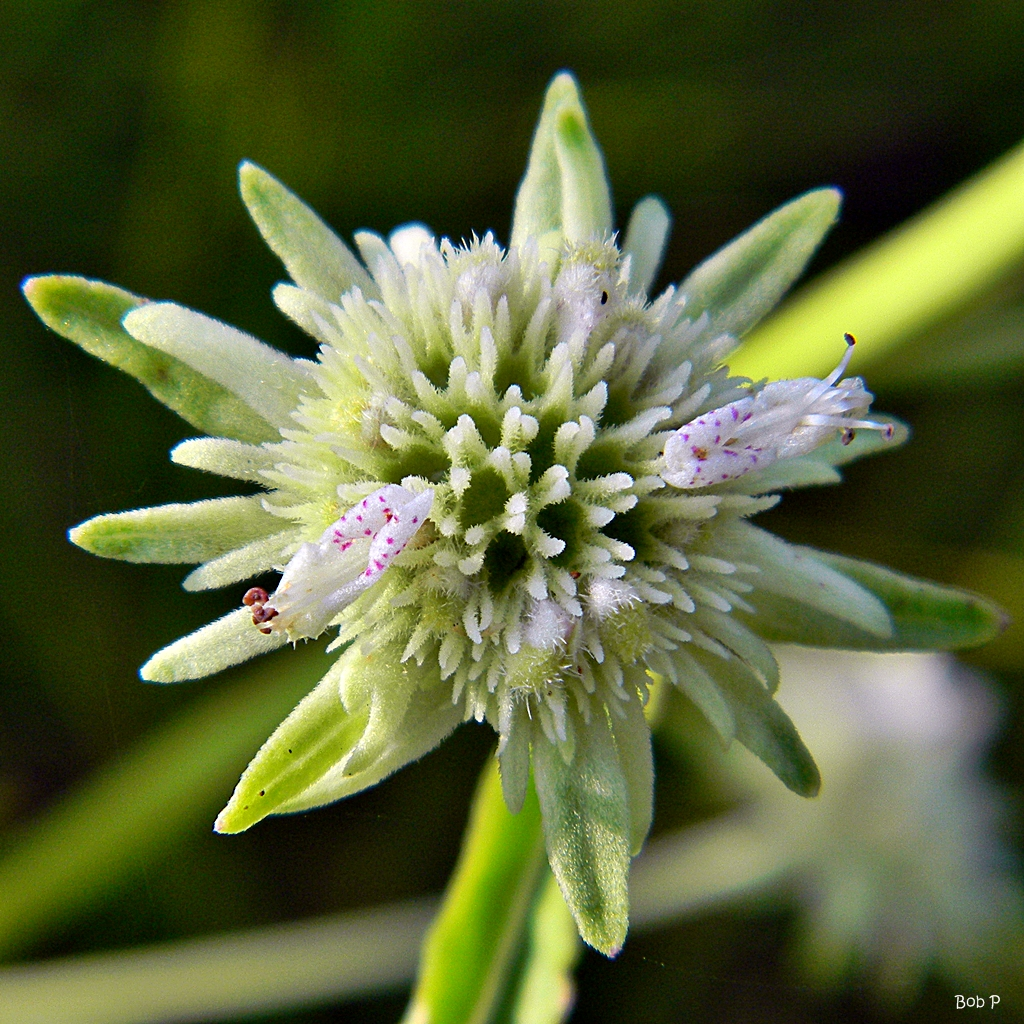
- Hyptis alata

Scientific classification
- Kingdom: Plantae
- Clade: Tracheophytes
- Clade: Angiosperms
- Clade: Eudicots
- Clade: Asterids
- Order: Lamiales
- Family: Lamiaceae
- Subfamily: Nepetoideae
- Tribe: Ocimeae
- Genus: Hyptis; Jacq.

Synonyms synonym_ref =
- Hypothronia Schrank; Peltodon Pohl

= Hyptis =

Genus of flowering plants

Hyptis is a genus of flowering plant in the family Lamiaceae. These plants, known commonly as bushmints, are native to the subtropical and tropical Americas, from the southern United States to northern Argentina. There are 170 species, which may be annual or perennial herb to shrub. In 2012 several genera were segregated from Hyptis, including Cantinoa, Mesosphaerum, and Oocephalus.

== Description ==
The genus has a wide diversity of growth forms with shrubs, subshrubs, perennial or annual herbs. They have compound inflorescences that can be lax or congested and commonly with Involucral bracts. . They grow in mostly tropical or subtropical savanna habitats.

== Etymology ==
The name Hyptis originates from the greek word Hyptios (ὕπτιος) meaning "supine" or "lying on ones back" in reference to the deflexed lower lip of the corolla.

== Taxonomic history ==
The genus was first described by Nicolaus jaquin in 1786 as Hyptis. In 1832 George Bentham studied the genus further and divided it into sections based morphologically on the different types of inflorescence. Since then there have been several rearrangements of species and sections within the genus. In 2004 the genus comprised 285 species and a total of 24 sections. A study in 2011 using nuclear and plastid DNA analysis showed that the genus was paraphyletic and that several of the sections could not be placed in a monophyletic clade. With this new information the genus underwent major changes in 2012 Harley and Pastore published their revision and the previous 24 sections were reduced to 10 sections and the total number of species in the genus changed to around 144. Several of the old sections were either moved to other genera or raised to become new genera. After all of these changes the genus was now monophyletic.

=== Current taxonomic State ===
A follow up study published by Pastore in 2021 further strengthened that the genus now was monophyletic, but it also highlighted the problem that several sections could not form monophyletic clades. The most recent newly described species was published in 2025 with the name Hyptis raymondii in honour of Raymond Harley and his great contributions to this genus and the entire lamiaceae family. The genus now has 170 accepted species.

- Hyptis
  - Myriocephala
  - - Hyptis
    - Apodotes
  - Eriosphaeria
  - - - Plagiotis
      - Axillares
    - Cyrta
    - - Latibracteateae
      - - Peltodon
        - Xylodontes I
      - - Xylodontes II
        - Marrubiastrae

The sections of Hyptis and their phylogenetic relationship.

== Species ==
170 species are accepted.

Section Adopotes

- Hyptis albolanata Antar, A.Soares & Harley *
- Hyptis australis Epling *
- Hyptis hassleri Briq. *
- Hyptis huberi Harley
- Hyptis loeseneriana Pilg. *
- Hyptis multibracteata Benth.
- Hyptis nudicaulis Benth.
- Hyptis sericea Benth. *
- Hyptis tetragona Pohl ex Benth.
- Hyptis tuberosa Harley *

Section Axillares

- Hyptis crassipes Epling *
- Hyptis hirsuta Kunth
- Hyptis homalophylla Pohl ex Benth. *
- Hyptis marrubioides Epling
- Hyptis uncinata Benth.

Section Cyrta

- Hyptis divaricata Pohl ex Benth. *
- Hyptis dumetorum Morong *
- Hyptis grisea Harley *
- Hyptis imitans Epling *
- Hyptis lagenaria A.St.-Hil. ex Benth. *
- Hyptis lavandulacea Pohl ex Benth.
- Hyptis microphylla Pohl ex Benth.
- Hyptis microsphaera Epling *
- Hyptis muelleri Briq.
- Hyptis pachyarthra Briq.
- Hyptis paludosa A.St.-Hil. ex Benth.
- Hyptis pulchella Briq.
- Hyptis recurvata Poit.

Section Eriosphaeria

- Hyptis adamantium A.St.-Hil. ex Benth. *
- Hyptis alpestris A.St.-Hil. ex Benth. *
- Hyptis angustifolia Pohl ex Benth. *
- Hyptis arenaria Benth. *
- Hyptis asteroides A.St.-Hil. ex Benth. *
- Hyptis cachimboensis Harley *
- Hyptis colligata Epling & Játiva
- Hyptis complicata A.St.-Hil. ex Benth. *
- Hyptis corymbosa Benth. *
- Hyptis crenata Pohl ex Benth. – Brazilian mint
- Hyptis cruciformis Epling
- Hyptis deminuta (Epling) Epling *
- Hyptis dictyodea Pohl ex Benth. *
- Hyptis dilatata Benth. *
- Hyptis ditassoides Mart. ex Benth.
- Hyptis gardneri Briq. *
- Hyptis goyazensis A.St.-Hil. ex Benth.
- Hyptis heterophylla Benth.
- Hyptis hilarii Benth.
- Hyptis imbricatiformis Harley
- Hyptis kempffiana Harley *
- Hyptis kramerioides Harley & J.F.B.Pastore
- Hyptis lanuginosa Glaz. ex Epling
- Hyptis lavoisierifolia A.Soares, J.F.B.Pastore & Harley *
- Hyptis leptoclada Benth. *
- Hyptis lucida Pohl ex Benth. *
- Hyptis melittiflora Harley & J.F.B.Pastore *
- Hyptis monticola Mart. ex Benth.
- Hyptis obtecta Benth. *
- Hyptis origanoides Pohl ex Benth. *
- Hyptis ovata Pohl ex Benth. *
- Hyptis pachyphylla Epling
- Hyptis passerina Mart. ex Benth.
- Hyptis pastorei Harley & Antar *
- Hyptis penaeoides Taub. ex Ule
- Hyptis piranii Harley *
- Hyptis proteoides A.St.-Hil. ex Benth.
- Hyptis pulegioides Pohl ex Benth.
- Hyptis pycnocephala Benth. *
- Hyptis raymondii Antar & A.Soares *
- Hyptis rhypidiophylla Briq. *
- Hyptis rotundifolia Benth.
- Hyptis saxatilis A.St.-Hil. ex Benth.
- Hyptis selloi Benth. *
- Hyptis spathulata Harley *
- Hyptis tricephala A.St.-Hil. ex Benth. *
- Hyptis turnerifolia Mart. ex Benth. *
- Hyptis velutina Pohl ex Benth. *
- Hyptis viminea Epling *
- Hyptis xanthiocephala Mart. ex Benth. *

Section Hyptis

- Hyptis actinocephala Griseb. *
- Hyptis ammotropha Griseb. *
- Hyptis armillata Epling *
- Hyptis capitata Jacq. – false ironwort, wild hops
- Hyptis conferta Pohl ex Benth.
- Hyptis florida Benth. *
- Hyptis havanensis Britton ex Epling *
- Hyptis hygrobia Briq.
- Hyptis imbricata Pohl ex Benth. *
- Hyptis lorentziana O.Hoffm. *
- Hyptis luticola Epling *
- Hyptis macrocephala M.Martens & Galeotti *
- Hyptis minutifolia Griseb. *
- Hyptis paupercula Epling *
- Hyptis petiolaris Pohl ex Benth. *
- Hyptis riparia Harley *
- Hyptis savannarum Briq. *
- Hyptis shaferi Britton *

Section Latibractea

- Hyptis bahiensis Harley
- Hyptis lantanifolia Poit. – island bushmint

Section Marrubiastrae

- Hyptis angulosa Schott ex Benth. *
- Hyptis balansae Briq.
- Hyptis brachypoda Epling *
- Hyptis brevipes Poit.
- Hyptis caespitosa A.St.-Hil. ex Benth.
- Hyptis guanchezii Harley *
- Hyptis inodora Schrank
- Hyptis intermedia Epling *
- Hyptis involucrata Benth. *
- Hyptis lacustris A.St.-Hil. ex Benth. *
- Hyptis lanceolata Poir. *
- Hyptis lappacea Benth. *
- Hyptis lappulacea Mart. ex Benth.
- Hyptis linarioides Pohl ex Benth.
- Hyptis longifolia Pohl ex Benth.
- Hyptis maya Harley *
- Hyptis mollis Pohl ex Benth. *
- Hyptis obtusiflora C.Presl ex Benth. *
- Hyptis pachycephala Epling *
- Hyptis parkeri Benth. *
- Hyptis personata Epling *
- Hyptis pseudosinuata Epling *
- Hyptis ramosa Pohl ex Benth.
- Hyptis sinuata Pohl ex Benth. *
- Hyptis subviolacea Briq. *
- Hyptis tweediei Benth. *
- Hyptis vilis Kunth & C.D.Bouché *

Section Myriocephala

- Hyptis odorata Benth.

Section Peltodon

- Hyptis campestris Harley & J.F.B.Pastore
- Hyptis comaroides (Briq.) Harley & J.F.B.Pastore *
- Hyptis meridionalis Harley & J.F.B.Pastore *
- Hyptis pusilla (Pohl) Harley & J.F.B.Pastore
- Hyptis radicans (Pohl) Harley & J.F.B.Pastore

Section Plagiotis

- Hyptis eriocauloides A.Rich. *
- Hyptis laciniata Benth. *
- Hyptis uliginosa A.St.-Hil. ex Benth.

Section Xylodontes I

- Hyptis alutacea Pohl ex Benth.
- Hyptis atrorubens Poit. – marubio oscuro
- Hyptis caduca Epling *
- Hyptis ferruginosa Pohl ex Benth.
- Hyptis hispida Benth. *
- Hyptis humilis Benth. *
- Hyptis lutescens Pohl ex Benth.
- Hyptis villosa Pohl ex Benth.

Section Xylodontes II

- Hyptis amaurocaulis Briq.
- Hyptis rubiginosa Benth.

Section Xylodontes old section

- Hyptis brachiata Briq. *
- Hyptis frondosa S.Moore *
- Hyptis nigrescens Pohl ex Benth. *
- Hyptis orbiculata Pohl ex Benth. *
- Hyptis remota Pohl ex Benth. *
- Hyptis rondonii Epling *
- Hyptis salicina J.A.Schmidt *
- Hyptis woodii Harley *

Section unknown

- Hyptis alata (Raf.) Shinners – clustered bushmint, musky mint
- Hyptis argentea Epling & Mathias
- Hyptis bicolor Epling
- Hyptis colubrimontis Epling & Játiva
- Hyptis cualensis J.G.González & Art.Castro
- Hyptis cymulosa Benth.
- Hyptis fallax Harley
- Hyptis hamatidens Epling & Játiva
- Hyptis langlassei Fernald
- Hyptis laurifolia A.St.-Hil. ex Benth.
- Hyptis lobata A.St.-Hil. ex Benth.
- Hyptis ovalifolia Benth.
- Hyptis pseudolantana Epling
- Hyptis pyriformis Epling & Játiva
- Hyptis rhytidea Benth.
- Hyptis salvioides (Zahlbr.) ined.
- Hyptis tetracephala Bordignon
- Hyptis tumidicalyx Epling & Játiva
- placed in section based on morphology

== Gallery ==
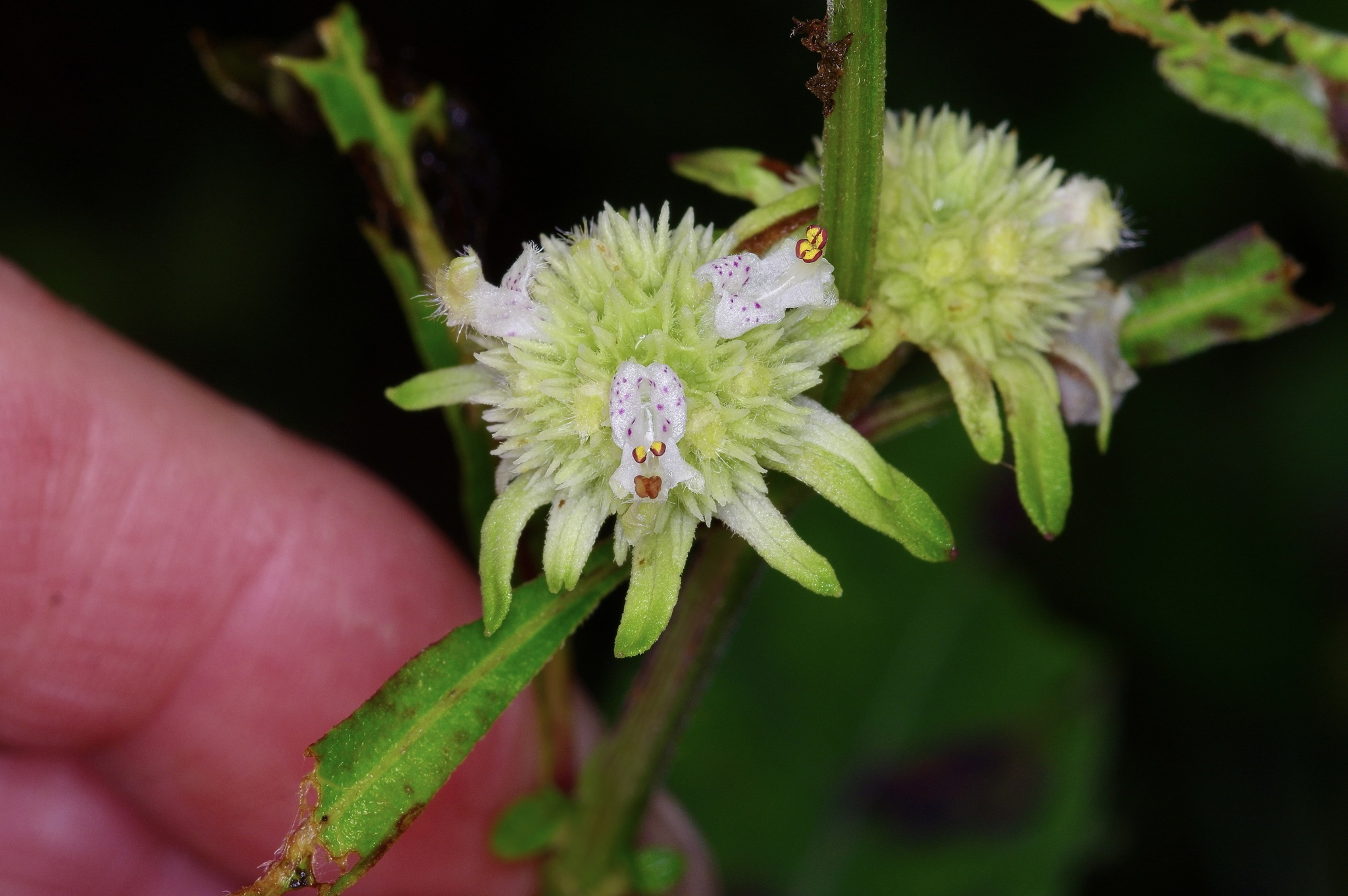
Hyptis alata

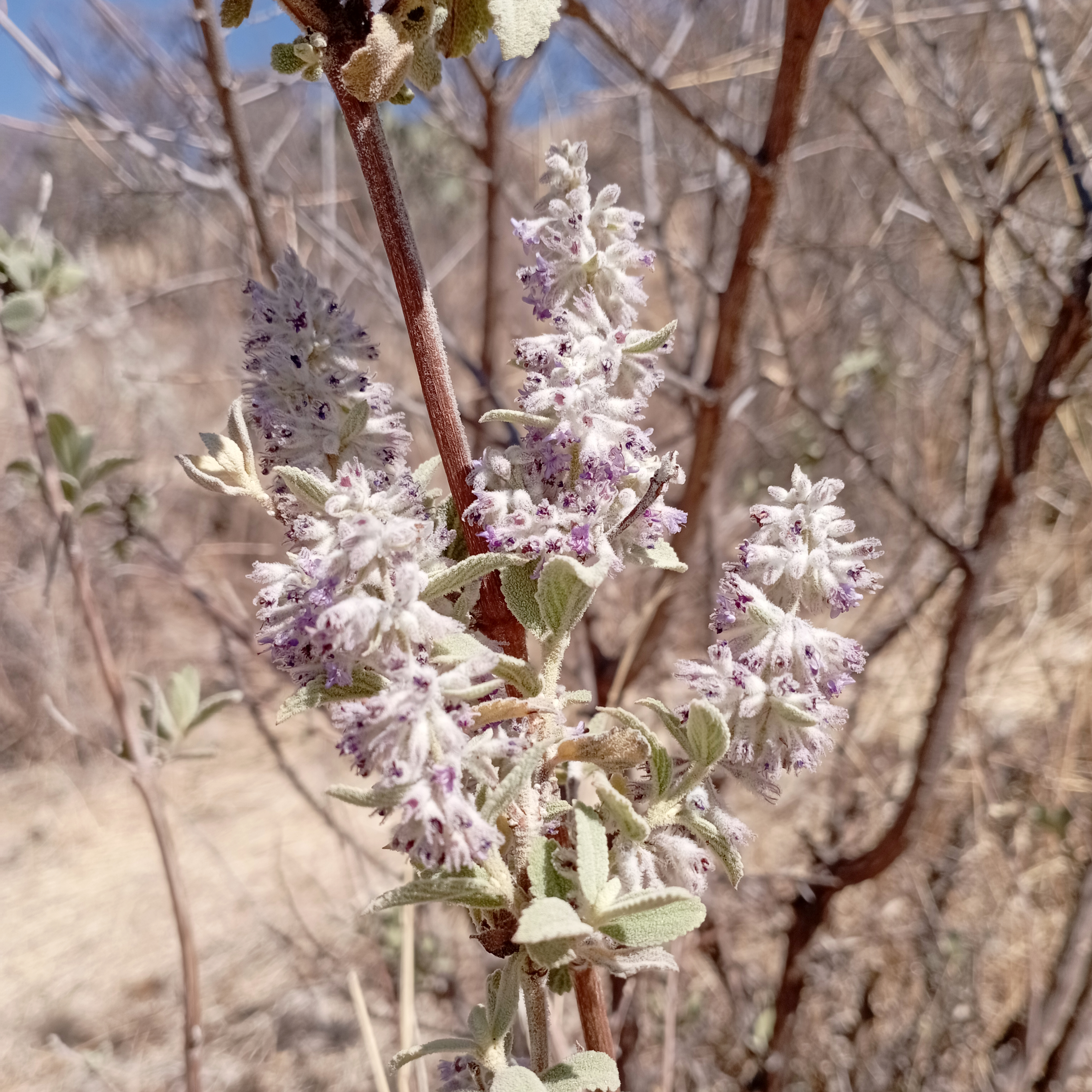
Hyptis albida

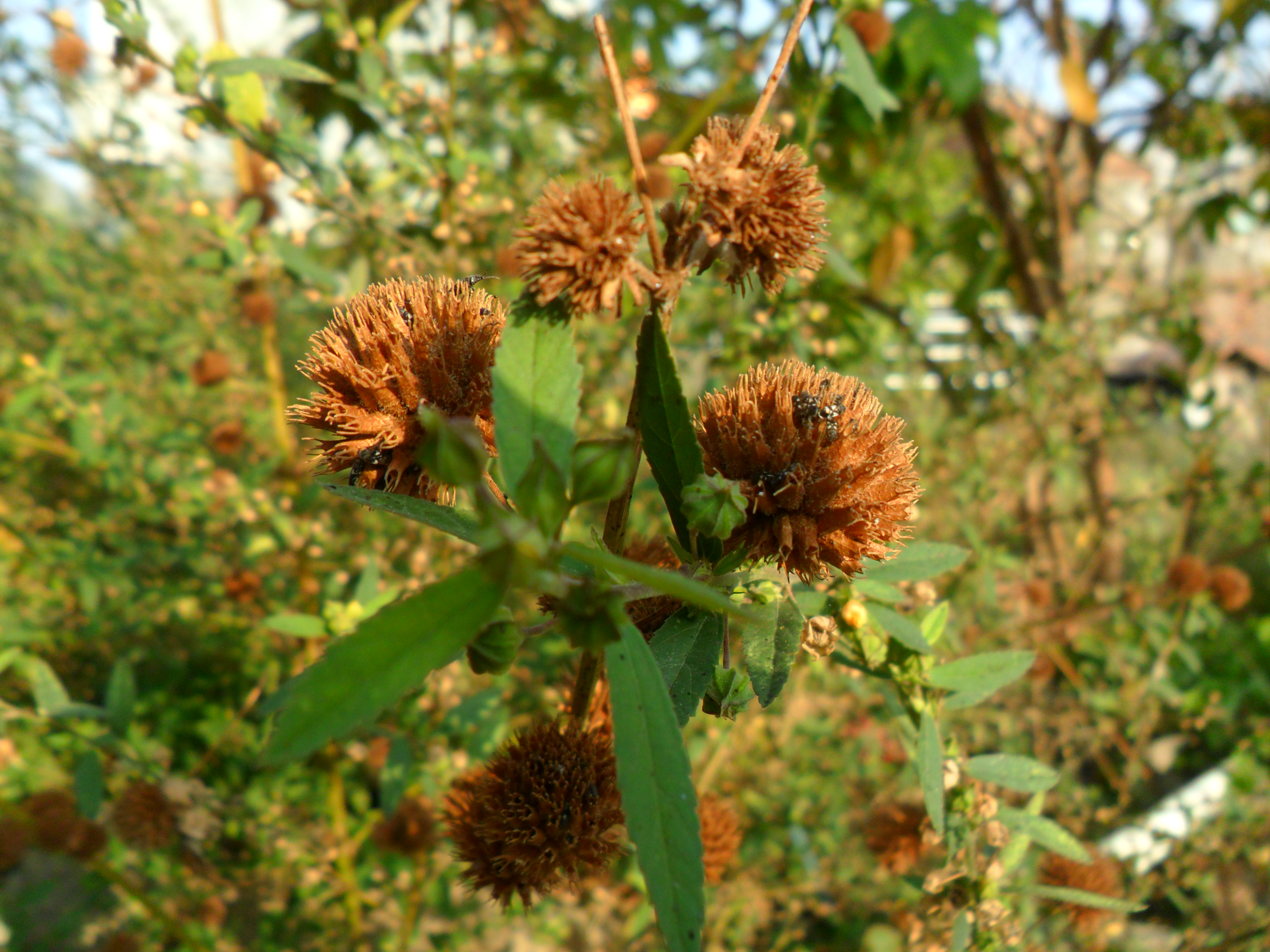
Hyptis brevipes

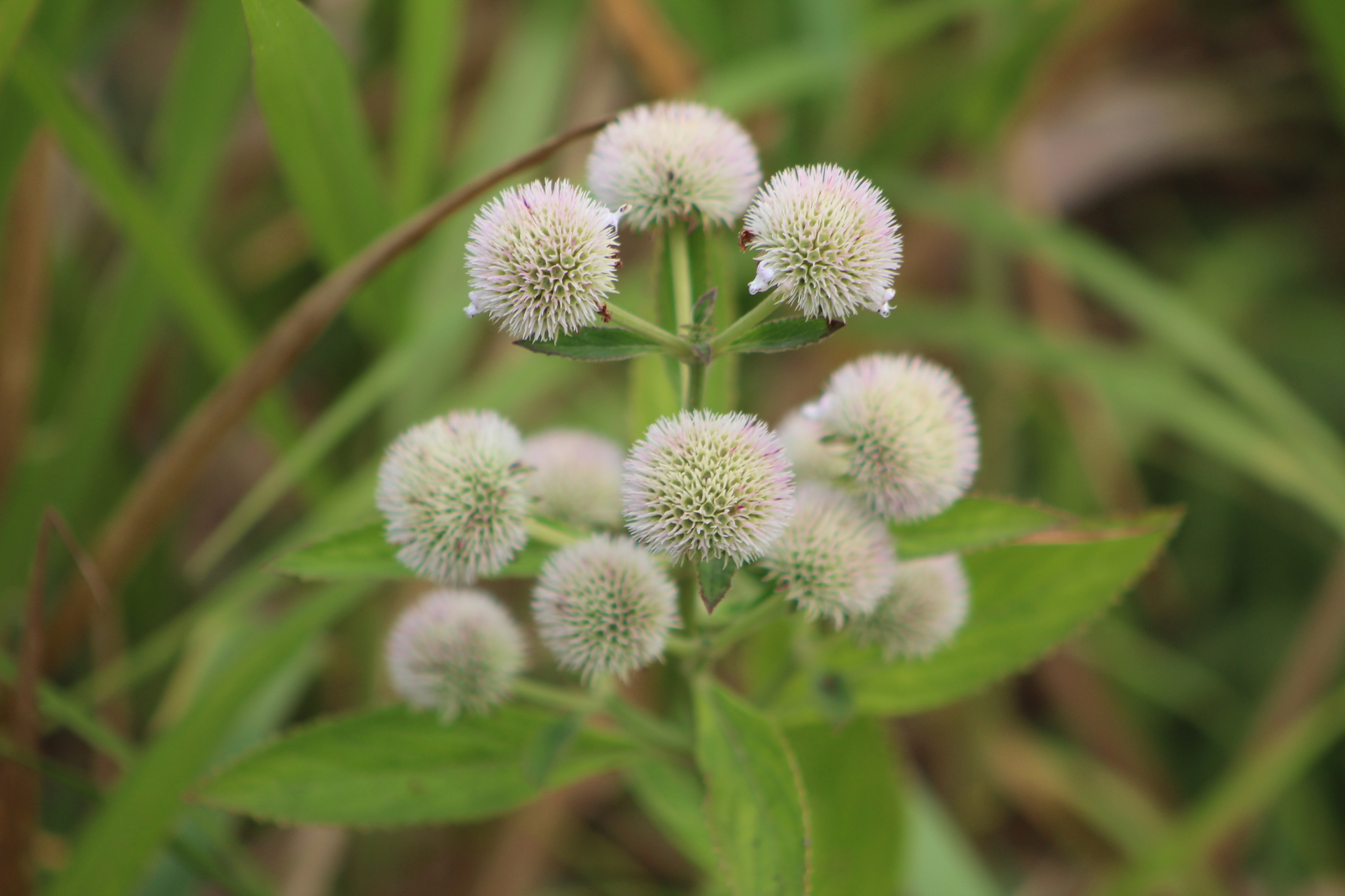
Hyptis capitata

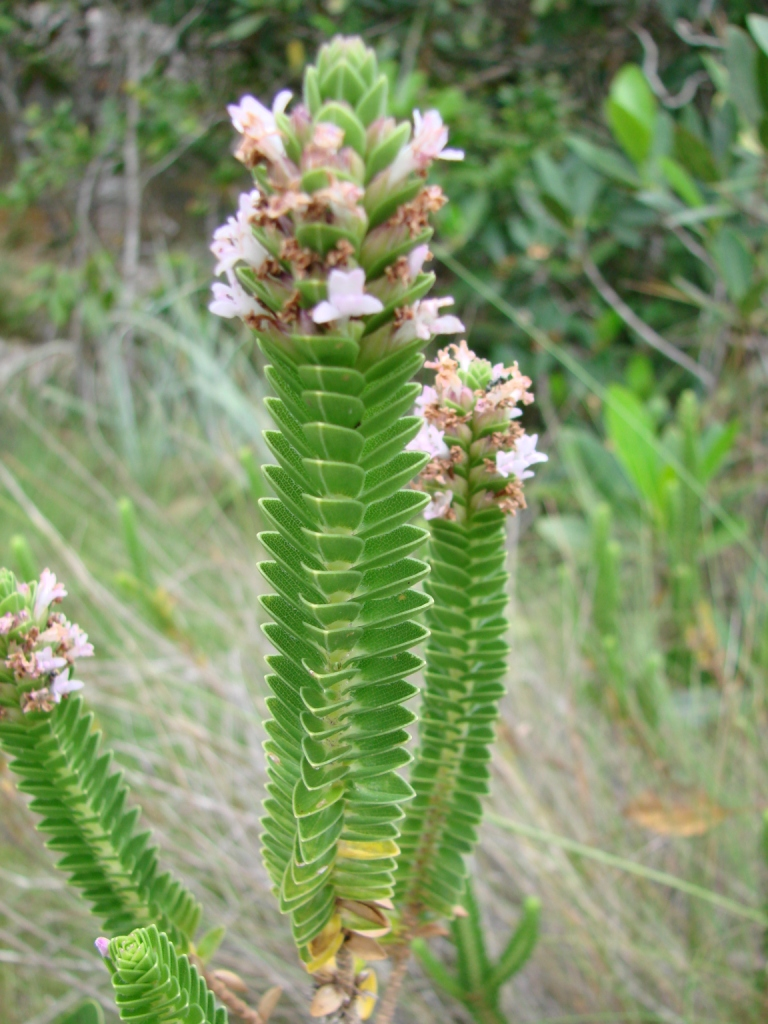
Hyptis cruciformis

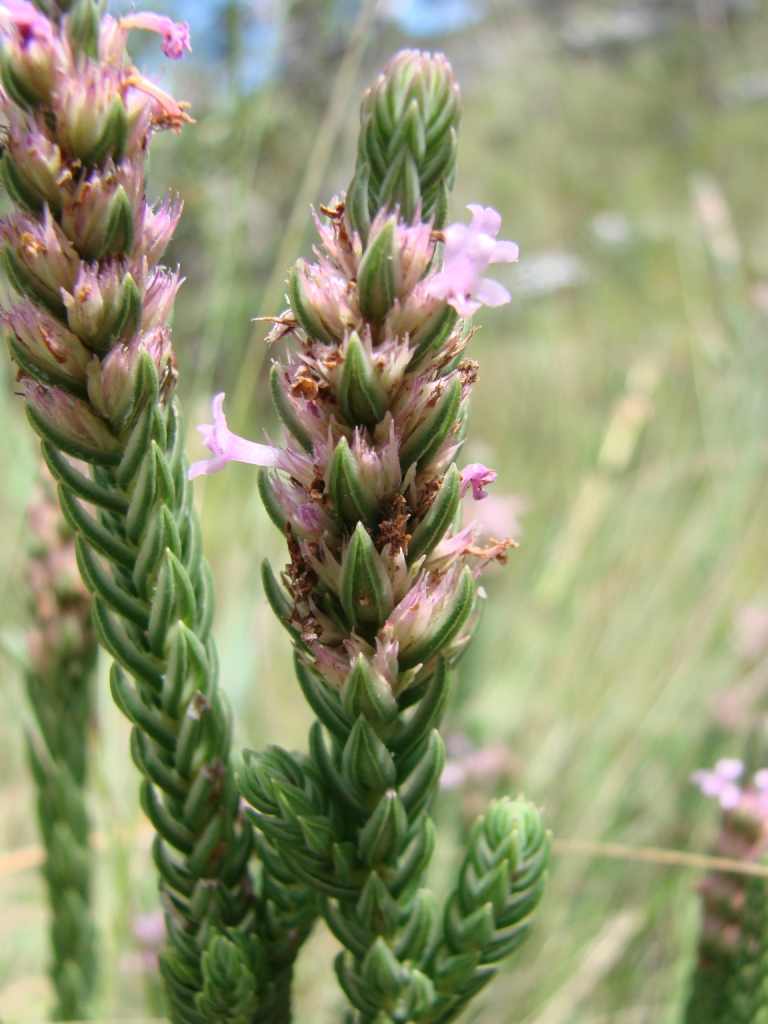
Hyptis imbricatiformis

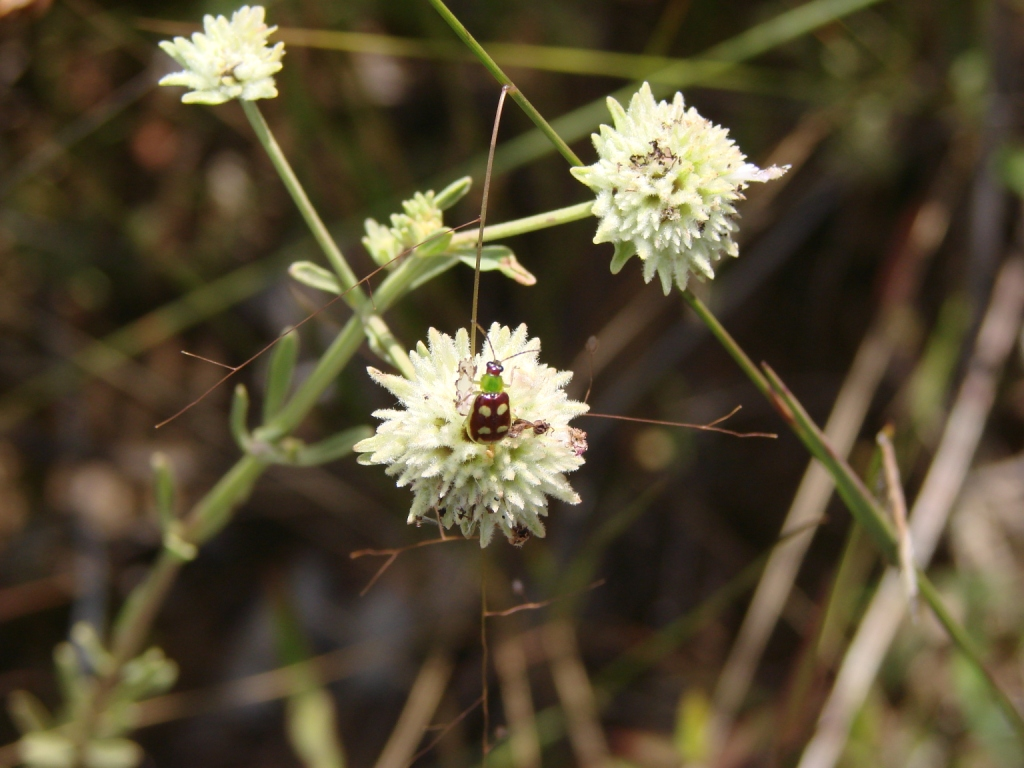
Hyptis linarioides
