= Brazilian mint =

Brazilian mint can refer to:

- Casa da Moeda do Brasil, which mints the coins of Brazil
- Hyptis crenata, a bushmint shrub
