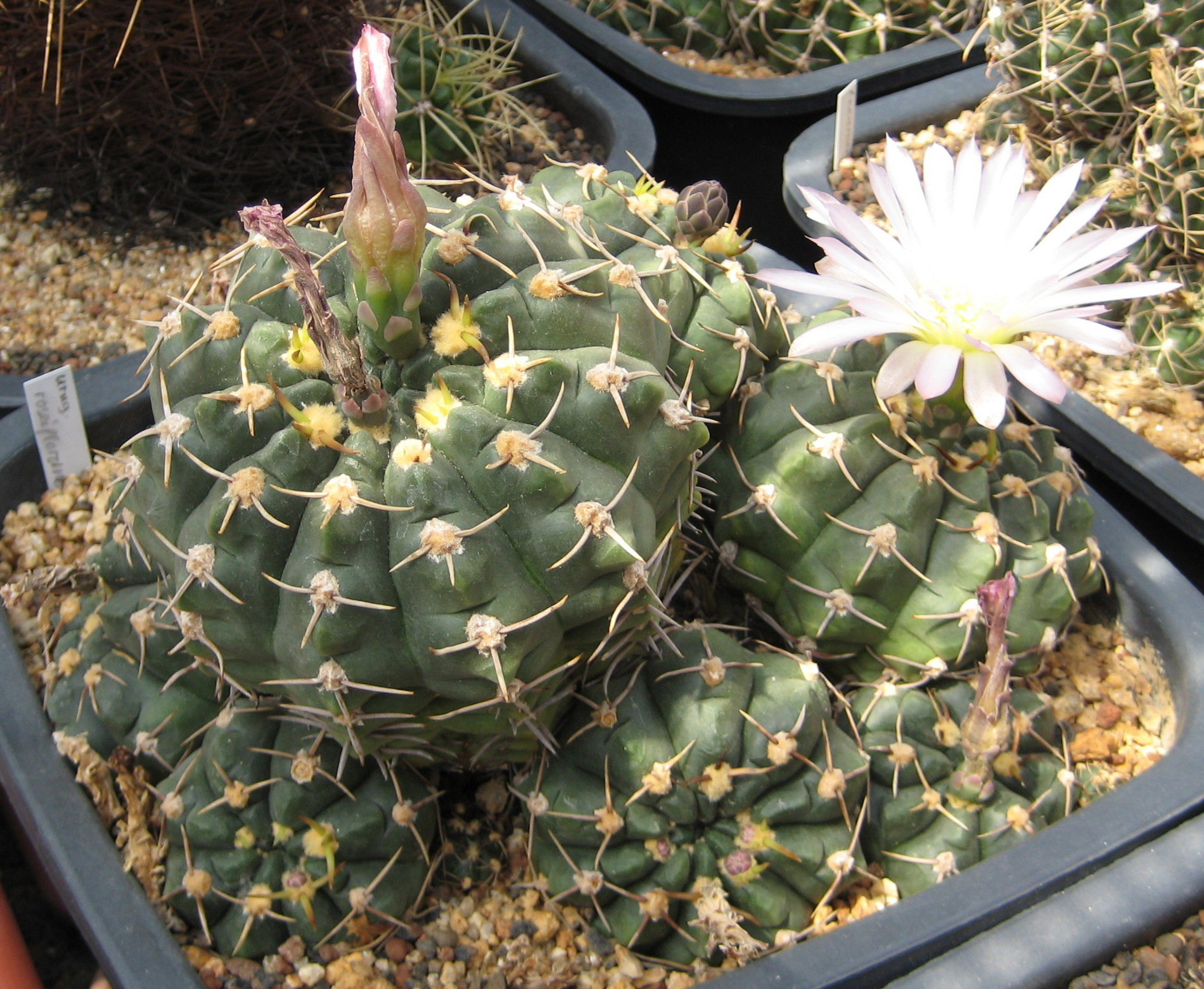

Conservation status
- Vulnerable (IUCN 3.1)

Scientific classification
- Kingdom: Plantae
- Clade: Tracheophytes
- Clade: Angiosperms
- Clade: Eudicots
- Order: Caryophyllales
- Family: Cactaceae
- Subfamily: Cactoideae
- Genus: Gymnocalycium
- Species: G. uruguayense

Binomial name
- Gymnocalycium uruguayense (Arechav.) Britton & Rose 1922

Synonyms
- Echinocactus uruguayensis Arechav. 1905; Gymnocalycium hyptiacanthum subsp. uruguayense (Arechav.) Mereg. 2008; Echinocactus guerkeanus F.Haage 1911; Echinocactus melanocarpus Arechav. 1905; Echinocactus netrelianus Monv. ex Labour. 1853; Echinocactus platensis var. guerkeanus (F.Haage) Speg. 1905; Echinocactus uruguayensis f. depressus Osten 1941; Gymnocalycium artigas Herter 1951; Gymnocalycium artigas var. roseiflorum (Y.Itô) Milt 2015; Gymnocalycium guerkeanum (F.Haage) Britton & Rose 1922; Gymnocalycium hyptiacanthum subsp. netrelianum (Monv. ex Labour.) Mereg. 2008; Gymnocalycium leeanum var. netrelianum (Monv. ex Labour.) Backeb. 1936; Gymnocalycium leeanum var. roseiflorum Y.Itô 1957; Gymnocalycium melanocarpum (Arechav.) Britton & Rose 1922; Gymnocalycium netrelianum (Monv. ex Labour.) Britton & Rose 1922; Gymnocalycium rauschii H.Till & W.Till 1990; Gymnocalycium uruguayense var. roseiflorum Y.Itô 1957

= Gymnocalycium uruguayense =

Species of cactus

Gymnocalycium uruguayense is a species of Gymnocalycium from Brazil and Uruguay.

== Description ==
Gymnocalycium uruguayense forms groups with juicy, green to blue-green bulbous body which is low to the ground, flattened, spherical shoots that are either flush with the ground or protrude 3 to 4 centimeters. These shoots have diameters of 5 to 10 centimeters (rarely up to 14 centimeters). The plant features 6 to 10 (rarely up to 14) ribs divided into hexagonal humps with noticeable chin-like projections. It lacks central spines but has 3 to 7 finely fluffy, straight to slightly curved, yellowish-brown to whitish marginal spines, 1 to 3 centimeters long.

The bell-shaped flowers are whitish to lemon yellow or pink, sometimes greenish-yellow, and reach up to 4 centimeters in length and 5.5 to 6.5 centimeters in diameter. The flowers are occasionally unisexual, and the plants are dioecious. The elongated to egg-shaped fruits are dark green to blue-green, up to 2 centimeters long, and 1 centimeter in diameter.

== Distribution ==
Gymnocalycium uruguayense is found in Brazil (Rio Grande do Sul) and Uruguay.

== Taxonomy ==
First described as Echinocactus uruguayensis by José Arechavaleta in 1905, the species name refers to its distribution in Uruguay. In 1922, Nathaniel Lord Britton and Joseph Nelson Rose reclassified it under the genus Gymnocalycium.
