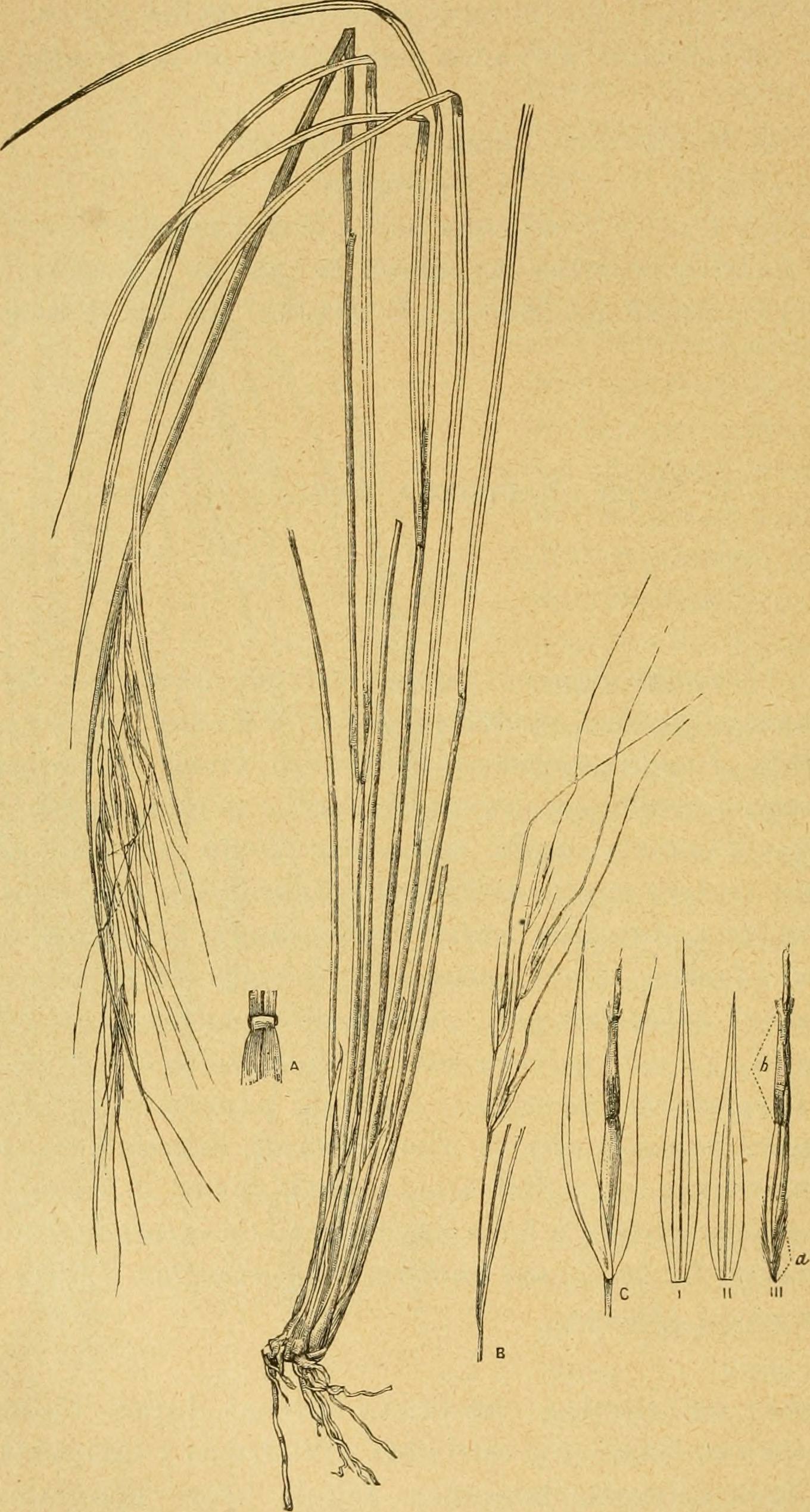
- Botanical illustration

Scientific classification
- Kingdom: Plantae
- Clade: Embryophytes
- Clade: Tracheophytes
- Clade: Angiosperms
- Clade: Monocots
- Clade: Commelinids
- Order: Poales
- Family: Poaceae
- Subfamily: Pooideae
- Genus: Nassella
- Species: N. charruana

Binomial name
- Nassella charruana (Arechav.) M.E.Barkworth

Synonyms
- Stipa charruana Arechav.; Stipa longicylindrica Kuntze

= Nassella charruana =

Species of flowering plant

Nassella charruana, the lobed needle grass, is a species of bunchgrass in the family Poaceae, native to southern Brazil, Uruguay, and northeastern Argentina, and introduced to Victoria, Australia. As its synonym Stipa charruana it has gained the Royal Horticultural Society's Award of Garden Merit as an ornamental.
