= Lobatae =

Lobatae may refer to:

- The Latin plural term for "lobed" (singular lobata), occurring in a scientific description
- The Latin possessive form of lobata, as in:
  - Flos Puerariae Lobatae, medicinal preparations from the flowers of Pueraria lobata, Kudzu
  - Radix Puerariae Lobatae, medicinal preparations from the root of Pueraria lobata, Kudzu

== Plants ==
- Section Lobatae of genus Quercus, the red oaks, also known as Erythrobalanus
- Sections or Series of other plant genera, including:
  - Calceolaria, a genus of plants in the family Calceolariaceae
  - Hyptis, widespread in the tropics and warmer temperate regions of the Americas
  - Passiflora, a genus of about 500 species of flowering plants
  - Saxifraga, a genus containing about 440 known species of Holarctic perennial plants
