= Nassella ibarrensis =

Conservation status
- Least Concern (IUCN 3.1)

Scientific classification
- Kingdom: Plantae
- Clade: Tracheophytes
- Clade: Angiosperms
- Clade: Monocots
- Clade: Commelinids
- Order: Poales
- Family: Poaceae
- Subfamily: Pooideae
- Genus: Nassella
- Species: N. ibarrensis

Binomial name
- Nassella ibarrensis (Kunth) Lægaard

Species of grass

Nassella ibarrensis is a species of grass in the family Poaceae. It is endemic to Andean Ecuador.
