= Mesosphaerum diversifolium =

Conservation status
- Critically Endangered (IUCN 3.1)

Scientific classification
- Kingdom: Plantae
- Clade: Tracheophytes
- Clade: Angiosperms
- Clade: Eudicots
- Clade: Asterids
- Order: Lamiales
- Family: Lamiaceae
- Genus: Mesosphaerum
- Species: M. diversifolium

Binomial name
- Mesosphaerum diversifolium (Benth.) Kuntze

Species of flowering plant

Mesosphaerum diversifolium is a species of flowering plant in the family Lamiaceae, formerly known as Hyptis diversifolia. Its natural habitat is subtropical or tropical moist montane forests only in Ecuador.
