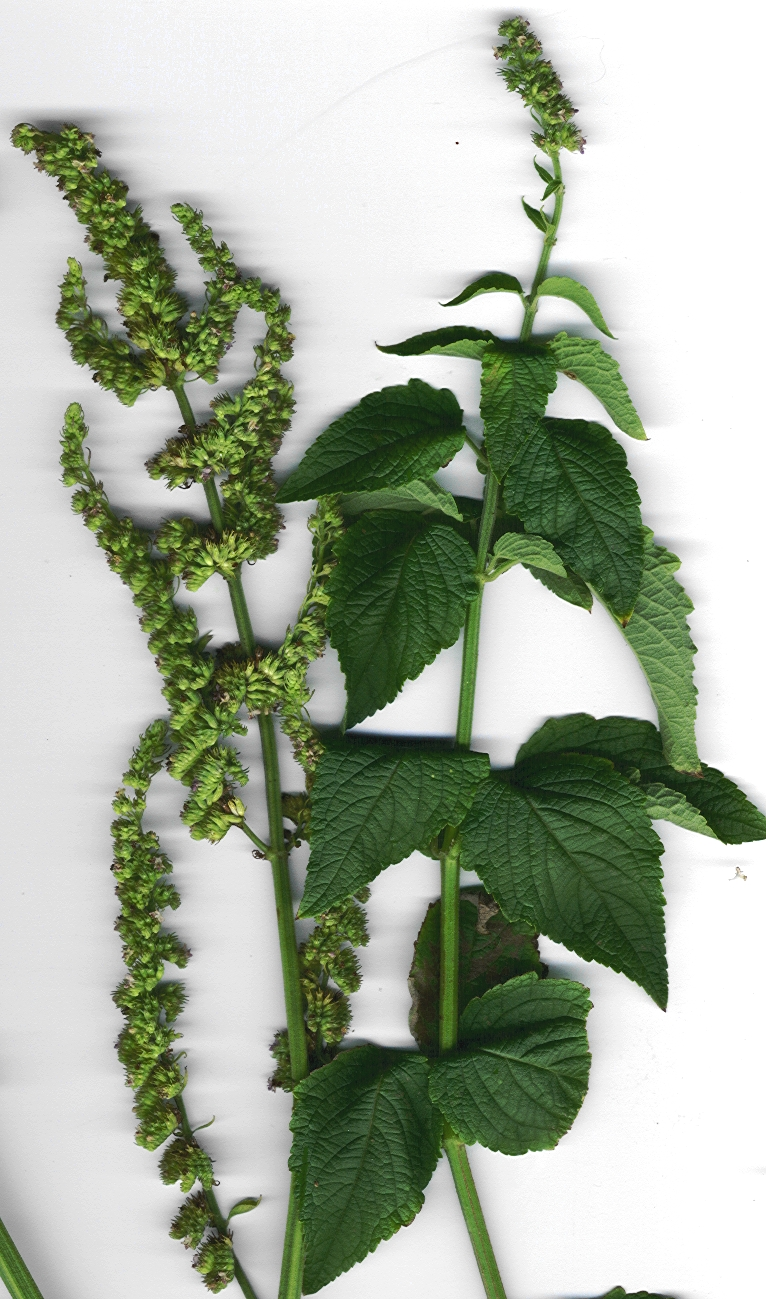

Scientific classification
- Kingdom: Plantae
- Clade: Tracheophytes
- Clade: Angiosperms
- Clade: Eudicots
- Clade: Asterids
- Order: Lamiales
- Family: Lamiaceae
- Genus: Mesosphaerum
- Species: M. pectinatum

Binomial name
- Mesosphaerum pectinatum (L.) Kuntze

Synonyms
- Bystropogon pectinatus (L.) L'Hér.; Hyptis pectinata (L.) Poit.; Nepeta pectinata L.; Ballota disticha Rodschied; Ballota parviflora Sessé & Moc.; Ballota suaveolens Rodschied; Brotera persica Spreng.; Bystropogon coarctatus Thonn. & Schumach.; Clinopodium imbricatum Vell.; Hyptis nepetoides Fisch. ex Schrank; Hyptis persica (Spreng.) Poit.; Hyptis racemosa Zuccagni; Nepeta aristata Rich.; Nepeta persica Poit. ex Benth.

= Mesosphaerum pectinatum =

Species of flowering plant

Mesosphaerum pectinatum is a species of flowering plant in the family Lamiaceae commonly called comb bushmint. It is native to the tropical Americas, as well as being naturalized in parts of Africa, Asia, and Australia.

== Description ==
This species is an annual or short-lived perennial herb growing 0.6–2.3 m (2 ft 0 in – 7 ft 7 in) tall, with the lower stems becoming softly woody with age.

The leaves are carried on stalks 15–40 mm (0.59–1.57 in) long. The blades are ovate to narrowly ovate, 15–45 mm (0.59–1.77 in) long and 10–30 mm (0.39–1.18 in) wide. They are sparsely hairy on the upper surface and paler beneath, where they are usually softly white-felted. The leaf tips are blunt, the bases truncate, and the margins finely and irregularly scalloped to toothed.

The inflorescence is terminal and often branched. Flowers are usually arranged in dense, horizontal, comb-like clusters, sometimes paired on a shared stalk, though looser arrangements also occur. The lower bracts resemble small leaves and become progressively smaller towards the tip; the bracteoles are narrow, bristle-like, and about 3 mm (0.12 in) long.

The calyx is about 2.5 mm (0.098 in) long at flowering and enlarges to 5 mm (0.20 in) in fruit, with dense hairs inside the throat. The corolla is whitish to pale mauve and approximately 3.5 mm (0.14 in) long.

== Distribution and habitat ==
Mesosphaerum pectinatum′s native range extends from Mexico, Florida, and the West Indies in the north through Central America to Bolivia and Brazil in the south.

It is also naturalized in the Andaman Islands, Angola, north-east Argentina, Assam in India, Benin, Botswana, Burundi, Cape Verde, the Central African Republic, the Comoros, the Republic of the Congo, the Democratic Republic of the Congo, Equatorial Guinea, Eritrea, Ethiopia, Fiji, Gabon, Guinea, Hawaii, the Ivory Coast, Java, Kenya, Malawi, the Marianas, Mozambique, New Caledonia, New Guinea, the Philippines, Queensland in Australia, Rwanda, Samoa, South Africa, South Sudan, Taiwan, Tanzania, Togo, Uganda, Vanuatu, Zambia, and Zimbabwe. In Africa, it is long established and is often considered native.

It grows in hotter, wetter environments, often on disturbed ground, where it can become especially weedy.

== See also ==
- List of Lamiaceae of South Africa
