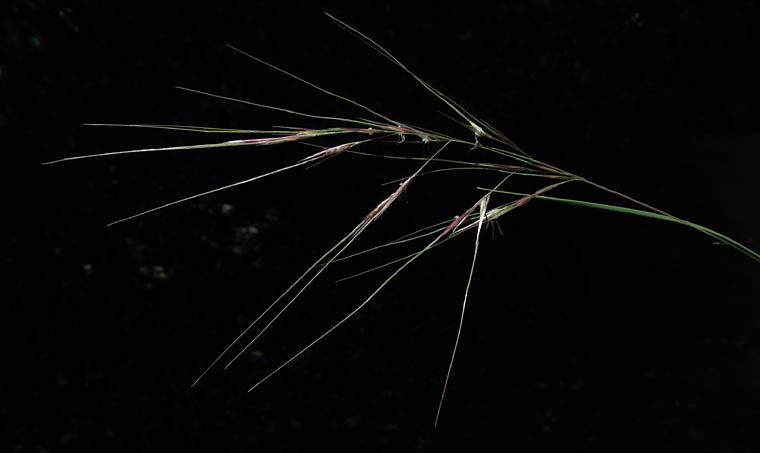

Conservation status
- Vulnerable (NatureServe)

Scientific classification
- Kingdom: Plantae
- Clade: Tracheophytes
- Clade: Angiosperms
- Clade: Monocots
- Clade: Commelinids
- Order: Poales
- Family: Poaceae
- Subfamily: Pooideae
- Genus: Nassella
- Species: N. cernua

Binomial name
- Nassella cernua (Stebbins & R.M. Love) Barkworth

Synonyms
- Stipa cernua (former)

= Nassella cernua =

Species of flowering plant

Nassella cernua (syn. Stipa cernua) is a species of grass known by the common name nodding needlegrass.

The bunchgrass is native to western California in the United States and Baja California in Mexico.

== Distribution ==
Nassella cernua is a component of California and Baja California in native grasslands, chaparral, and juniper woodlands. This bunchgrass is found in the California Coast Ranges and Transverse Ranges (U.S.), and Peninsular Ranges (U.S. & Mexico).

This and many other native grasses of the California Floristic Province have declined because of the encroachment of introduced species of grasses, making native grasslands a very endangered habitat type, and this plant a listed Vulnerable species.

== Description ==
The perennial Nassella cernua bunchgrass has stems up to 2–3 feet (0.61–0.91 m) tall. The narrow leaves have a waxy texture.

The panicle is open with bending or nodding branches. The awn is up to 4 inches (10 cm) long.

== Cultivation ==
Nassella cernua is cultivated as a drought-tolerant ornamental grass by specialty plant nurseries, for use in native plant and wildlife gardens, drought tolerant landscaping, and for habitat restoration projects.

== See also ==
- Native grasses of California
