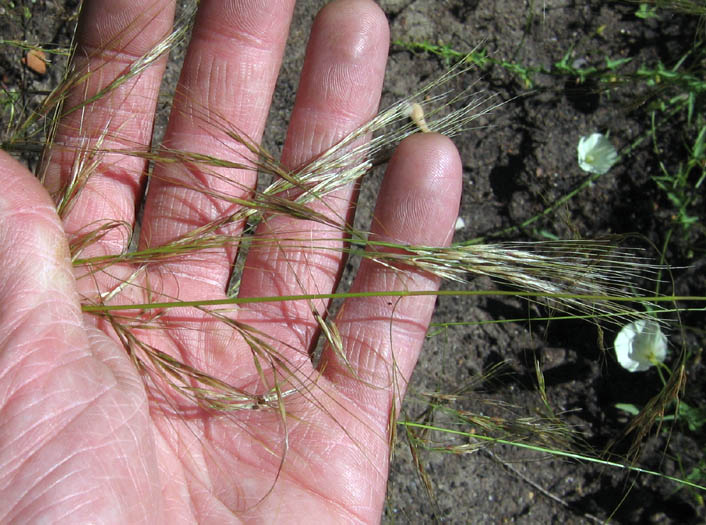

Conservation status
- Secure (NatureServe)

Scientific classification
- Kingdom: Plantae
- Clade: Tracheophytes
- Clade: Angiosperms
- Clade: Monocots
- Clade: Commelinids
- Order: Poales
- Family: Poaceae
- Subfamily: Pooideae
- Genus: Nassella
- Species: N. lepida

Binomial name
- Nassella lepida (Hitchc.) Barkworth

Synonyms
- Stipa lepida

= Nassella lepida =

Species of flowering plant

Nassella lepida (syn. Stipa lepida) is a species of grass known by the common names foothill needlegrass, foothills nassella, foothill stipa, small-flowered stipa, small-flowered needlegrass, and smallflower tussockgrass.

== Distribution ==
It is native to California in the United States, where it occurs as far north as Humboldt County, and its range extends into Baja California.

== Description ==
This is a perennial bunchgrass growing up to a meter tall. The flat or rolled leaf blades are up to 23 centimeters (9.1 in) long. The panicle is up to 55 centimeters (22 in) long and has branches bearing up to 6 spikelets each The spikelet has an awn up to 4.6 cm (1.8 in) to 5.5 cm (2.2 in) long.

This grass grows in chaparral and grassland habitat. It can also be found in coastal sage scrub and coastal prairie.

This species and several others were recently transferred from genus Stipa into Nassella, mainly on the basis of their "strongly convolute lemmas". Genetic evidence supports the transfer.

This species may hybridize with Nassella pulchra.
