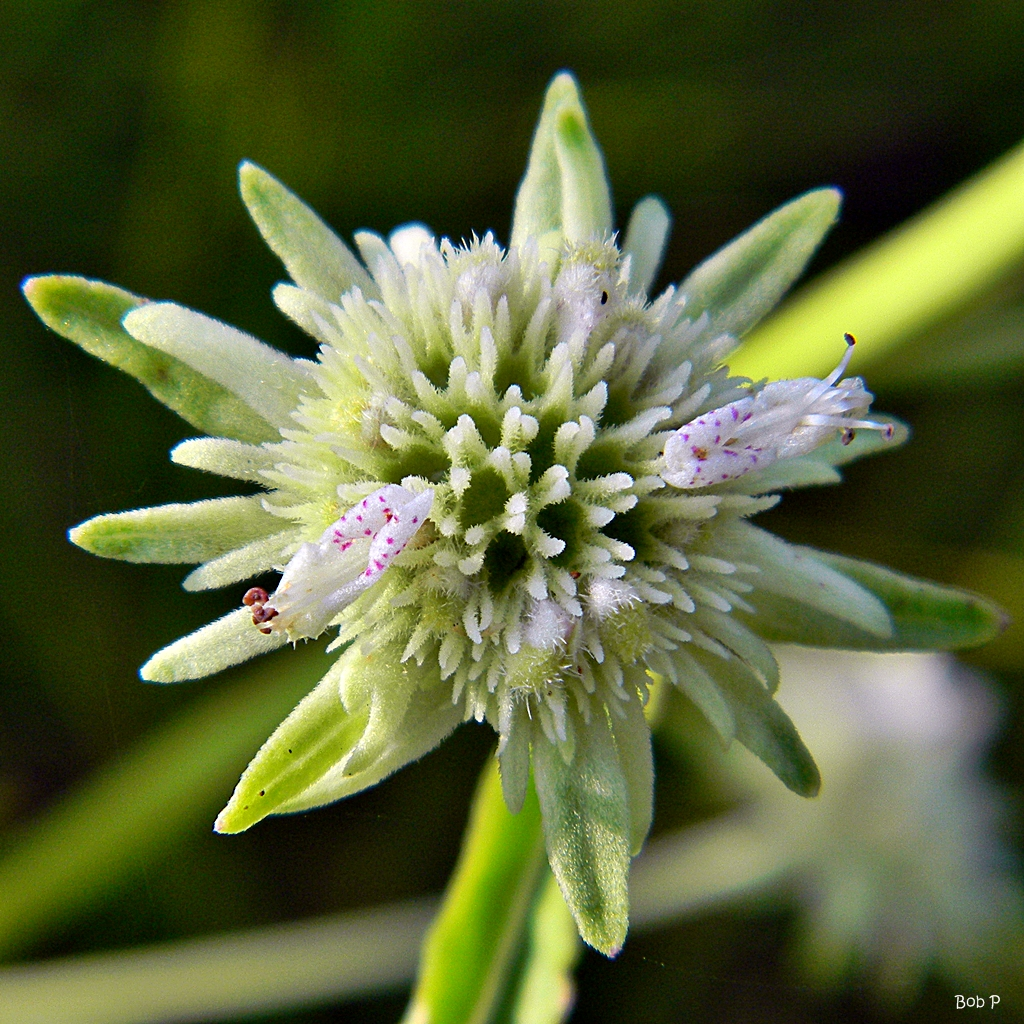

Conservation status
- Secure (NatureServe)

Scientific classification
- Kingdom: Plantae
- Clade: Embryophytes
- Clade: Tracheophytes
- Clade: Angiosperms
- Clade: Eudicots
- Clade: Asterids
- Order: Lamiales
- Family: Lamiaceae
- Genus: Hyptis
- Species: H. alata

Binomial name
- Hyptis alata (Raf.) Shinners

Synonyms
- Pycnanthemum alatum Raf.; Clinopodium rugosum L.; Hyptis radiata Willd., illegitimate superfluous name; Mesosphaerum radiatum Kuntze; Hyptis floridana Gand.; Hyptis leiocephala Gand.; Hyptis tracyi Gand.; Hyptis latidens Urb.; Hyptis rugosula Briq.

= Hyptis alata =

Musky mint

Species of wetlands plant

Hyptis alata, the musky mint or clustered bushmint, is a shrub species of flowering plant in the Lamiaceae, the mint family. The genus Hyptis is commonly known as the bushmints. Hyptis alata is the southeastern United States analog to the Southwestern deserts H. emoryi, the desert lavender.USDA: NRCS: Plants Profile Hyptis alata

Varieties

1. Hyptis alata subsp. alata - United States and Cuba
2. Hyptis alata subsp. rugosula (Briq.) Harley - South America

== Description ==
H. alata can reach up to 4 feet in height and possesses round flower heads. Its leaves are simple and lanceolate in shape. They have serrated leaf margins. Individuals give off a musky mint scent, the origin of its common name.

== Distribution and habitat ==
This species' native range extends throughout the southeastern United States from Texas to North Carolina, as well as in Cuba, Argentina, southern Brazil, and Paraguay.

It is found in wetlands, prairies, pond margins and wet flatwoods.
