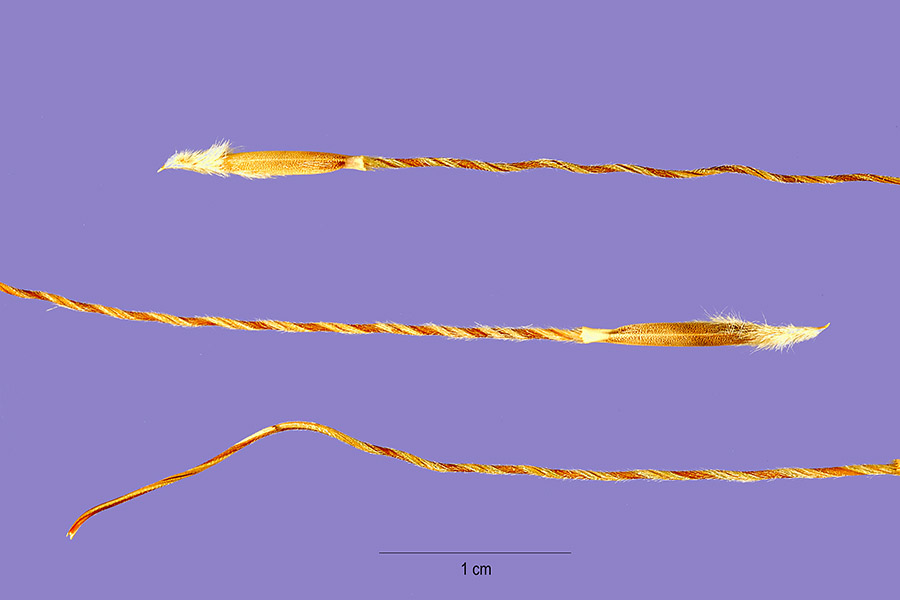
- Fruits showing the long awns

Conservation status
- Secure (NatureServe)

Scientific classification
- Kingdom: Plantae
- Clade: Tracheophytes
- Clade: Angiosperms
- Clade: Monocots
- Clade: Commelinids
- Order: Poales
- Family: Poaceae
- Subfamily: Pooideae
- Genus: Nassella
- Species: N. leucotricha

Binomial name
- Nassella leucotricha (Trin. & Rupr.) R.W.Pohl

Synonyms
- Stipa ciliata Scheele; Stipa leucotricha Trin. & Rupr.

= Nassella leucotricha =

Species of flowering plant

Nassella leucotricha is a species of grass known by the common names Texas wintergrass, Texas needlegrass, and Texas tussockgrass. It is native to the south-central United States (Texas, Oklahoma, Arkansas, Louisiana, Mississippi) and much of Mexico (from Tamaulipas and Baja California south to Chiapas).

== Description ==
Nassella leucotricha is a perennial bunchgrass with stems up to 1.2 metres (3.9 ft) tall. There are two types of flowers, opening flowers and cleistogamous (non-opening) flowers that self-pollinate and are sometimes tucked away in the leaf sheaths.

The fruit has a sharp tip and a twisted awn up to 9 centimeters (3.6 inches) long. This fruit can damage the mouths of livestock and can get caught in wool and eyes.

The grass provides a good forage for animals when it is green, but the animals should be removed from the area as the seeds develop on the plants and replaced when the seeds fall to the ground.

This grass is known as a weed outside its native region. In Australia it is an invasive species that is injurious to livestock.
