= Mesosphaerum argutifolium =

Conservation status
- Critically Endangered (IUCN 3.1)

Scientific classification
- Kingdom: Plantae
- Clade: Tracheophytes
- Clade: Angiosperms
- Clade: Eudicots
- Clade: Asterids
- Order: Lamiales
- Family: Lamiaceae
- Genus: Mesosphaerum
- Species: M. argutifolium

Binomial name
- Mesosphaerum argutifolium (Epling) Harley & J.F.B.Pastore

Species of flowering plant

Mesosphaerum argutifolium is a species of flowering plant in the family Lamiaceae, formerly known as Hyptis argutifolia. It is found only in Ecuador. Its natural habitat is subtropical or tropical moist montane forests.
