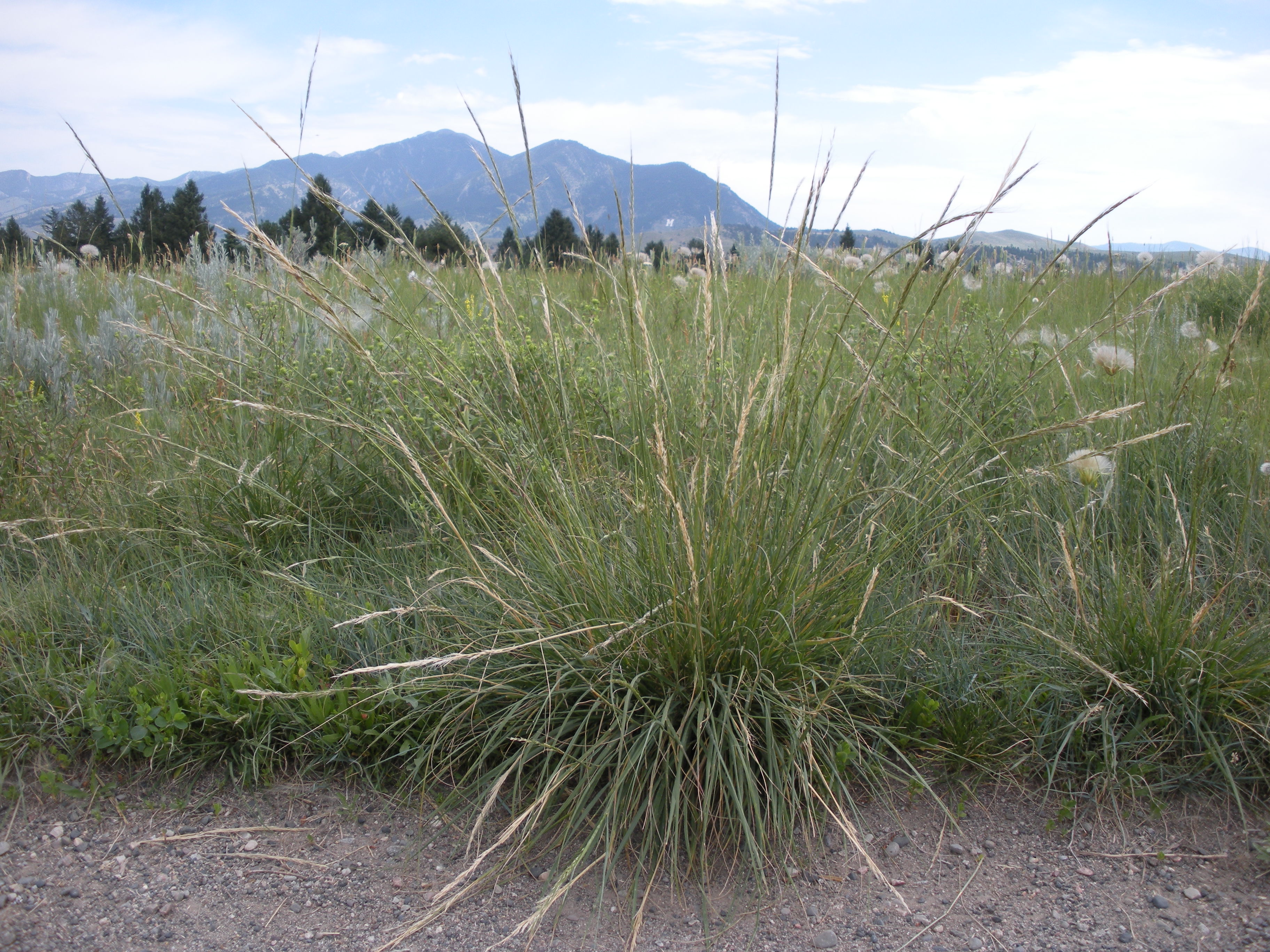

Conservation status
- Secure (NatureServe)

Scientific classification
- Kingdom: Plantae
- Clade: Tracheophytes
- Clade: Angiosperms
- Clade: Monocots
- Clade: Commelinids
- Order: Poales
- Family: Poaceae
- Subfamily: Pooideae
- Genus: Nassella
- Species: N. viridula

Binomial name
- Nassella viridula (Trin.) Barkworth

Synonyms
- Stipa viridula

= Nassella viridula =

Species of flowering plant

Nassella viridula is a species of grass known by the common name green needlegrass. It is native to North America, where it is widespread in western Canada and the western and central United States. It is introduced in parts of eastern North America.

This grass forms tufts of stems up to about 1.2 meters tall. It grows from a fibrous root network which may penetrate over 1.5 meters deep in the soil. The leaves are mostly basal. Each is up to 30 centimeters long and tapers to a threadlike tip. The spikelets have awns reaching nearly 4 centimeters long, each bent twice. The plant reproduces via seed and by tillering. The seeds may be dormant for a period of time and may require stratification to germinate.

This grass is found in many types of habitat, including disturbed areas where it acts as a pioneer species. It is also considered a climax species in some regions, such as North Dakota. It is a dominant species and an indicator species in a variety of habitat types. It tolerates a wide range of temperatures and it is drought-tolerant.

A number of animals utilize the plant for food and cover. Many waterfowl and other birds nest in it.
