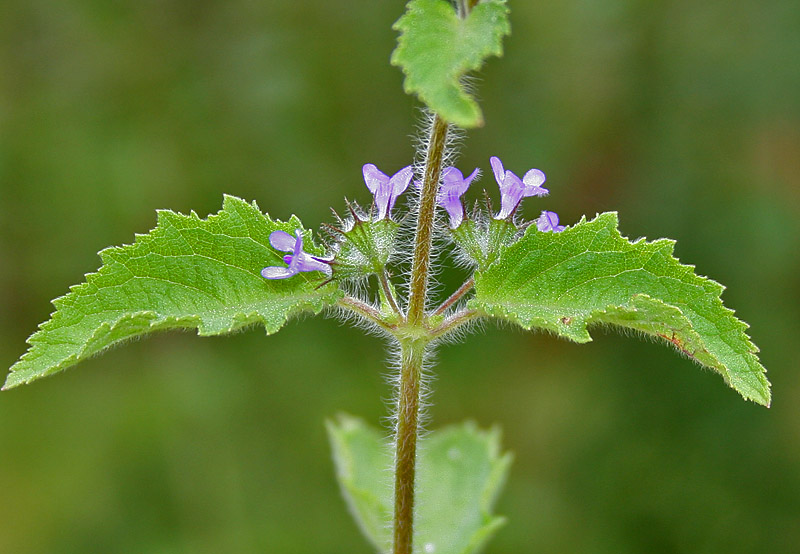
- Mesosphaerum suaveolens (Vilayti Tulsi) in Hyderabad

Scientific classification
- Kingdom: Plantae
- Clade: Embryophytes
- Clade: Tracheophytes
- Clade: Spermatophytes
- Clade: Angiosperms
- Clade: Eudicots
- Clade: Asterids
- Order: Lamiales
- Family: Lamiaceae
- Genus: Mesosphaerum
- Species: M. suaveolens

Binomial name
- Mesosphaerum suaveolens (L.) Kuntze

Synonyms
- Ballota suaveolens L.; Bystropogon graveolens Blume; Bystropogon suaveolens (L.) L'Hér.; Gnoteris cordata Raf.; Gnoteris villosa Raf.; Hyptis congesta Leonard; Hyptis ebracteata R.Br.; Hyptis graveolens Schrank; Hyptis plumieri Poit.; Hyptis suaveolens (L.) Poit.; Marrubium indicum Blanco; Schaueria graveolens (Blume) Hassk.

= Mesosphaerum suaveolens =

Species of flowering plant

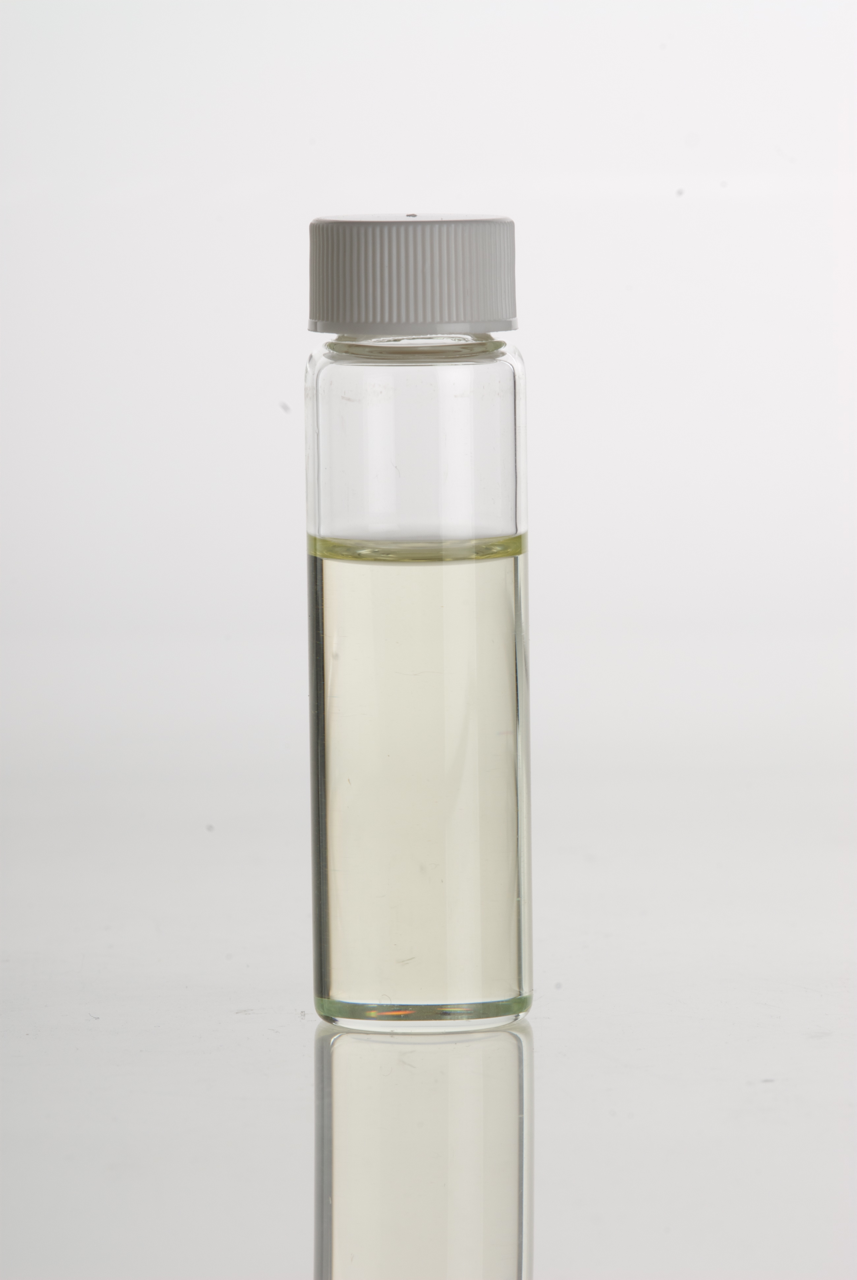
Hyptis suaveolens essential oil

Mesosphaerum suaveolens, synonym Hyptis suaveolens, chia, pignut, or chan, bukumbar is a branching pseudocereal plant native to tropical regions of Mexico, Central, the West Indies, and South America, as well as being naturalized in tropical parts of Africa, Asia and Australia. It is generally 1–1.5 m (3.3–4.9 ft) tall, occasionally up to 3 m (9.8 ft). Stems are hairy, and square in cross section. Leaves are oppositely arranged, 2–10 cm (0.79–3.94 in) long, with shallowly toothed margins, and emit a strong minty odor if crushed. Flowers are pink or purple, arranged in clusters of 1–5 in the upper leaf axils.

== Traditional uses ==
Studies have found that M. suaveolens is effective as an insecticide.

Mesosphaerum suaveolens can be made into a refreshing drink by soaking the seeds in water and refrigerating the mix. Some people add lemon or other citrus to improve the taste. In Colima, Mexico, people use the M. suaveolens seeds to prepare a traditional beverage called bate. The process consists in roasting and grinding the seeds and then mixing the resulting powder with water. M. suaveolens is also a traditional treatment for diarrhea.

== See also ==
- Salvia hispanica
