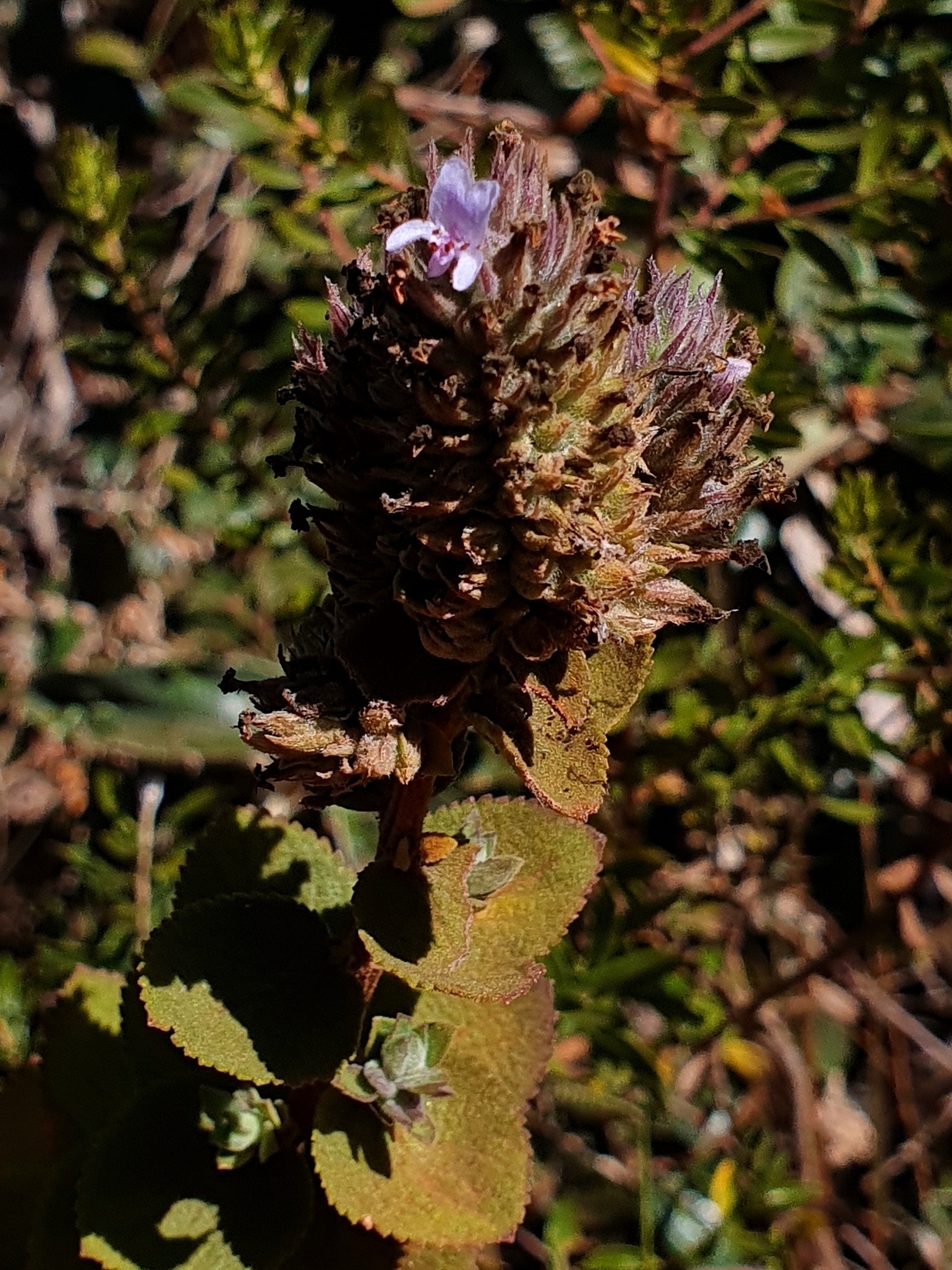
- Oocephalus grazielae in Brazil

Scientific classification
- Kingdom: Plantae
- Clade: Embryophytes
- Clade: Tracheophytes
- Clade: Angiosperms
- Clade: Eudicots
- Clade: Asterids
- Order: Lamiales
- Family: Lamiaceae
- Genus: Oocephalus (Benth.) Harley & J.F.B.Pastore

= Oocephalus =

Genus of plants

Oocephalus is a genus of flowering plants belonging to the family Lamiaceae.

Its native range is Brazil to Bolivia.

== Species ==
Species:

- Oocephalus argyrophyllus (Harley) Harley & J.F.B.Pastore
- Oocephalus crassifolius (Mart. ex Benth.) Harley & J.F.B.Pastore
- Oocephalus foliosus (A.St.-Hil. ex Benth.) Harley & J.F.B.Pastore
- Oocephalus ganevii Harley
- Oocephalus grazielae Harley
- Oocephalus hagei (Harley) Harley & J.F.B.Pastore
- Oocephalus halimifolius (Mart. ex Benth.) Harley & J.F.B.Pastore
- Oocephalus lacunosus (Pohl ex Benth.) Harley & J.F.B.Pastore
- Oocephalus lythroides (Pohl ex Benth.) Harley & J.F.B.Pastore
- Oocephalus niveus (Epling) Harley & J.F.B.Pastore
- Oocephalus nubicola (Harley) Harley & J.F.B.Pastore
- Oocephalus oppositiflorus (Schrank) Harley & J.F.B.Pastore
- Oocephalus pauciflorus (Harley) Harley & J.F.B.Pastore
- Oocephalus petraeus (A.St.-Hil. ex Benth.) Harley & J.F.B.Pastore
- Oocephalus piranii (Harley) Harley & J.F.B.Pastore
- Oocephalus pubescens A.Soares & Harley
- Oocephalus rigens Harley
- Oocephalus silvinae (Harley) Harley & J.F.B.Pastore
- Oocephalus tenuithyrsus Harley
