= Hyptis crenata =

Scientific classification
- Kingdom: Plantae
- Clade: Tracheophytes
- Clade: Angiosperms
- Clade: Eudicots
- Clade: Asterids
- Order: Lamiales
- Family: Lamiaceae
- Genus: Hyptis
- Species: H. crenata

Binomial name
- Hyptis crenata Pohl ex Benth.

Synonyms
- Homotypic Synonyms: List: Eriocoma crenata (Pohl ex Benth.) Kuntze (1891); Montanoa crenata (Pohl ex Benth.) Sch.Bip. ex K.Koch (1864); Mesosphaerum crenatum (Pohl ex Benth.) Kuntze (1891); Heterotypic Synonyms: List: Montanoa orbignyana Klatt (1882 publ. 1881); Hyptis crenata var. hirsuta Pohl ex J.A.Schmidt (1858); Hyptis crenata var. microphylla Pohl ex J.A.Schmidt (1858); Mesosphaerum crenatum var. albiflorum Kuntze (1898); Mesosphaerum crenatum var. subviolacum Kuntze (1898)

Species of flowering plant

Hyptis crenata, the Brazilian mint, is a shrub species of flowering plant in the family Lamiaceae, native to Bolivia and Brazil. The genus Hyptis is commonly known as the bushmints. It is traditionally used for pain relief in Brazil.
