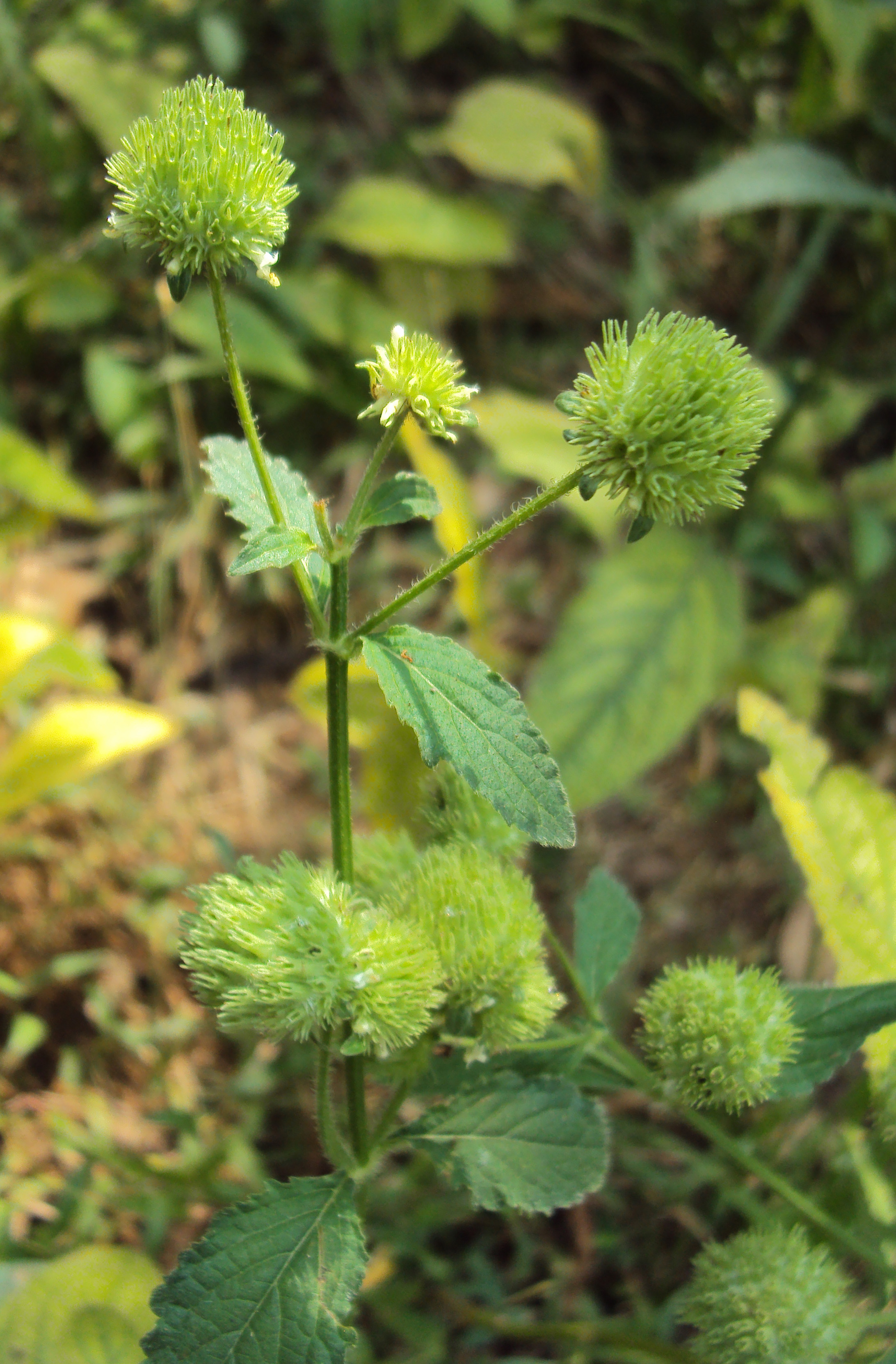

Scientific classification
- Kingdom: Plantae
- Clade: Tracheophytes
- Clade: Angiosperms
- Clade: Eudicots
- Clade: Asterids
- Order: Lamiales
- Family: Lamiaceae
- Genus: Hyptis
- Species: H. capitata

Binomial name
- Hyptis capitata Jacq.

Synonyms
- Clinopodium capitatum (Jacq.) Sw.; Hyptis capitata var. mariannarum (Briq.) Briq.; Hyptis capitata var. mexicana Briq.; Hyptis capitata var. pilosa Briq.; Hyptis capitata f. pilosa Donn.Sm.; Hyptis capitata var. vulgaris Briq.; Hyptis decurrens (Blanco) Epling; Hyptis mariannarum Briq.; Hyptis rhomboidea M.Martens & Galeotti; Mesosphaerum capitatum (Jacq.) Kuntze; Mesosphaerum rhombodeum (M.Martens & Galeotti) Kuntze; Pycnanthemum decurrens Blanco

= Hyptis capitata =

Species of flowering plant

Hyptis capitata, also known as false ironwort or knobweed, is a species of erect annual shrubs, of the plant family Lamiaceae. It is native to Florida, Mexico, Central America, the West Indies, and South America but naturalized in Australia, Southeast Asia, and some tropical islands. The plants grow up to a height of 1.5 meters. Crushed leaves are applied to cuts. It is considered a weed in many places.
