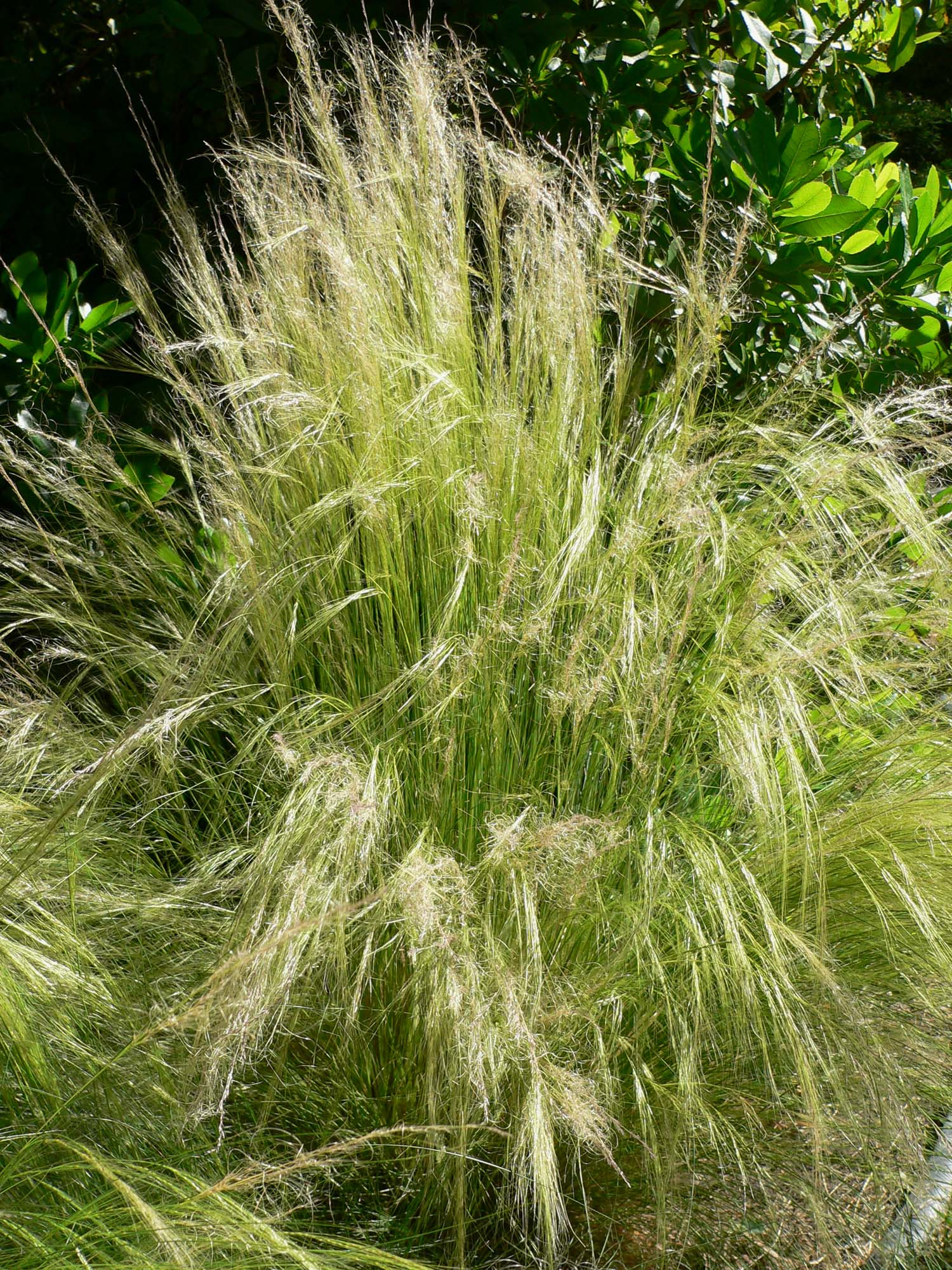

Scientific classification
- Kingdom: Plantae
- Clade: Tracheophytes
- Clade: Angiosperms
- Clade: Monocots
- Clade: Commelinids
- Order: Poales
- Family: Poaceae
- Subfamily: Pooideae
- Genus: Nassella
- Species: N. tenuissima

Binomial name
- Nassella tenuissima (Trin.) Barkworth

Synonyms
- Stipa cirrosa E.Fourn.; Stipa geniculata Phil.; Stipa mendocina Phil.; Stipa oreophila Speg.; Stipa subulata E.Fourn.; Stipa tenuissima Trin.

= Nassella tenuissima =

Species of grass

Nassella tenuissima is a species of grass known by the common names Mexican feathergrass, finestem needlegrass, fineleaved nassella, and Argentine needle-grass. It is native to the south-western United States, northern Mexico and Argentina. It is well-matched to climate in Australia and can be harmful to the Australian environment.

It is still widely referenced in botanical and horticultural literature under its synonym Stipa tenuissima, and has received the Royal Horticultural Society's Award of Garden Merit under that name.

== Impacts ==
It is sometimes used as an ornamental garden plant, but readily escapes, and has become naturalized in the San Francisco area.

=== In Australia ===
The availability of N. tenuissima via the internet and other plant purchasing situations makes its entry and naturalization in Australia almost inevitable.

It is similar in appearance to Nassella trichotoma (serrated tussock) and has been recorded in Australia as a weed initially mistaken for that other invasive species. N. tenuissima has been described by weed experts as a potential 'disaster for the Australian environment'. In Australia, it is considered a major threat to eucalypt woodlands and native grasslands, with government modelling indicating that up to 169 million hectares could be at risk.

N. tenuissima is also likely to have significant impacts on beef and wool production. It is closely related to serrated tussock (N. trichotoma) and Chilean needle grass (N. neesiana), both designated Weeds of National Significance because they displace pasture grasses and produce seeds that contaminate wool. Serrated tussock, which is estimated to cost New South Wales agriculture more than $40 million annually, is said to be causing a greater reduction in pasture carrying capacity than any other weed in Australia, yet N. tenuissima is thought to be capable of occupying 6 times the area predicted for serrated tussock.

==== Pathways ====
It is illegal to import N. tenuissima into Australia but it has been imported as a nursery plant under incorrect or outdated names. For example, in 2009 a nursery imported N. tenuissima seeds by incorrectly labelling them as Stipa lessingiana, which is a permitted import. A similar violation occurred in 1996 when a Victorian nursery imported the seeds by labelling with an earlier valid scientific name, Stipa tenuissima. Mexican feathergrass has also been sold by a nursery in NSW as a native grass 'elegant spear Austrostipa elegantissima'. eBay has banned sale of N. tenuissima to Australian buyers, but some sellers sell it under the outdated name S. teniuissima to circumvent the ban.

==== Biosecurity ====
According to weed experts, the multiple quarantine breaches highlight the critical need for national risk reduction programs to ensure correct labelling, monitor online sales and enforce biosecurity laws to prevent illegal sales.
