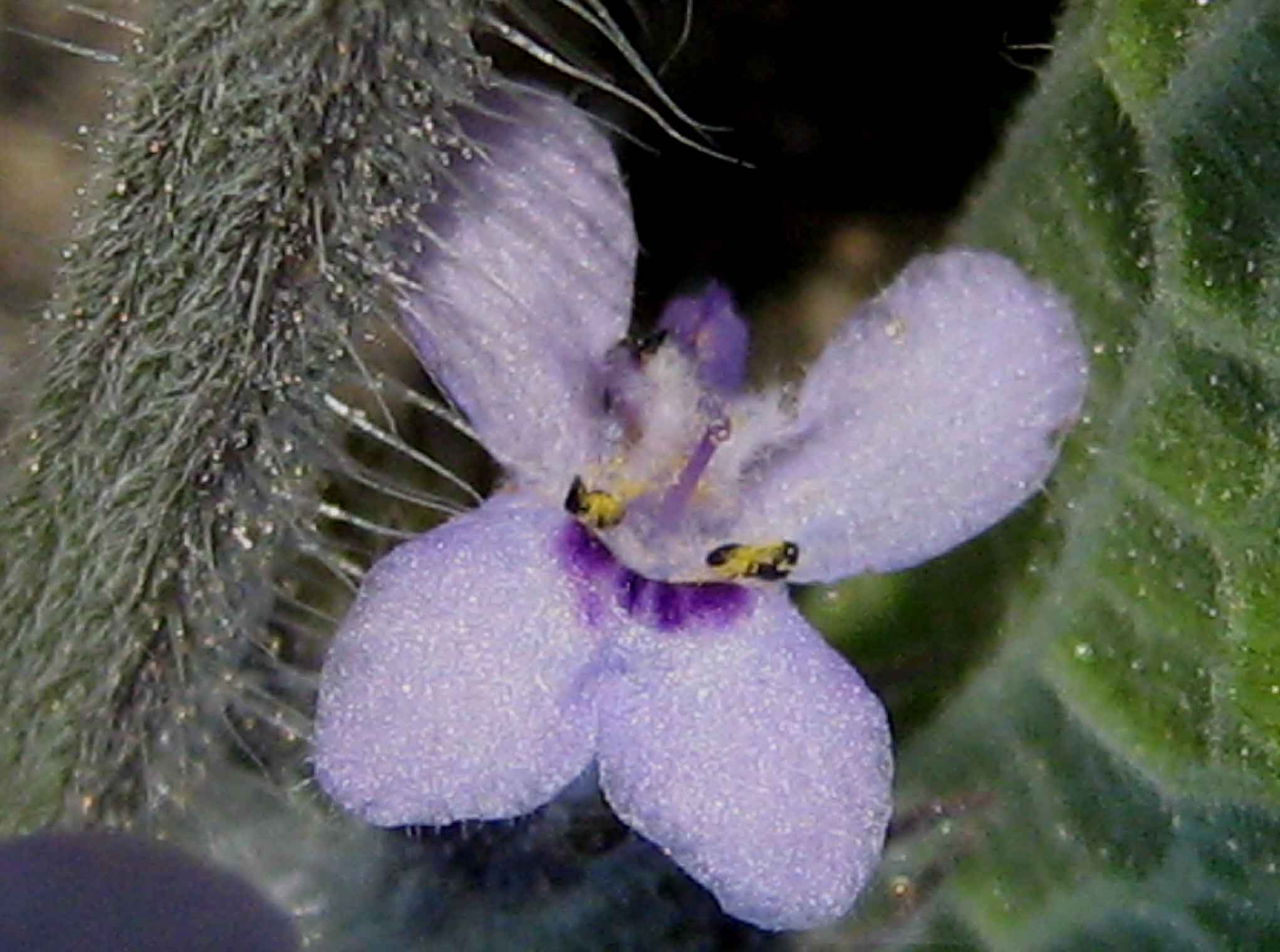
- Mesosphaerum suaveolens

Scientific classification
- Kingdom: Plantae
- Clade: Embryophytes
- Clade: Tracheophytes
- Clade: Angiosperms
- Clade: Eudicots
- Clade: Asterids
- Order: Lamiales
- Family: Lamiaceae
- Subfamily: Nepetoideae
- Tribe: Ocimeae
- Genus: Mesosphaerum; P.Browne

Species
- See text

Synonyms
- List: Brotera Spreng.; Gnoteris Raf.; Schaueria Hassk.

= Mesosphaerum =

Genus of flowering plants

Mesosphaerum is a genus of flowering plants in the family Lamiaceae, native to the New World Tropics and Subtropics. Two species, Mesosphaerum pectinatum and Mesosphaerum suaveolens, have been introduced to the Old World, with M. suaveolens found in the tropics of Africa, Asia and Australia.

== Species ==
Currently accepted species include:

- Mesosphaerum argutifolium (Epling) Harley & J.F.B.Pastore
- Mesosphaerum asperifolium (Standl.) Harley & J.F.B.Pastore
- Mesosphaerum caatingense Harley & J.F.B.Pastore
- Mesosphaerum chacapoyense (Briq.) Harley & J.F.B.Pastore
- Mesosphaerum collinum (Brandegee) Harley & J.F.B.Pastore
- Mesosphaerum diffusum (Epling) Harley & J.F.B.Pastore
- Mesosphaerum diversifolium (Benth.) Kuntze
- Mesosphaerum eriocephalum (Benth.) Kuntze
- Mesosphaerum gymnocaulon (Epling) Harley & J.F.B.Pastore
- Mesosphaerum irwinii (Harley) Harley & J.F.B.Pastore
- Mesosphaerum lachnosphaerium (Epling) Harley & J.F.B.Pastore
- Mesosphaerum marrubiifolium (Epling & Mathias) Harley & J.F.B.Pastore
- Mesosphaerum melissoides (Kunth) Kuntze
- Mesosphaerum oblongifolium (Benth.) Kuntze
- Mesosphaerum obtusatum (Benth.) Kuntze
- Mesosphaerum pectinatum (L.) Kuntze
- Mesosphaerum perbullatum (Fern.Alonso) Harley & J.F.B.Pastore
- Mesosphaerum pilosum (Benth.) Kuntze
- Mesosphaerum pseudoglaucum (Epling) Harley & J.F.B.Pastore
- Mesosphaerum purdiei (Benth.) Kuntze
- Mesosphaerum septentrionale (Epling) Harley & J.F.B.Pastore
- Mesosphaerum sidifolium (L'Hér.) Harley & J.F.B.Pastore
- Mesosphaerum suaveolens (L.) Kuntze
- Mesosphaerum urticoides (Kunth) Kuntze
