= Étienne-Émile Desvaux =

French botanist (1830–1854)

- Born: February 8, 1830; Vendôme, France
- Died: May 13, 1854 (aged 24); Mondoubleau, France
- Scientific career
- Fields: Botany
- Author abbrev. (botany): É.Desv.

Étienne-Émile Desvaux (8 February 1830, in Vendôme – 13 May 1854, in Mondoubleau) was a French botanist.

He developed an interest in botany at an early age, actively collecting plants from the age of 10. In July 1850, he earned his Bachelor of Science degree in Paris. He died on May 13, 1854 (age 24) in the town of Mondoubleau.

He was the author of a monograph on Chilean grasses called "Gramineae Chilenses" (1853), a work that was included in Claude Gay's "Historia física y política de Chile". He described the genus Monandraira (synonym Deschampsia) and was the binomial authority of numerous grass species.
