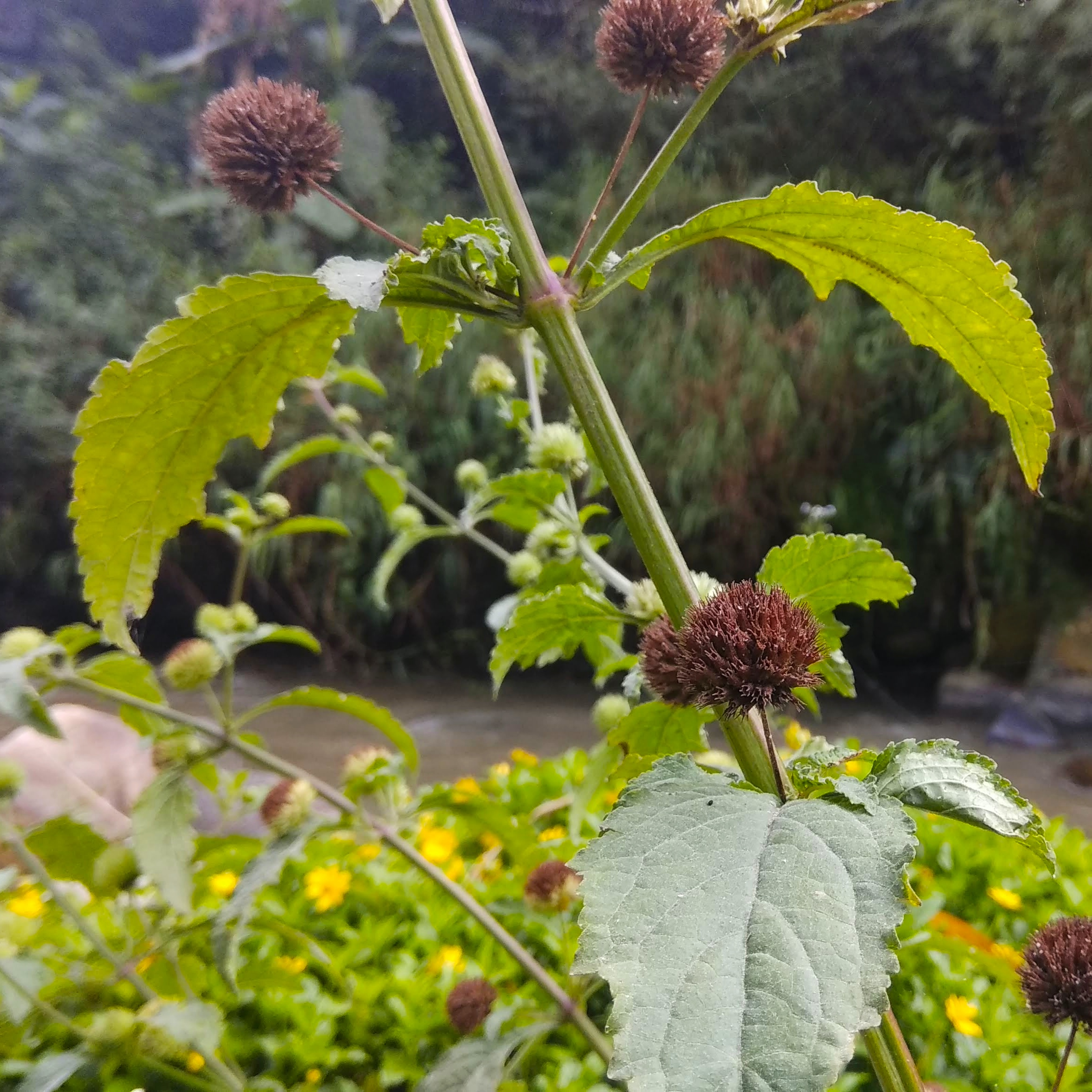

Scientific classification
- Kingdom: Plantae
- Clade: Tracheophytes
- Clade: Angiosperms
- Clade: Eudicots
- Clade: Asterids
- Order: Lamiales
- Family: Lamiaceae
- Genus: Hyptis
- Species: H. brevipes

Binomial name
- Hyptis brevipes Poit.

Synonyms
- Hyptis acuta Benth

= Hyptis brevipes =

Species of flowering plant

Hyptis brevipes is a species of flowering plant in the genus Hyptis. These plants known commonly as lesser roundweed, nanto-iganigakusa (Taiwan), genggeyan and kaneja (Indonesia), sawi hutan (Malaysia), ortela-brava and fazendeiro (Brazil). Hyptis brevipes is an erect annual plant up to 1 m high with the typical square stem of a labiate, often densely hairy but sometimes less so. Leaves are also normally coarsely hairy on both surfaces, opposite, narrowly ovate or lanceolate, 5–7 cm long, up to 2 cm wide, cuneate at the base, the margins irregularly serrate. The inflorescence is a dense raceme, almost globose, up to 14 mm diameter, on a peduncle about 1 cm long in the axils of most upper leaves. Corolla or petals are white, irregularly five-lobed, and about 5 mm long. The calyx, 4 mm long, also has five narrow, finely barbed lobes. Seeds are ovoid, up to 1 mm long, dark brown to black, obscurely striate, with a conspicuous scar.
