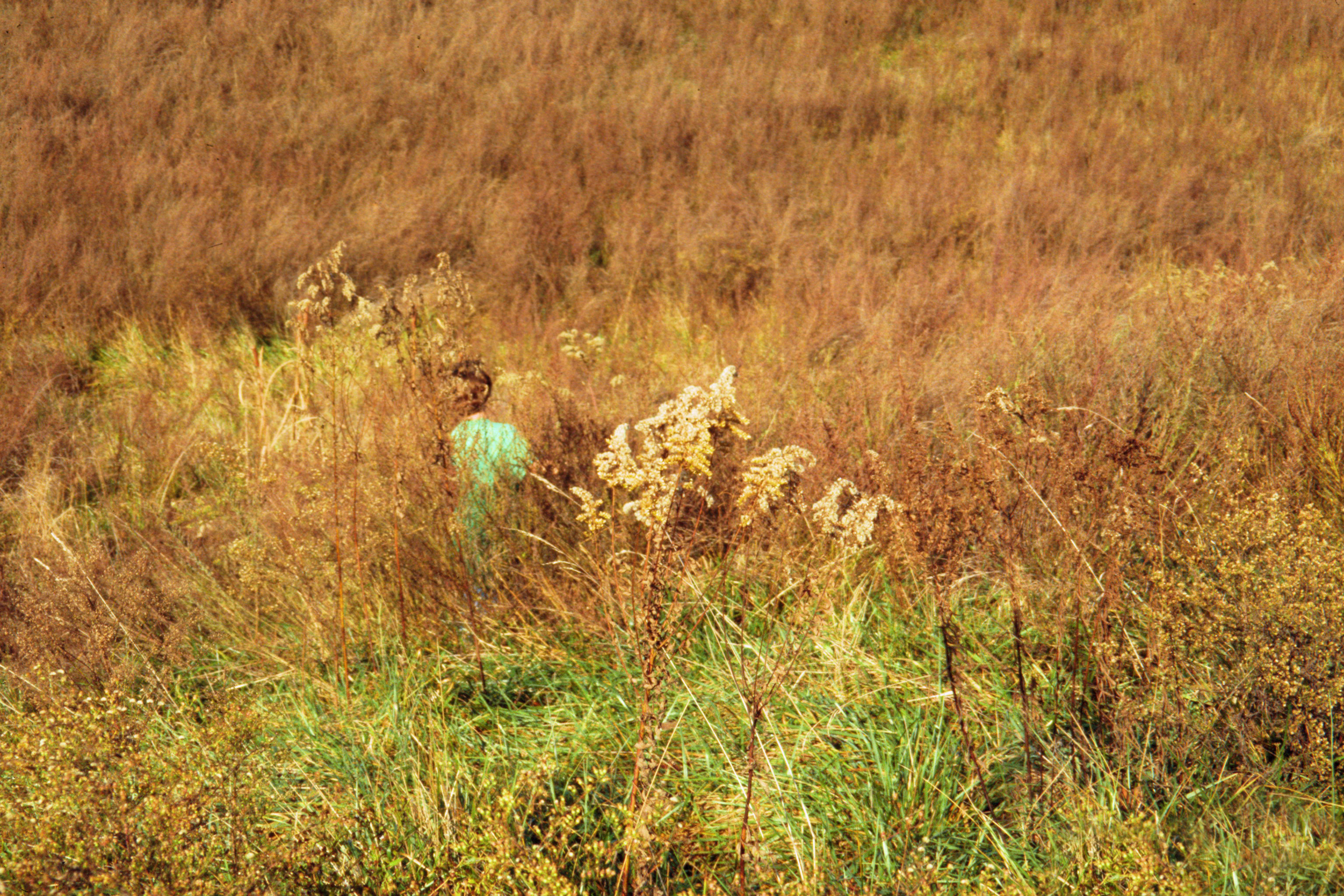

Scientific classification
- Kingdom: Plantae
- Clade: Tracheophytes
- Clade: Angiosperms
- Clade: Monocots
- Clade: Commelinids
- Order: Poales
- Family: Poaceae
- Subfamily: Pooideae
- Genus: Nassella
- Species: N. trichotoma

Binomial name
- Nassella trichotoma (Hack. ex Arech.)

Synonyms
- Agrostis trichotoma (Nees) Trin.; Caryochloa trichotoma (Nees) Kuntze; Oryzopsis trichotoma (Nees) Druce; Piptatherum macratherum (Steud.) Nees ex B.D.Jacks.; Piptochaetium trichotomum (Nees) Griseb.; Stipa macrathera (Steud.) Speg. nom. illeg.; Stipa tenella Godr.; Stipa trichotoma Nees; Urachne macrathera Steud.; Urachne trichotoma (Nees) Trin.

= Nassella trichotoma =

Species of plant

Nassella trichotoma, commonly known as the serrated tussock, is a type of bunchgrass plant, native in Argentina, Uruguay, Chile, and Peru.

It is on the list of Weeds of National Significance in Australia, reducing the productivity of pasture and creating a fire hazard. In many states, landowners are required by law to keep their land free of this plant. Herbicides that control the plant are generally expensive monetarily, contributing to its growth in countries such as Australia.

In New Zealand is classed as an unwanted organism by Biosecurity New Zealand and is under strict control regimes by some of the regional councils.

== Characteristics ==
Nassella trichotoma tends to grow cespitose (in dense tufts), and stands about 20 cm (7.9 inches) to 60 cm (24 inches) tall. The branches usually grow between two and 6 cm (2.4 inches) long, and the caryopses (simple fruits) grow around 1.2 mm (0.047 in) long. The plants tend to produce a large quantity of seeds, utilizing the wind to spread them over long distances. The plant is similar in appearance and size to indigenous plants of Oceania, which caused a delay in it being recognized as a serious weed.

== See also ==
- Nassella tenuissima
