= José Arechavaleta =

Spanish naturalist (1838–1912)

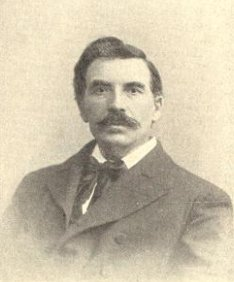
José Arechavaleta (1838–1912)

José Arechavaleta (27 September 1838, Urioste, near Bilbao – 16 June 1912, Montevideo) was a Spanish-born pharmacist, geologist and naturalist, active in Uruguay.

At the age of 18, he emigrated to Uruguay, where he made the acquaintanceship of botanist José Ernesto Gibert (1818–1886). In 1862 he obtained a degree in pharmacy, and later taught classes in botany, zoology and natural history at the University of the Republic in Montevideo. In 1892 he was appointed general director of the natural history museum in Montevideo, a position he kept until his death in 1912.

In Uruguay, he studied and collected insects from all parts of the country, being particularly interested in Coleoptera. As a botanist, he published a major work on grasses native to the country. He is credited with establishing bacteriology laboratories at the University Institute of Experimental Hygiene. In 1899 the plant genus Arechavaletaia was named in his honor by Carlos Luigi Spegazzini.

== Principal works ==
- Las gramíneas uruguayas, 1894 - Gramineae of Uruguay.
- Flora uruguaya; enumeración y descripción breve de las plantas conocidas hasta hoy y de algunas nuevas que nacen espontaneamente y viven en la República Uruguaya, 1901 - Uruguayan flora, list and brief description of the plants known in the Uruguayan Republic.

== Honors ==
Some botanical species were named in Arechavaleta's honor:

- (Arecaceae) Cocos arechavaletana Barb.Rodr.
- (Malvaceae) Pavonia arechavaletana Krapov. & Fryxell
