= Veydelevka steppe =

- Gniloye
- IUCN category IV (habitat/species management area)
- Location within Russia
- Location: Belgorod Oblast
- Nearest city: Valuyki
- Coordinates: 50°3′59″N 38°31′29″E
- Area: 60 hectares (148 acres; 0 sq mi)

The Veydelevka steppe is an area of remnant steppe vegetation in Veydelevsky District, Belgorod Oblast in Russia. Together with a small tract of adjacent forest, it forms part of the Gniloye conservation area.

Most of the reserve is covered in feather grass steppe dominated by Stipa tirsa. It contains a number of endangered plant species, including Bulbocodium versicolor, Iris humilis, Stipa pennata, Matthiola fragrans and Hedysarum grandiflorum. There are also a fairly large number of Paeonia tenuifolia, a symbol of Veydelevsky District that is depicted on its coat of arms.
