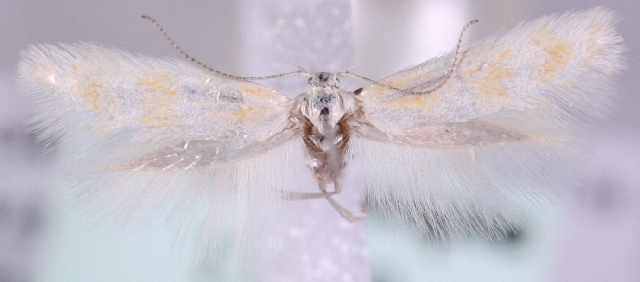

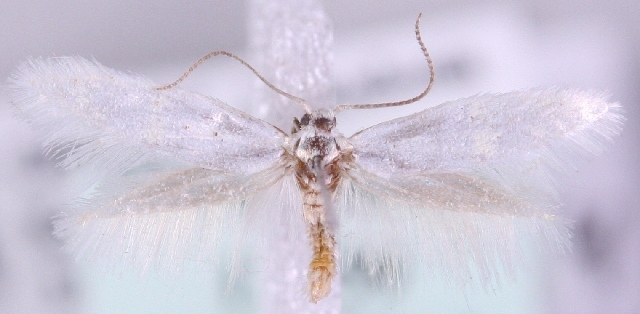

Scientific classification
- Domain: Eukaryota
- Kingdom: Animalia
- Phylum: Arthropoda
- Class: Insecta
- Order: Lepidoptera
- Family: Elachistidae
- Genus: Elachista
- Species: E. heringi

Binomial name
- Elachista heringi Rebel, 1899

= Elachista heringi =

Species of moth

Elachista heringi is a moth of the family Elachistidae. It is found from the Czech Republic to Spain and Italy and from France to Romania. It is also found in Russia.

The wingspan is 9–10 millimetres (0.35–0.39 in).

The larvae feed on Stipa pennata and Stipa pulcherrima. They mine the leaves of their host plant.
