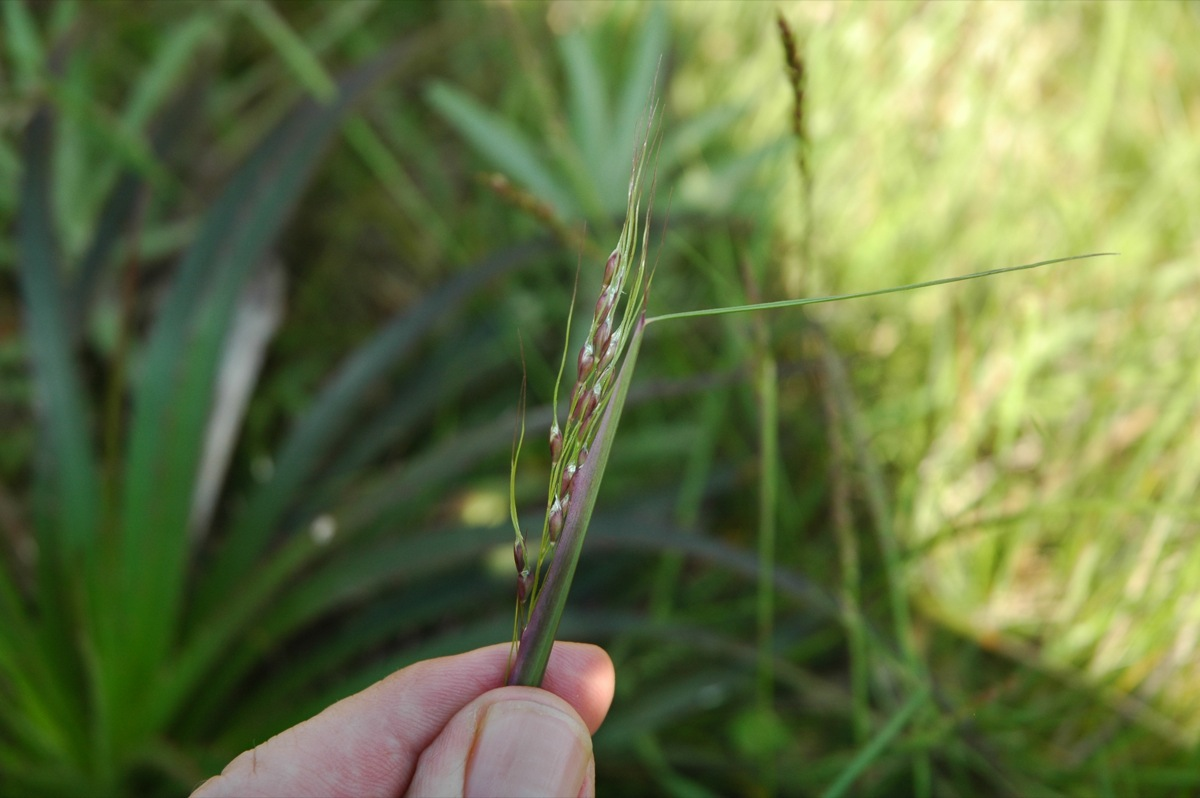
- Piptochaetium sp.

Scientific classification
- Kingdom: Plantae
- Clade: Tracheophytes
- Clade: Angiosperms
- Clade: Monocots
- Clade: Commelinids
- Order: Poales
- Family: Poaceae
- Subfamily: Pooideae
- Supertribe: Stipodae
- Tribe: Stipeae
- Genus: Piptochaetium; J.Presl

Type species
- Piptochaetium setifolium (syn of P. panicoides) J.Presl

Synonyms
- Urachne subg. Piptochaetium (J. Presl) Trin. & Rupr.; Podopogon Raf., rejected name; Caryochloa Spreng. 1827, illegitimate homonym not Trin. 1826

= Piptochaetium =

Genus of plants

Piptochaetium, or speargrass, is a genus of plants in the grass family, native to North and South America. Piptochaetium is a bunchgrass genus in the tribe Stipeae.

Some of its species have been included in the genus Stipa by some authors.

Species

- Piptochaetium alpinum - Santa Catarina, Rio Grande do Sul
- Piptochaetium angolense - Coquimbo
- Piptochaetium angustifolium - Coahuila, Tamaulipas, Nuevo León, México State
- Piptochaetium avenaceum — black oatgrass, blackseed needlegrass - United States (Texas to Florida north to Massachusetts + Michigan), Ontario, Tamaulipas, Nuevo León
- Piptochaetium avenacioides - Florida speargrass - Florida
- Piptochaetium bicolor - Rio Grande do Sul, Argentina, Uruguay, Chile incl Juan Fernández Islands
- Piptochaetium brachyspermum - Buenos Aires
- Piptochaetium brevicalyx - central + eastern Mexico
- Piptochaetium burkartianum - Corrientes
- Piptochaetium cabrerae - Buenos Aires
- Piptochaetium calvescens - Buenos Aires, Uruguay
- Piptochaetium confusum - Uruguay, Rio Grande do Sul, Entre Rios
- Piptochaetium cucullatum - Uruguay
- Piptochaetium featherstonei - Peru, Bolivia
- Piptochaetium fimbriatum - pinyon ricegrass - Arizona, Texas, New Mexico, Mexico, Guatemala
- Piptochaetium hackelii - Argentina, Uruguay
- Piptochaetium hirtum - Chile
- Piptochaetium indutum - Ecuador, Peru, Bolivia, Salta, Jujuy
- Piptochaetium jubatum - Uruguay
- Piptochaetium lasianthum - Uruguay, Argentina, Santa Catarina, Rio Grande do Sul
- Piptochaetium leiopodum - Buenos Aires, Uruguay
- Piptochaetium medium - Uruguay, Argentina, Brazil, Venezuela
- Piptochaetium montevidense - Uruguayan ricegrass - Argentina, Chile, Uruguay, Brazil, Paraguay, Bolivia, Peru, Ecuador, Venezuela
- Piptochaetium napostaense - Argentina
- Piptochaetium palustre - Santa Catarina
- Piptochaetium panicoides - Argentina, Chile, Uruguay, Brazil, Colombia, Bolivia, Peru, Ecuador, Venezuela
- Piptochaetium pringlei - Pringle's speargrass - Arizona, Texas, New Mexico, Mexico
- Piptochaetium ruprechtianum - Uruguay, Argentina, Brazil
- Piptochaetium sagasteguii - Peru
- Piptochaetium seleri - Mexico, Guatemala
- Piptochaetium setosum - bristly speargrass - Chile
- Piptochaetium stipoides - purple speargrass - Argentina, Chile, Uruguay, Brazil, Colombia; naturalized in Mexico, California
- Piptochaetium tovarii - Peru
- Piptochaetium uruguense - Argentina, Uruguay, Santa Catarina, Rio Grande do Sul, Paraguay, San Luis Potosí
- Piptochaetium virescens - Mexico, Guatemala

formerly included

see Nassella Stipa

- Piptochaetium collinum - Nassella laevissima
- Piptochaetium gibbum - Nassella gibba
- Piptochaetium laeve - Nassella pubiflora
- Piptochaetium laevissimum - Nassella laevissima
- Piptochaetium mexicanum - Nassella mexicana
- Piptochaetium mucronatum - Nassella mucronata
- Piptochaetium ovatum - Stipa ovata
- Piptochaetium trichotomum - Nassella trichotoma
