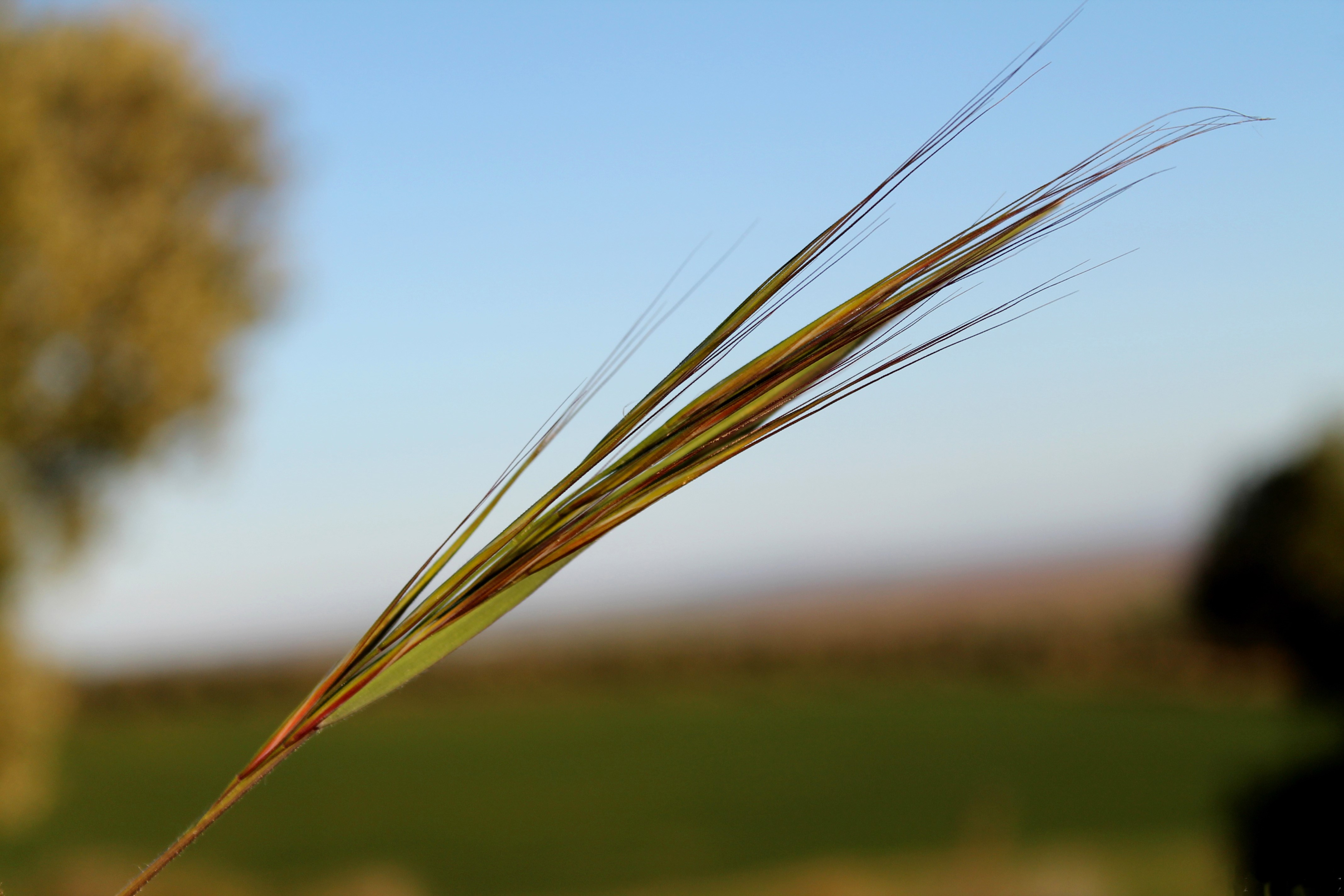
- Mediterranean needle-grass, Stipa capensis

Scientific classification
- Kingdom: Plantae
- Clade: Tracheophytes
- Clade: Angiosperms
- Clade: Monocots
- Clade: Commelinids
- Order: Poales
- Family: Poaceae
- Subfamily: Pooideae
- Supertribe: Stipodae
- Tribe: Stipeae
- Genus: Stipa; L.

Species
- 141, see text

= Stipa =

Genus of grasses

Stipa is a genus of about 140 species of large perennial hermaphroditic grasses collectively known as feather grass, needle grass, and spear grass. They are placed in the subfamily Pooideae and the tribe Stipeae, which also contains many species formerly assigned to Stipa, which have since been reclassified into new genera.

Many species are important forage crops. Several species such as Stipa brachytricha, S. arundinacea, S. splendens, S. gigantea and S. pulchra are used as ornamental plants. One former species, esparto grass (Macrochloa tenacissima), is used for crafts and extensively in paper making.

It is a coarse grass with inrolled leaves and a panicle patterned inflorescence.

== Ecology ==
Species of the genus Stipa can occur in grasslands or in savanna habitats. Certain specific prairie plant associations are dominated by grasses of the genus Stipa, which genus often lends its name to the terminology of some prairie types. In some areas of the western United States grasses of the genus Stipa form a significant part of the understory of Blue Oak savannas, and were even a more important element prehistorically before the invasion of many European grasses.

== Species ==
As of August 2025, Plants of the World Online accepted 141 species and primary hybrids.

- Stipa academica Hicken
- Stipa × adamii M.Nobis
- Stipa adoxa Klokov & Osychnyuk
- Stipa aktauensis Roshev.
- Stipa × alaica Pazij
- Stipa × albasiensis L.Q.Zhao & K.Guo
- Stipa aliena Keng
- Stipa almeriensis F.M.Vázquez
- Stipa annua Mez
- Stipa apertifolia Martinovský
- Stipa arabica Trin. & Rupr.
- Stipa araxensis Grossh.
- Stipa arenosa (Tzvelev) M.Nobis, P.D.Gudkova, Krzempek & Klichowska
- Stipa argillosa Kotukhov
- Stipa asperella Klokov & Osychnyuk
- Stipa × assyriaca Hand.-Mazz.
- Stipa atlantica P.A.Smirn.
- Stipa austroaltaica Kotukhov
- Stipa austroitalica Martinovský
- Stipa austromongolica M.Nobis
- Stipa badachschanica Roshev.
- Stipa baicalensis Roshev.
- Stipa balansae H.Scholz
- Stipa × balkanabatica M.Nobis & P.D.Gudkova
- Stipa barbata Desf.
- Stipa barrancaensis F.A.Roig
- Stipa basiplumosa Munro ex Hook.f.
- Stipa bavarica Martinovský & H.Scholz
- Stipa baxoiensis Yue Zhang & W.L.Chen
- Stipa borysthenica Klokov ex Prokudin
- Stipa brachyptera Klokov
- Stipa × brevicallosa M.Nobis
- Stipa breviflora Griseb.
- Stipa breviseta Caro & E.A.Sánchez
- Stipa × brozhiana M.Nobis
- Stipa bungeana Trin.
- Stipa capillacea Keng
- Stipa capillata L.
- Stipa caucasica Schmalh.
- Stipa × consanguinea Trin. & Rupr.
- Stipa cretacea P.A.Smirn.
- Stipa × czerepanovii Kotukhov
- Stipa daghestanica Grossh.
- Stipa dasyphylla (Lindem.) Czern. ex Trautv.
- Stipa dasyvaginata Martinovský
- Stipa diastrophica F.A.Roig
- Stipa dickorei M.Nobis
- Stipa donetzica Chuprina
- Stipa dregeana Steud.
- Stipa drobovii (Tzvelev) Czerep.
- Stipa durifolia Parodi ex Torres
- Stipa × dzungarica M.Nobis
- Stipa ehrenbergiana Trin. & Rupr.
- Stipa endotricha Martinovský
- Stipa × fallacina Klokov & Osychnyuk
- Stipa × fallax M.Nobis & A.Nowak
- Stipa feltrina Moraldo, Lasen & Argenti
- Stipa gaubae Bor
- Stipa × gegarkunii P.A.Smirn.
- Stipa glareosa P.A.Smirn.
- Stipa × gnezdilloi Pazij
- Stipa gracilis Roshev.
- Stipa grandis P.A.Smirn.
- Stipa hans-meyeri Pilg.
- Stipa henryi Rendle
- Stipa × heptapotamica Golosk.
- Stipa himalaica Roshev.
- Stipa × hissarica M.Nobis
- Stipa hoggarensis Chrtek & Martinovský
- Stipa hohenackeriana Trin. & Rupr.
- Stipa holosericea Trin.
- Stipa iberica Martinovský
- Stipa illimanica Hack.
- Stipa iranica Freitag
- Stipa isoldeae H.Scholz
- Stipa issaevii Mussajev & Sadychov
- Stipa juncea L.
- Stipa juncoides Speg.
- Stipa × kamelinii Kotukhov
- Stipa karakabinica Kotukhov
- Stipa karataviensis Roshev.
- Stipa karjaginii Mussajev & Sadychov
- Stipa kempirica Kotukhov
- Stipa keniensis (Pilg.) Freitag
- Stipa khovdensis L.Q.Zhao
- Stipa kirghisorum P.A.Smirn.
- Stipa klimesii M.Nobis
- Stipa korshinskyi Roshev.
- Stipa kotuchovii M.Nobis
- Stipa krylovii Roshev.
- Stipa × ladakhensis M.Nobis, Klichowska, A.Nowak & P.D.Gudkova
- Stipa lagascae Roem. & Schult.
- Stipa larisae Ostapko
- Stipa leptogluma Pilg.
- Stipa lessingiana Trin. & Rupr.
- Stipa letourneuxii Trab.
- Stipa lingua Junge
- Stipa lipskyi Roshev.
- Stipa longiplumosa Roshev.
- Stipa macbridei Hitchc.
- Stipa macroglossa P.A.Smirn.
- Stipa magnifica Junge
- Stipa × majalis Klokov
- Stipa × manrakica Kotukhov
- Stipa margelanica P.A.Smirn.
- Stipa martinovskyi Klokov
- Stipa mayeri Martinovský
- Stipa media (Speg.) Caro
- Stipa meridionalis F.M.Vázquez & Devesa
- Stipa milleana Hitchc.
- Stipa mongolorum Tzvelev
- Stipa munroana Bor
- Stipa nachiczevanica Mussajev & Sadychov
- Stipa narynica M.Nobis
- Stipa nitens (Ball) Ball
- Stipa novakii Martinovský
- Stipa offneri Breistr.
- Stipa okmirii A.V.Dengubenko
- Stipa orientalis Trin.
- Stipa ovczinnikovii Roshev.
- Stipa penicillata Hand.-Mazz.
- Stipa pennata L. – feather grass
- Stipa petriei Buchanan
- Stipa plumosa Trin.
- Stipa polyclada Hack.
- Stipa pontica P.A.Smirn.
- Stipa przewalskyi Roshev.
- Stipa × pseudocapillata Roshev.
- Stipa × pseudomacroglossa M.Nobis
- Stipa pugionata Caro & E.A.Sánchez
- Stipa pulcherrima K.Koch
- Stipa pungens Nees & Meyen
- Stipa purpurea Griseb.
- Stipa rechingeri Martinovský
- Stipa regeliana Hack.
- Stipa richteriana Kar. & Kir.
- Stipa roborowskyi Roshev.
- Stipa rohmooiana Noltie
- Stipa rosea Hitchc.
- Stipa sareptana A.K.Becker
- Stipa scholzii Valdés
- Stipa scirpea Speg.
- Stipa sczerbakovii Kotukhov
- Stipa shanxiensis B.Nie & W.Hao Zhang
- Stipa sicula Moraldo, la Valva, Ricciardi & Caputo
- Stipa sosnowskyi Seredin
- Stipa subaristata (Matthei) Caro & E.A.Sánchez
- Stipa × subdrobovii M.Nobis & A.Nowak
- Stipa subplumosa Hicken ex F.A.Roig
- Stipa subsessiliflora (Rupr.) Roshev.
- Stipa syreistschikowii P.A.Smirn.
- Stipa × tadzhikistanica M.Nobis
- Stipa × talassica Pazij
- Stipa tianschanica Roshev.
- Stipa tigrensis Chiov.
- Stipa tirsa Steven
- Stipa tortuosa É.Desv.
- Stipa transcarpatica Klokov
- Stipa tremula (Rupr.) M.Nobis
- Stipa trichoides P.A.Smirn.
- Stipa tulcanensis Mez (unplaced)
- Stipa turkestanica Hack.
- Stipa × tzveleviana Kotukhov
- Stipa × tzvelevii Ikonn.
- Stipa ucrainica P.A.Smirn.
- Stipa × zaissanica Kotukhov
- Stipa zalesskii Wilensky
- Stipa zeravshanica M.Nobis
- Stipa zhadaensis L.Q.Zhao & K.Guo
- Stipa zuvantica Tzvelev

=== Formerly placed here ===
- Achnatherum calamagrostis (L.) P.Beauv. (as S. calamagrostis (L.) Wahlenb.)
- Achnatherum robustum (Vasey) Barkworth (as S. robusta (Vasey) Scribn.)
- Anemanthele lessoniana (Steud.) Veldkamp (as Stipa arundinacea Hook.f.)
- Celtica gigantea (Link) F. M. Vazquez & Barkworth (as S. gigantea Link)
- Eriocoma arida (M.E.Jones) Romasch. (as Stipa arida M.E.Jones and S. mormonum Mez)
- Eriocoma hymenoides (Roem. & Schult.) Rydb. (as S. hymenoides Roem. & Schult.)
- Hesperostipa comata (Trin. & Rupr.) Barkworth (as Stipa comata Trin. & Rupr.)
- Hesperostipa spartea (Trin.) Barkworth (as Stipa spartea Trin.)
- Jarava ichu Ruiz & Pav. (as S. ichu (Ruiz & Pav.) Kunth)
- Nassella hyalina (Nees) Barkworth (as Stipa hyalina Nees and S. avenacea Spreng. ex Trin. & Rupr.)
- Nassella leucotricha (Trin. & Rupr.) R.W.Pohl (as S. leucotricha Trin. & Rupr.)
- Nassella mexicana (Hitchc.) R.W.Pohl (as Stipa mexicana Hitchc.)
- Nassella pulchra (Hitchc.) Barkworth (as S. pulchra Hitchc.)
- Nassella viridula (Trin.) Barkworth (as S. viridula Trin.)
- Neotrinia splendens (Trin.) M.Nobis, P.D.Gudkova & A.Nowak (as S. splendens Trin.)
- Pappostipa speciosa (Trin. & Rupr.) Romasch. (as Stipa speciosa Trin. & Rupr.)
- Patis coreana (Honda) Ohwi (as Stipa coreana Honda) – Korean needlegrass
- Piptochaetium avenaceum (L.) Parodi (as Stipa avenacea L.)
- Piptochaetium virescens (Kunth) Parodi (as Stipa virescens Kunth and S. avenacea Willd. ex Steud.)
- Stipellula capensis (Thunb.) Röser & Hamasha (as Stipa capensis Thunb.)

== See also ==
- Nassella
