= Stipa avenacea =

Stipa avenacea is a taxon synonym for three species of grasses:

- Stipa avenacea L. – synonym of Piptochaetium avenaceum (L.) Parodi
- Stipa avenacea Spreng. ex Trin. & Rupr. – synonym of Nassella hyalina (Nees) Barkworth
- Stipa avenacea Willd. ex Steud. – synonym of Piptochaetium virescens (Kunth) Parodi
