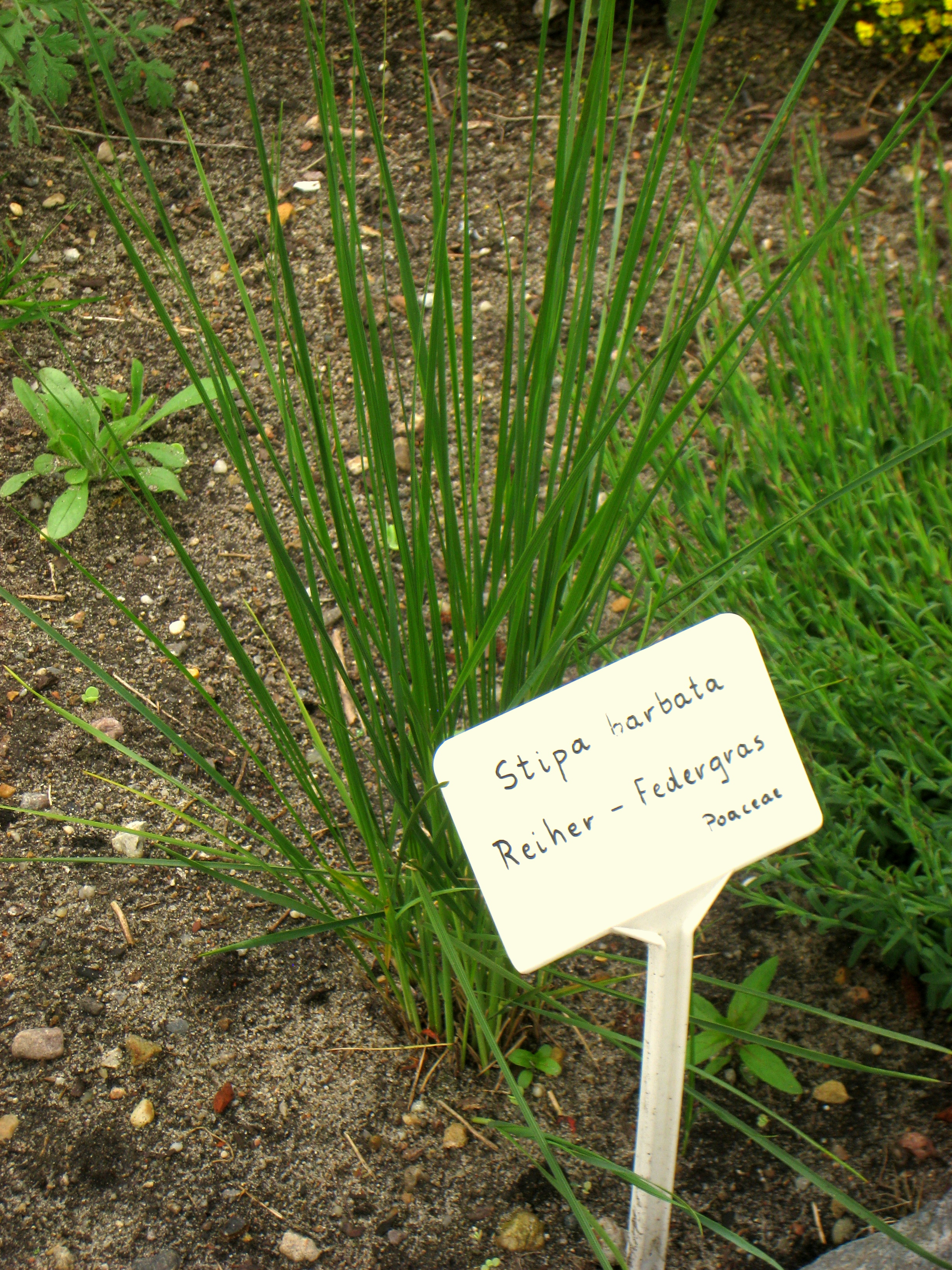

Scientific classification
- Kingdom: Plantae
- Clade: Tracheophytes
- Clade: Angiosperms
- Clade: Monocots
- Clade: Commelinids
- Order: Poales
- Family: Poaceae
- Subfamily: Pooideae
- Genus: Stipa
- Species: S. barbata

Binomial name
- Stipa barbata Desf.

Synonyms
- Stipa alba F.M.Vázquez & S.Ramos; Stipa barbata var. brevipila Coss. & Durieu; Stipa barbata subsp. brevipila (Coss. & Durieu) F.M.Vázquez & Devesa; Stipa barbata var. hispanica Trin. & Rupr.; Stipa barbata var. pabotii Mouterde; Stipa calatajeronensis Tineo ex Arcang.; Stipa intermedia Schtegl. ex Roshev.; Stipa paleacea Vahl; Stipa pennatiformis Fig. & De Not.; Stipa plumosa Pourr. ex Willk. & Lange

= Stipa barbata =

Species of grass

Stipa barbata, commonly known as the bearded feather grass or silver feather grass, is a species of perennial grass native to southern Europe, North Africa, and the Levant in the Mediterranean Basin, and temperate Asia. It is valued for its elegant, feathery awns that create a shimmering effect in the wind. The plant typically grows to 60–90 cm in height and thrives in well-drained soils in full sun, making it popular for borders, gravel gardens, and naturalistic planting schemes.

== Description ==
=== Culms and leaves ===
Stipa barbata is a perennial, tufted bunchgrass forming loose clumps 30–76 cm tall. Culms are erect, cylindrical, glabrous, with hollow internodes. Basal leaves have glabrous or scabrid sheaths, sometimes with short marginal cilia, and ligules 0.4–3.8 mm long; blades are 170–235 mm × 0.4–0.8 mm, rolled, acute, glabrous or scabrid beneath, and densely scabrid above. Cauline leaves (2–3 per culm) are similar but shorter, with ligules 2.5–10 mm and blades 35–62 mm long; the uppermost leaf may partially enclose the panicle.

=== Inflorescence and spikelets ===
The inflorescence is a narrow, elongated panicle 17–45 cm long, lax and diffuse, with glabrous rachis and 2–3 branches per whorl bearing numerous spikelets. Glumes are subequal, narrowly lanceolate, 5‑nerved, hyaline, often green‑ or purple‑tinged; the lower glume 34–38 mm with an awn 10–17 mm, the upper 31–34 mm with an awn 5–17 mm.

=== Lemma and awn ===
Lemmas are 9–13 mm, fusiform, 5‑nerved, with appressed hairs forming narrow bands, glabrous above but pubescent below the awn articulation. The awn is conspicuously long, 120–190 mm, geniculate or bigeniculate, twisted at the base, plumose throughout, with hairs 0.7–2.2 mm increasing in length toward the seta. The callus is 2–2.9 mm, narrow, acute, densely hairy, with a circular basal scar.

=== Reproductive structures ===
Paleas are 8–10 mm, lanceolate and glabrous; lodicules 0.9–1.9 mm, hyaline and lanceolate; anthers 3–7 mm, yellow; ovary with 2–3 plumose styles; caryopsis fusiform, 5.7–8.3 mm long. Chromosome number: 2n = 44.

=== Diagnostic traits ===
The species is well characterized by its plumose awn along the entire length, producing a silvery, shimmering effect in the wind. It differs readily from Stipa iberica, which has a glabrous awn column and longer plumose hairs on the seta. Adapted to dry, open habitats, S. barbata has rigid, narrow leaves that reduce water loss, is semi‑evergreen, and produces flowering culms in spring to early summer.

== Taxonomy ==
=== Original Description ===
The species was first described by René Louiche Desfontaines in Flora Atlantica (1798).

Stipa with rigid leaves, striated on one side; panicle loose and elongated; awns very long, bearded from base to apex. It differs from Stipa plumosa L. by its rigid, glaucous, somewhat flattened leaves, striated on one side, broader, with serrated margins; and by its very long awn, densely hairy throughout from base to tip. Native to uncultivated hills in the vicinity of Mascara and Tlemcen (northwestern Algeria).

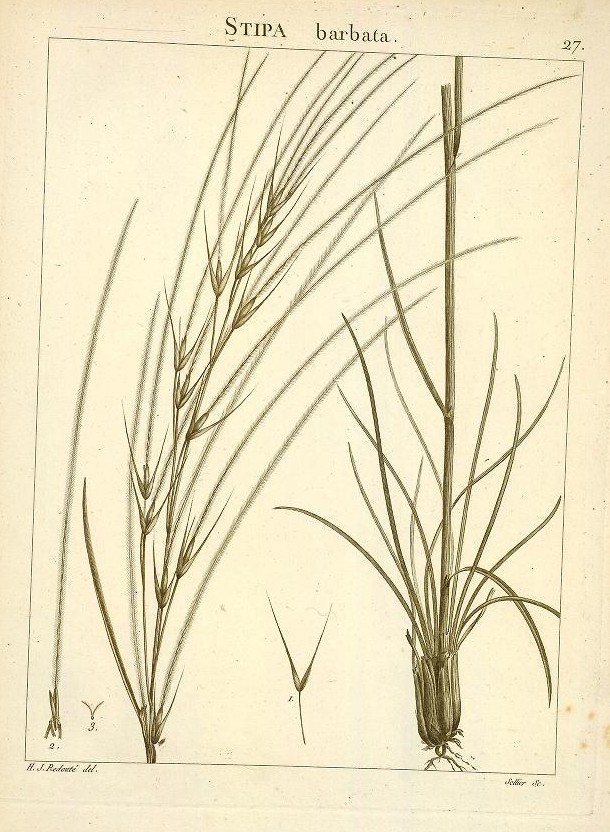
Illustration of Stipa barbata from Flora Atlantica (1798).

=== Taxonomic history ===
==== 18th century: Original description ====
Stipa barbata was first described by Desfontaines in Flora Atlantica (1798). This protologue established the species concept that later authors sought to refine and compare with related taxa.

==== 19th century: Early segregates and Mediterranean varieties ====
In Species Graminum Stipaceorum (1842), Trinius and Ruprecht described var. hispanica, based on specimens from central Spain collected by Boissier. They distinguished it by differences in floret length, hair arrangement, and awn morphology.

In Memorie della Reale Accademia delle Scienze di Torino (1852), Figari and De Notaris described Stipa pennatiformis from Sinai, intermediate between S. pennata and S. barbata.

Cosson and Durieu (1856) provided a detailed account of S. barbata in Algeria, reducing Stipa szovitsiana to synonymy and describing var. brevipila with shorter, appressed hairs on the awns.

In Prodromus Florae Hispanicae (1861), Willkomm and Lange reduced Stipa plumosa Pourr. ex Willk. & Lange to synonymy under S. barbata, reflecting efforts to reconcile Iberian specimens with Desfontaines’ North African protologue.

Arcangeli (1882) briefly segregated Sicilian material as Stipa calatajeronensis Tineo ex Arcang., later regarded as a synonym of S. barbata.

==== 20th century: Eastern forms and Russian treatments ====
Roman Roshevitz (1916) cited Stipa intermedia Schtegl. ex Roshev. in synonymy under S. barbata in Flora Asiae Rossicae.

In Nouvelle Flore du Liban et de la Syrie (1966), Mouterde recognized an eastern form as subsp. damascena (comb. nov.), encompassing Boissier’s S. damascena and Handel‑Mazzetti’s S. assyriaca. He also described var. paboti from Syria. Later authors generally reduced these names to synonymy under S. barbata, though Mouterde’s treatment highlighted uncertainty over whether eastern populations represent a subspecies or distinct species.

==== Late 20th century: Subspecies concepts ====
In 1997, Vázquez & Devesa elevated var. brevipila to subspecies rank as S. barbata subsp. brevipila (stat. nov.). Modern treatments (POWO, Euro+Med, WFO) regard this name as a synonym of S. barbata.

==== 21st century: New segregates ====
In 2007, Vázquez and Ramos described Stipa alba as a new species from southern Tunisia, noting its close affinity to S. barbata but distinguishing it by longer awns, shorter lemmas, and pubescent leaf blades. Stipa alba is currently regarded a synonym of S. barbata.

=== Synonymy ===
The following names have been applied to Stipa barbata in various taxonomic treatments:

Name	Author	Year	Notes
Stipa alba	F.M.Vázquez & S.Ramos	2007	Recognized synonym
Stipa barbata var. brevipila	Coss. & Durieu	1855	Variety described in North African floras
Stipa barbata subsp. brevipila	(Coss. & Durieu) F.M.Vázquez & Devesa	1997	Subspecies treatment in Iberian floras
Stipa barbata var. dasyphylla	Roshev.	1916	Published in Flora Aziatskoi Rossii 1(12): 139. Listed in Tropicos; not accepted by Kew POWO, IPNI, or WFO. Possibly synonymised or misapplied; epithet “dasyphylla” now associated with Stipa dasyphylla as an accepted species.
Stipa barbata var. hispanica	Trin. & Rupr.	1842	Variety described from Spain
Stipa barbata var. incana	Roshev.	1916	Listed in Tropicos; not accepted by Kew POWO, IPNI, or WFO. Historical name with uncertain current status.
Stipa barbata var. normalis	Kuntze	1887	Published in Trudy Imperatorskago S.-Peterburgskago Botaničeskago Sada 10: 254 (1887), type locality Baku (Caucasus). Validly published, but not accepted as a distinct variety; treated as a synonym of S. barbata Desf. in modern taxonomy.
Stipa barbata var. pabotii	Mouterde	1966	Variety described from the Levant
Stipa calatajeronensis	Tineo ex Arcang.	1882	Regional synonym
Stipa intermedia	Schtegl. ex Roshev.	1916	Published pro syn. in B.A. Fedchenko, Flora Asiatica Rossica
Stipa paleacea	Vahl	1791	nom. illeg.; illegitimate name published in Symbolae Botanicae
Stipa pennatiformis	Fig. & De Not.	1852	Synonym in Italian floras
Stipa plumosa	Pourr. ex Willk. & Lange	1861	Published pro syn. in Prodromus Florae Hispanicae

=== Type specimens ===
- Holotype: Collected by René Louiche Desfontaines in Algeria; preserved at P (Muséum national d’Histoire naturelle, Paris).
- Isotype: Duplicate specimen from the same collection, deposited at MPU (Université de Montpellier, Institut de Botanique), accession number MPU024692.

=== Taxonomy Notes ===
Several specimens in the Conservatoire et Jardin botaniques de Genève (CJBG) are annotated as "type" of Stipa barbata:

- Schimper, G. W. (1835), Egypt. CJBG-G-BOIS G00150083 (Boissier’s Flora Orientalis collection).
- Boissier, P. E., Syrian Arab Republic. CJBG-G G00072171.
- Boissier, P. E., Syrian Arab Republic. CJBG-G G00090584.

These represent later material associated with the species but are not part of the original protologue by Desfontaines.

== Distribution and habitat ==
Stipa barbata is native to the Mediterranean Basin and adjacent regions of western Asia, with a range extending from the Iberian Peninsula and North Africa eastward through the Levant, the Caucasus, and into parts of Central Asia and Iran. It inhabits semi‑arid grasslands, rocky slopes, and montane steppe environments, often forming communities with other drought‑adapted grasses.

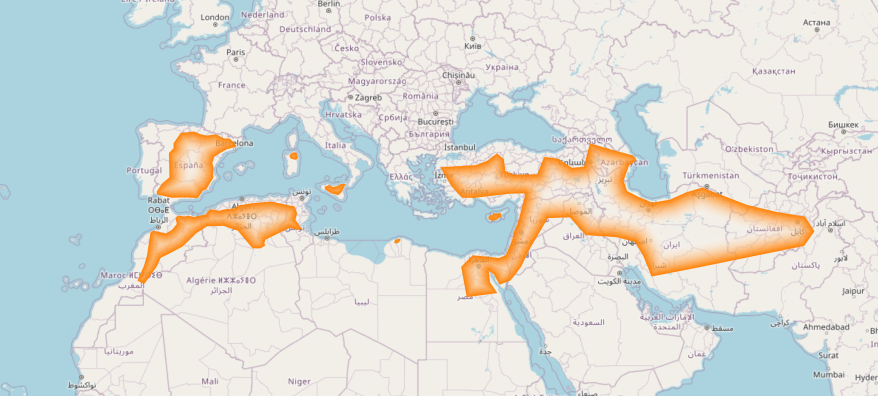
Distribution range of Stipa barbata

=== Algeria ===
Algeria represents the type region for Stipa barbata, with the original description based on material collected near Mascara and Tlemcen, specifically “au bord du Chott‑el‑Chergui à Sidi‑Khalifa.” The species is widespread across the country, occurring both along the Mediterranean coast and throughout the interior high plains. Records document its presence in the eastern provinces (Guelma, Constantine, Sétif–Batna), the central uplands (Lambèse, Djebel Tougour, Titteri), and the western regions (Tiaret, Oran, Mascara, Saïda, Tlemcen).

=== Iberian Peninsula and Sicily ===
Beyond Algeria, the species is frequent in the lower regions of central and southern provinces of Spain, particularly in Castilla la Nueva (Madrid, Valdemoro, Aranjuez) and in the historic Kingdom of Murcia (Chinchilla, Albacete). Collections from these areas were made in July. The variety S. barbata var. hispanica was described from specimens gathered in Castilla la Nueva, reflecting the species variability across Iberian grasslands. It has also been recorded on the gypsum hills of Caltagirone in Sicily, where Todaro described related material under the name Stipa calatajeronensis.

=== Maghreb subspecies ===
Distinct subspecific forms occur in northwest Africa, where specimens of S. barbata subsp. breviseta were documented in Algeria (Chott‑el‑Chergui) and Morocco (Middle Atlas localities such as Ksâr‑es‑Souk, Timhadit, and Itzer). The subspecies is centered in steppe and montane habitats of the Maghreb. (Note: The Maghreb (Arabic: المغرب, al‑Maghrib, "west") refers to the region of northwest Africa comprising Morocco, Algeria, Tunisia, Libya, Mauritania, and Western Sahara.)

=== Tunisia ===
Further south in Tunisia, Stipa alba, now considered a synonym of S. barbata, was described from the type locality near Tatouïne in the Beni M’Hira region. Additional records place it in Gabès and other parts of southern Tunisia, indicating a distribution confined to the arid and semi‑arid zones of the Maghreb.

=== Levant and Syria ===
In the eastern Mediterranean, populations of S. barbata (treated by Mouterde as subsp. damascena and var. paboti) occur in mountain pastures and steppe habitats. It is recorded in numerous localities including Jabal Kneissé, Jabal Barouk, Damascus, Palmyra, Qaryatein, and Lake Jabboul, typically in subarid or arid regions. Mouterde considered these eastern populations distinct from the western Mediterranean form, which is confined to Spain, Italy, Sicily, and North Africa.

=== Eastern range ===
Extending beyond the Mediterranean, S. barbata is also reported from the Caucasus, Arabia Petraea (southern Jordan, Sinai Peninsula, northwestern Saudi Arabia), Asia Minor near Aintab, and southern Iran.

=== Habitat and flowering ===
Across its range, S. barbata typically inhabits uncultivated clayey, calcareous, or sandy soils, and is often associated with Stipa tenacissima forming pasture‑like communities. It thrives in steppe, montane, and semi‑arid environments from the Maghreb to the Levant and eastern Mediterranean. Flowering generally occurs in spring to early summer (March–July), varying slightly by region: April–May in Tunisia, March–June in the Levant, and July in central Spain.

== Ecology ==
S. barbata is a key forage bunchgrass found in the cold, arid winter regions of Syria, the Middle East, and North Africa, where annual rainfall ranges from 100 to 250 mm. Continuous overgrazing has led to the disappearance of S. barbata from many rangeland habitats. It is believed that the species was once a dominant grass in the Syrian arid zone.

In Iraq, S. barbata distribution has been documented in the mountain forest and alpine vegetation zones described by Guest & Al‑Rawi in the Flora of Iraq and later refined by Al‑Dulaimi.

In the hilly northern regions bordering Syria, Turkey, and Iran, S. barbata occurs in thorn‑cushion and forest zones between 500–3000 m elevation, where annual precipitation ranges from 700–1400 mm, partly as snow. It grows alongside associated species such as Stipa capensis, S. bromoides, S. hohenackeana, and S. lagascae, within communities dominated by perennial herbs and shrubs of Compositae, Cruciferous, and Poaceae families. In the alpine zone (2750–3730 m), S. barbata is found in open scrublands and disturbed pine woods (Pinus brutia var. eldarica), where it associates with other steppe grasses and low‑thorned shrubs.

== Conservation ==
Stipa barbata has not yet been assessed for the IUCN Red List of Threatened Species. Regional floras describe the species as widespread in southern Europe, North Africa, and the Levant, occurring in steppe and semi‑arid habitats on calcareous and gypsum soils. It is generally considered locally common and not under immediate threat.

== Cultivation and Uses ==
Stipa barbata is valued as an ornamental grass in Mediterranean-style and xeriscape gardens (Note: Xeriscaping is a landscaping approach that reduces or eliminates the need for supplemental irrigation by using drought-tolerant plants, efficient soil management, and water-conserving design principles.) due to its elegant, feathery awns that create a distinctive, shimmering effect in the wind. It is typically grown in well-drained soils with full sun exposure and is highly tolerant of drought once established, making it suitable for low-maintenance landscapes in arid and semi-arid regions.

Propagation is usually by seed, which should be sown in spring in a light, sandy substrate. The species prefers calcareous soils and does not tolerate waterlogging. In garden settings, it is often combined with other drought-tolerant perennials and grasses to create naturalistic plantings.
