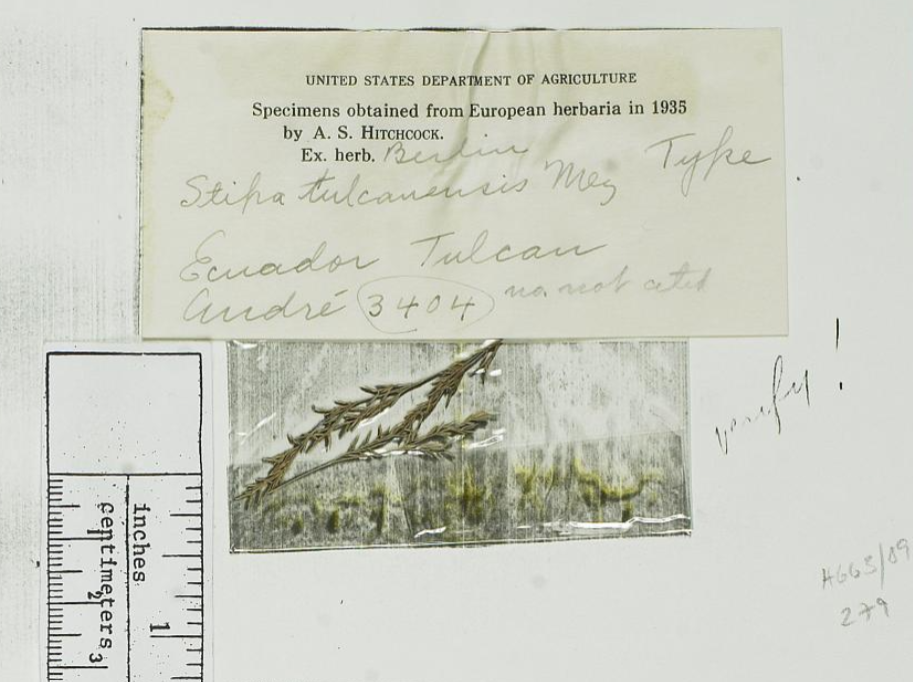
- Specimen image of Stipa tulcanensis Mez (type fragment, US 3168164); collected by Édouard François André in 1921

Conservation status
- Critically Endangered (IUCN 3.1)

Scientific classification
- Kingdom: Plantae
- Clade: Tracheophytes
- Clade: Angiosperms
- Clade: Monocots
- Clade: Commelinids
- Order: Poales
- Family: Poaceae
- Subfamily: Pooideae
- Genus: Stipa
- Species: S. tulcanensis

Binomial name
- Stipa tulcanensis Mez

= Stipa tulcanensis =

Species of grass

Stipa tulcanensis is a species of grass in the family Poaceae. It is found only in Ecuador.

== Taxonomy ==
=== Original description ===
Stipa tulcanensis Mez was first described in Repertorium specierum novarum regni vegetabilis in 1921.

Perennial, about half a meter tall or slightly more, very slender. Leaves with sheaths distinctly shorter than the internodes of the culm; ligules very short, rounded; blades extremely narrow-linear, apparently flat, hairy at the throat, otherwise glabrous and smooth. Culms minutely roughened. Inflorescence somewhat many-flowered, rather dense, 3–4 times pinnately paniculate, fusiform; branches erect, up to 90 mm long, repeatedly divided from the base, in the lower part prolongedly sterile. All lateral spikelets much longer than the pedicels, which are densely and almost pilosely rough, the spikelets themselves glabrous. Glumes equal, about 7 mm long, linear-elliptic, nearly blunt at the apex, 3-nerved. Palea pale-colored, toward the base sparsely and erectly hairy, otherwise glabrous, symmetrical, produced at the base into a sharp claw about 0.2 mm long, briefly hairy; apex furnished with a crown whose margin is long but sparsely ciliate, and ending in an awn about 7 mm long, twisted only at the very base, glabrous. — Ecuador, Tulcán (André).

=== Taxonomic status ===
The name S. tulcanensis Mez was validly published in 1921. However, it is currently listed as unplaced in modern taxonomic databases, meaning that its precise position within the genus Stipa or related taxa has not been resolved. An “unplaced” name indicates that while the protologue meets the requirements of the International Code of Nomenclature, subsequent taxonomic work has not confirmed its accepted placement, synonymy, or reassignment to another genus.

=== Type specimen ===
The holotype of Stipa tulcanensis Mez is deposited at the Berlin Herbarium (B), as recorded in the Tropicos database. Much of the Berlin Herbarium was destroyed during World War II bombing raids in 1943, resulting in the loss of numerous type specimens. However, a fragment derived from the Berlin type material is held at the United States National Herbarium (US, specimen number 3168164).

== Conservation ==
This species is currently assessed as Critically Endangered (CR) according to the IUCN Red List criteria, specifically under criterion B1 ab(iii), which highlights its extremely limited geographic range, fragmentation, and ongoing decline in habitat quality. There is significant concern that S. tulcanensis may already be extinct, as indicated by the notation EX? in the assessment. Further concerns include:

- It is a terrestrial herbaceous plant found at high elevations between 3000 and 3500 meters.
- Its natural habitat remains unknown due to the scarcity of records.
- The species is known solely from the type specimen collected by the botanist Édouard André, likely in the late 1870s.
- No recent specimens have been documented, and it is absent from Ecuadorian herbarium collections.
