= Stipa ucrainica =

Scientific classification
- Kingdom: Plantae
- Clade: Tracheophytes
- Clade: Angiosperms
- Clade: Monocots
- Clade: Commelinids
- Order: Poales
- Family: Poaceae
- Subfamily: Pooideae
- Genus: Stipa
- Species: S. ucrainica

Binomial name
- Stipa ucrainica P.A.Smirn.

Synonyms
- Stipa krascheninnikowii Roshev.; Stipa zalesskii subsp. ucrainica (P.A.Smirn.) Tzvelev

Species of plant

Stipa ucrainica is a species of flowering plant in the grass family Poaceae, native from North Macedonia to Kazakhstan and the Caucasus. It was first described in 1926.

== Taxonomy ==
=== Original Description ===
The following account is translated from the original Latin protologue by Paul Smirnov (1926):

Plants pale green or somewhat glaucous. Tufts dense, up to 15 cm in basal diameter, usually abundantly leafy, partly covered by old sheaths that are pale brown. Culms 3‑noded, 30–60 cm tall, numerous, more rarely few, as usual overtopping the leaves. Sheaths longer than the internodes, typically uncolored, appressed to the culm, all glabrous, smooth or in the upper part ± scabrous. Leaf blades capillary or bristle‑like, 0.4–0.6 mm in diameter, apex ± gradually acuminate but not attenuated into a very fine mucro; externally scabrous with prickles and densely covered with subappressed aculeiform and setuliform hairs (0.07–0.26 mm long), more rarely only scabrous (especially in autumnal specimens), very rough, without spreading soft hairs; inner surface with short appressed hairs. Ligule of innovation leaves 1–3 mm long, acuminate or tridentate; ligule of culm leaves 2–4 mm long. Glumes nearly equal, 45–65 mm long. Lower lemma 17–21 mm long, with seven lines of hairs, of which two marginal lines 2–4 mm do not reach the apex, more rarely continued to the awn. Awn entire, up to 400 mm long. Flowers mostly chasmogamous.

Very close to Stipa rubens, from which it differs by its dense, abundantly leafy tufts, capillary leaves, glabrous uncolored sheaths, and hair lines on the lemma usually not reaching the awn. From S. dasyphylla it differs by narrower leaves and absence of spreading pubescence; from S. stenophylla (= S. tirsa) it is distinguished by the rather long ligule of the innovation leaves.

Habitat: In the southern provinces of Ukraine and also in the Don region of European Russia, where it grows abundantly in the steppes of the southern black‑earth zone and chestnut soils; also in the steppe regions of the Taurian peninsula and northern Caucasus. In Turkestan apparently rare or very rare; no specimens seen from Siberia.

== Type specimens ==
The species Stipa ucrainica was described by P.A. Smirnov (1926), based on material collected by B. Alehin in Ukraine. The protologue cites the type locality as Ekaterinoslav province, Alexandrovsk district, near Mirgorodovka, on the southern steppe slope of the valley “Prunosae.”

- Holotype: Moscow State University Herbarium (MW), accession MW0591232.
- Isotypes: MW0591233–MW0591236 (Moscow University Herbarium).
- Collector: B. Alehin.
- Repository: MW (Moscow University Herbarium).

A later name, Stipa krascheninnikowii Roshev. (1928), is considered a heterotypic synonym of S. ucrainica. Its type specimen is deposited at the Harvard University Herbaria (GH), barcode GH00024487, collected in Kazakhstan by M.M. Ilyin & M.N. Abramchik.
