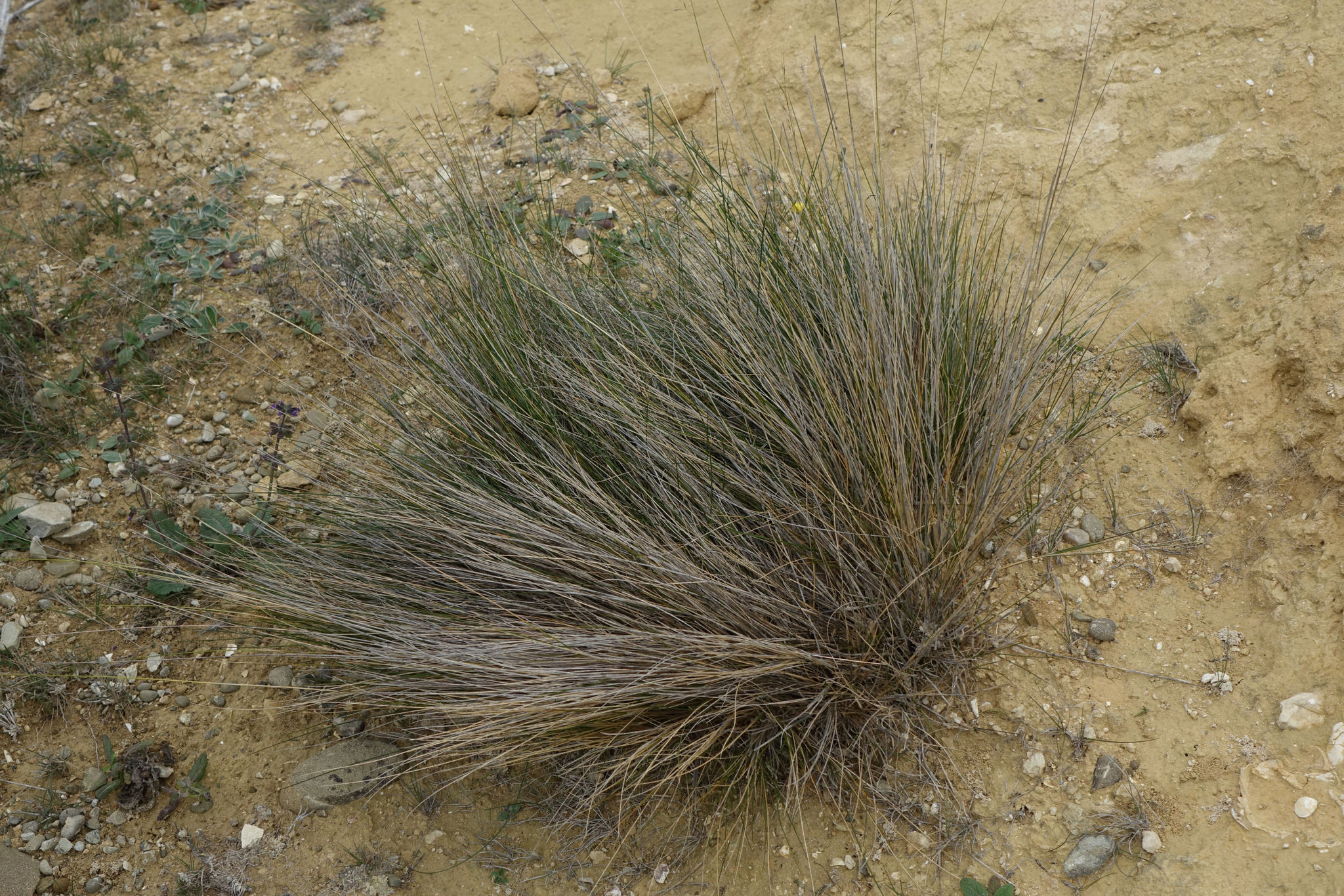

Conservation status
- Nationally Vulnerable (NZ TCS)

Scientific classification
- Kingdom: Plantae
- Clade: Tracheophytes
- Clade: Angiosperms
- Clade: Monocots
- Clade: Commelinids
- Order: Poales
- Family: Poaceae
- Subfamily: Pooideae
- Genus: Stipa
- Species: S. petriei

Binomial name
- Stipa petriei Buchanan

Synonyms
- Achnatherum petriei (Buchanan) S.W.L.Jacobs & J.Everett

= Stipa petriei =

Species of plant

Stipa petriei, synonym Achnatherum petriei, is a threatened New Zealand species of true grass in the tribe Poeae.

== Description ==
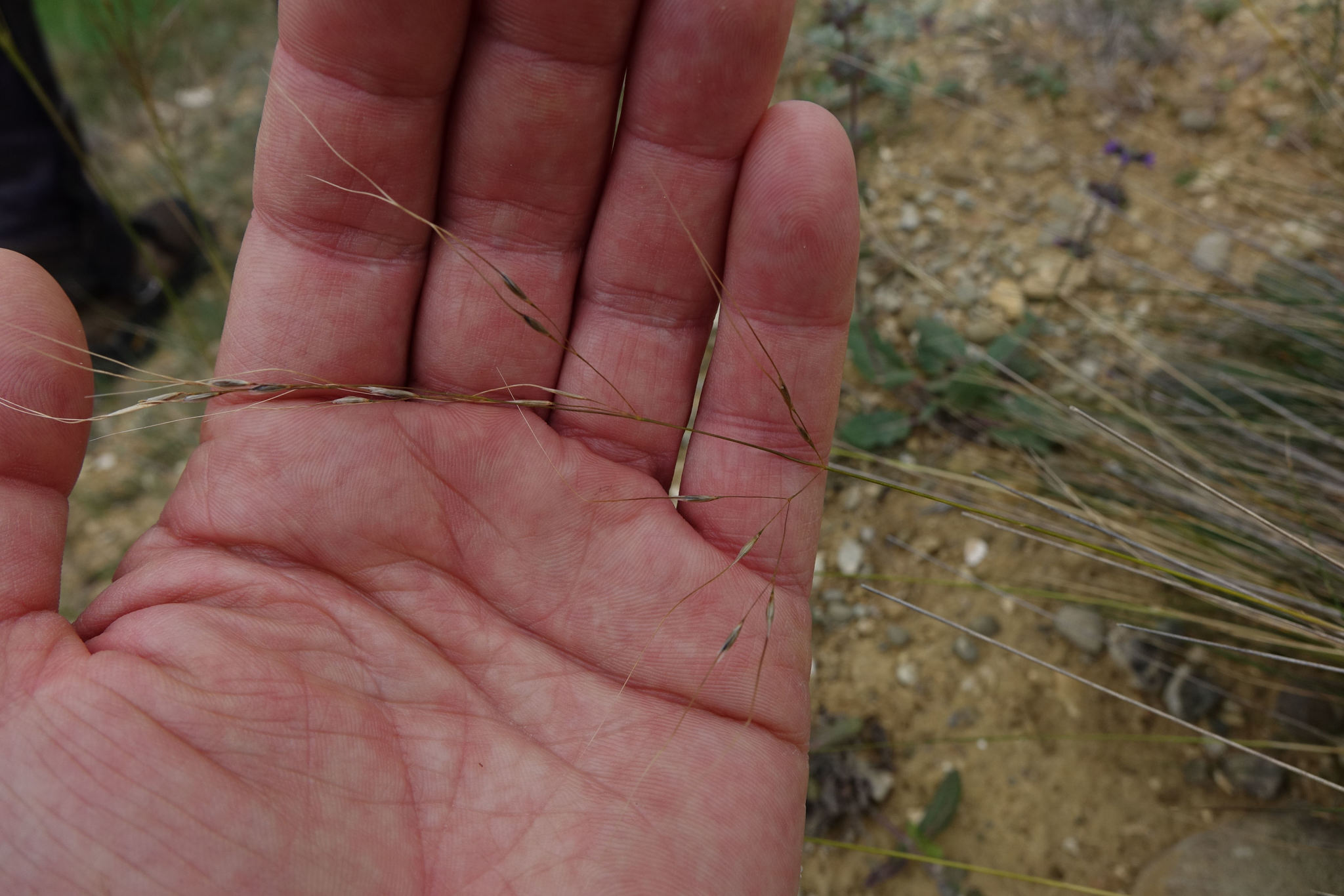
Inflorescence

Stipa petriei is an erect, wiry grass with long, thin, single-floret spikelets born on sparse inflorescences. Distinguished from other species by the contiguous lemma margins, persistent awns, and long-haired paleas. Like Amelichloa caudata, Stipa petriei has been placed in the genus Achnatherum. From this species, S. petriei can be distinguished by its extravaginal branching, hairy rather than prickled leaf-blades, and by its hairy lemmas. However, A. caudata is only naturalised in eastern Canterbury in New Zealand, away from the restricted distribution of S. petriei.

== Taxonomy ==
Stipa petriei was described by John Buchanan in 1880. In 1996, recognising that Stipa was too diverse to be treated as one genus, the genus Achnatherum was reinstated, and S. petriei moved into it. As of August 2025, Plants of the World Online recognizes Achnatherum, but does not place Stipa petriei in this genus.

== Distribution ==
Stipa petriei is endemic to South Canterbury and Central Otago in New Zealand. It is found up to 1000 metres above sea level, largely on dry stony ground, as well as limestone and schit outcrops.

== Threats ==
Under the synonym Achnatherum petriei, Stipa petriei is listed as Threatened – Nationally Vulnerable. It is a naturally sparse species. However, it is likely threatened by weeds, particularly Thymus vulgaris and Sedum acre.
