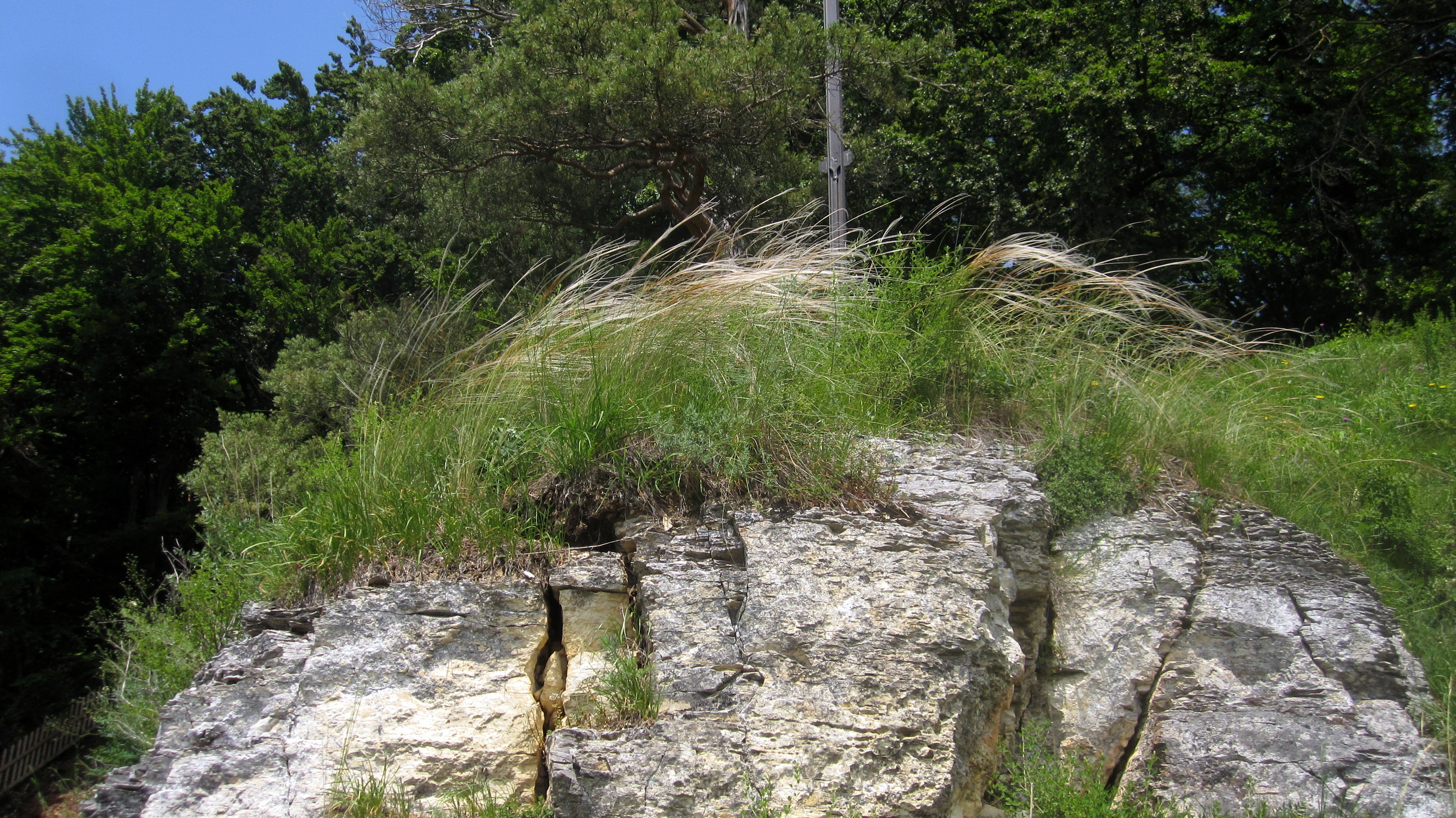
- Stipa bavarica on a rocky outcrop in the Finkenstein nature reserve

Conservation status
- Vulnerable (IUCN 3.1)

Scientific classification
- Kingdom: Plantae
- Clade: Tracheophytes
- Clade: Angiosperms
- Clade: Monocots
- Clade: Commelinids
- Order: Poales
- Family: Poaceae
- Subfamily: Pooideae
- Genus: Stipa
- Species: S. bavarica

Binomial name
- Stipa bavarica Martinovský & H.Scholz
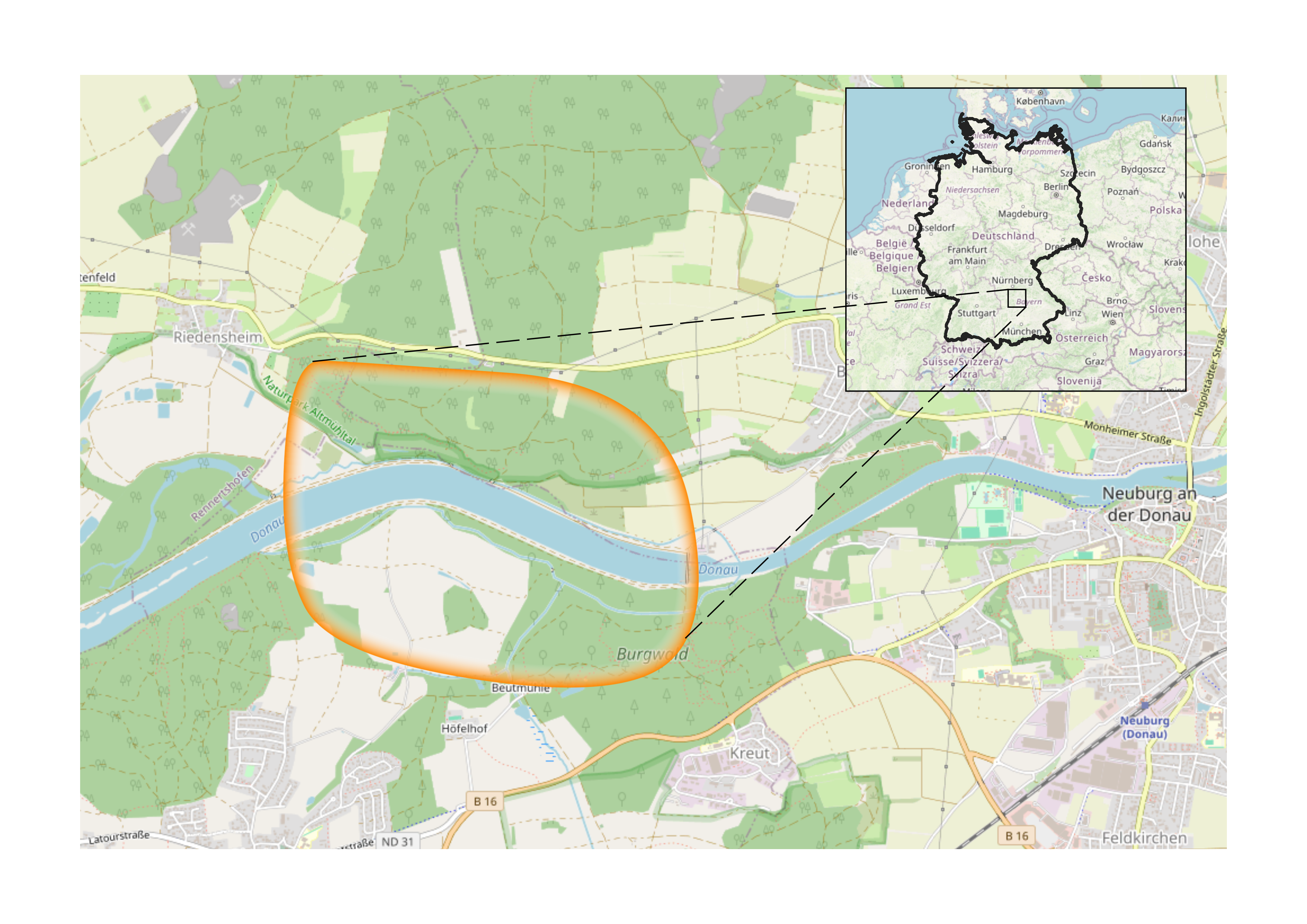
- Native range of Stipa bavarica

Synonyms
- Stipa pulcherrima subsp. bavarica (Martinovský & H.Scholz) Conert

= Stipa bavarica =

SpecIes of grass

Stipa bavarica, commonly known as Bavarian feather grass is a perennial grass species in the family Poaceae, native to southern Germany. The species is restricted to a small area on the Finkenstein Nature Reserve near Neuburg an der Donau in Bavaria.

== Taxonomy ==
Stipa bavarica was first described as a distinct species by Martinovský and H. Scholz in 1968.

In 1992, Conert reclassified it as a subspecies of Stipa pulcherrima. Modern authorities such as Plants of the World Online and GrassBase accept Stipa bavarica as a valid species, though some regional floras continue to treat it as a subspecies.

Recent genetic studies have found no significant genetic differentiation between populations of the closely related Stipa pucherrima and Stipa bavarica populations. Further the taxonomic separation of Stipa bavarica as a distinct species may not be warranted.

== Description ==
Stipa bavarica is a perennial grass that grows in small, tufted clumps and is similar to Stia pulcherrima, but smaller with its stems reach between 30 and 70 cm in height. Leaf sheaths and leaf base as well as underside of the blades densely hairy, leaf otherwise rough. Each leaf has a small, thin membrane (ligule) at the junction with the stem, usually 2–4 mm long, and shorter on the basal shoots.

The leaves are long and thread‑like, folded lengthwise, measuring 35–70 cm in length but only about 1–1.3 mm wide. Their surfaces are ribbed, rough to the touch, and hairy on both sides. The leaf tips are pointed.

Stipa bavarica produces a narrow flowering head (panicle) with only a few spikelets, usually 6–9 in total. The stalk that supports the panicle can be smooth or slightly hairy near the top. The panicle itself is slender and compact, with a hairy central axis. Each spikelet occurs singly and is borne on a small stalk.

== Distribution and habitat ==
Stipa bavarica is restricted to a single site in Bavaria, Germany, with a maximum extent of occurrence of about 137 km^{2}.

Stipa bavarica grows on rock spurs and mountain tops where fine substrate accumulates in crevices and shallow pits. The plant starts flowering in its third year.

== Conservation ==
Stipa bavarica population is very small, with a limited number of individuals which makes the species vulnerable. There are additional pressures on the species including natural succession of its habitat, the risk of collection, and the introduction of other Stipa species. The population is currently considered stable and the species is assessed as Vulnerable under criterion D2 of the IUCN Red List, it is also listed in the highest threat category on both the German national and Bavarian Red Lists. This indicates that the species may be at greater risk than the global assessment suggests.
