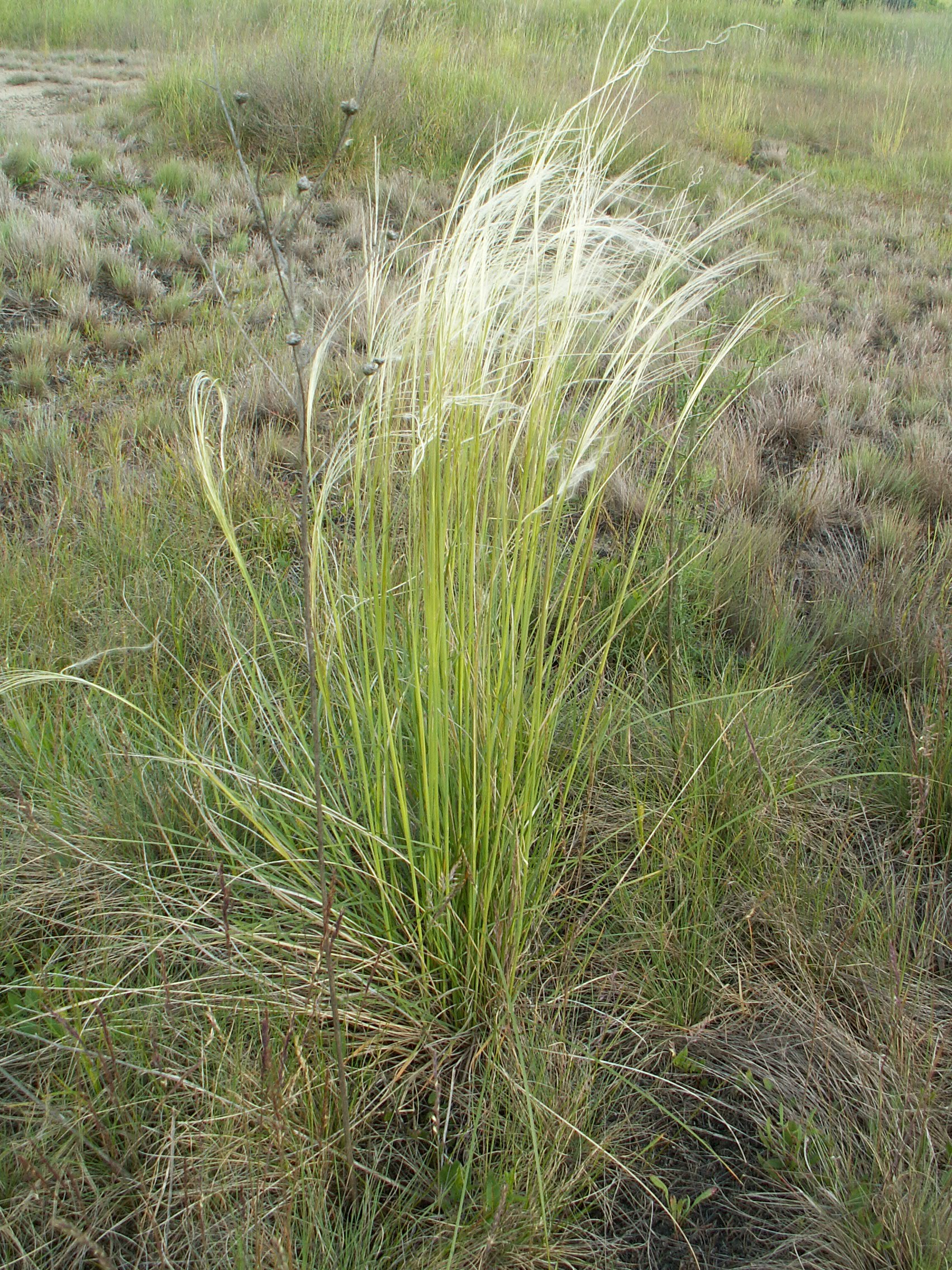

Scientific classification
- Kingdom: Plantae
- Clade: Tracheophytes
- Clade: Angiosperms
- Clade: Monocots
- Clade: Commelinids
- Order: Poales
- Family: Poaceae
- Subfamily: Pooideae
- Genus: Stipa
- Species: S. borysthenica

Binomial name
- Stipa borysthenica Klokov ex Prokudin in Wulf.

= Stipa borysthenica =

Species of plant

Stipa borysthenica is a perennial bunchgrass species in the family Poaceae, native to Europe and Asia.

It is a common species in a wide area of Kazakhstan and southern parts of Russia. In many European countries (e.g. Czech Republic, Slovakia, Poland, Hungary, Ukraine) it is a post-glacial relict and protected endangered plant.

== Description ==
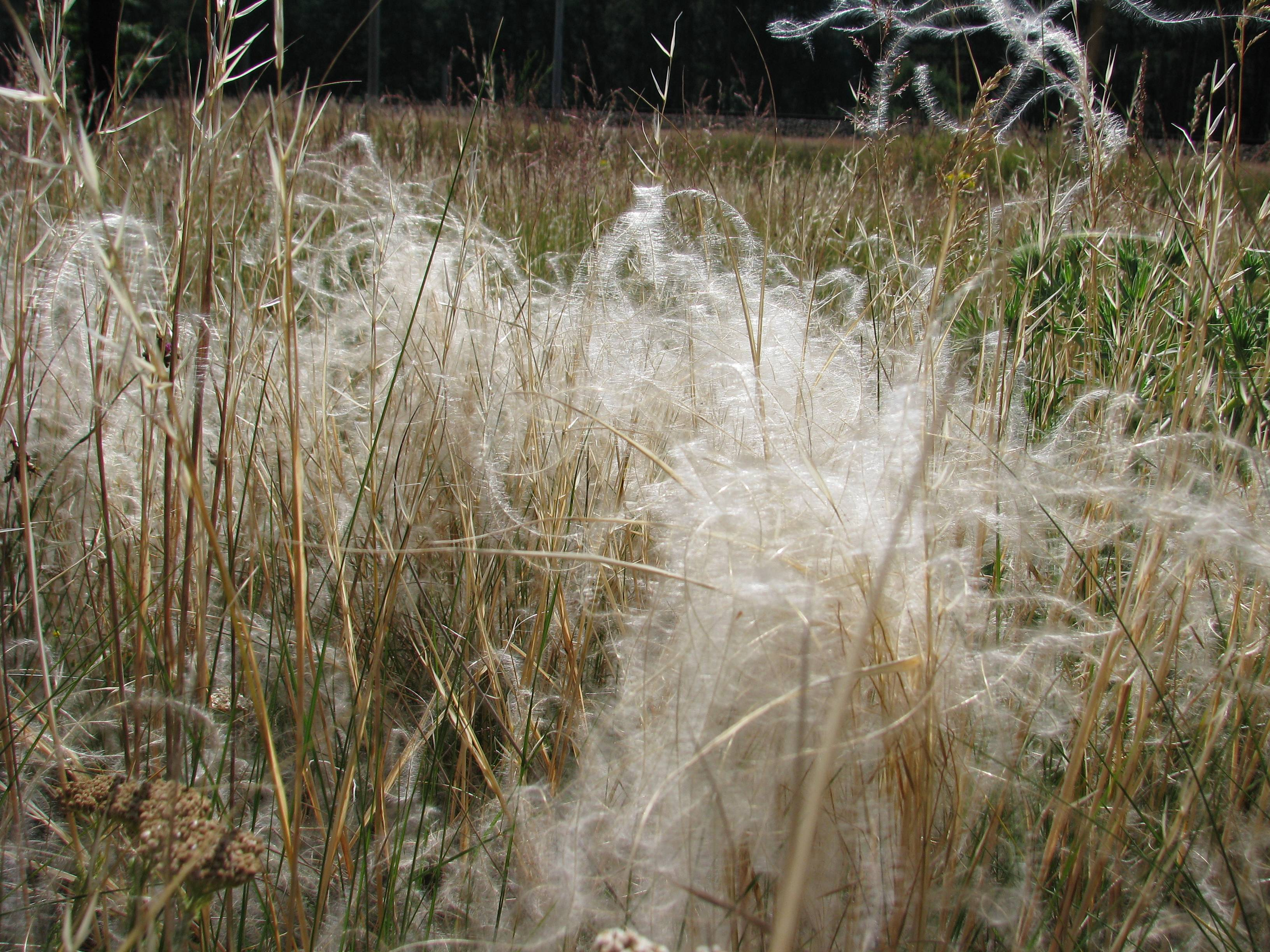
Seeds of Stipa borysthenica

Stipa borysthenica Klokov ex Prokudin is a perennial bunchgrass distinguished from related species by its leaves, which have a shorter and sparser tuft of hairs, or are glabrous at the apex. The sheaths of the upper leaves have a rough texture (scabrid), and the lemma measures 21–22 mm.

== Distribution and habitat ==
The species is native to eastern and east central Europe, including Austria, Bulgaria, the Czech Republic, Germany, Hungary, Iran, Kazakhstan, Ukraine, Yugoslavia, Poland, Romania, and Russia.
