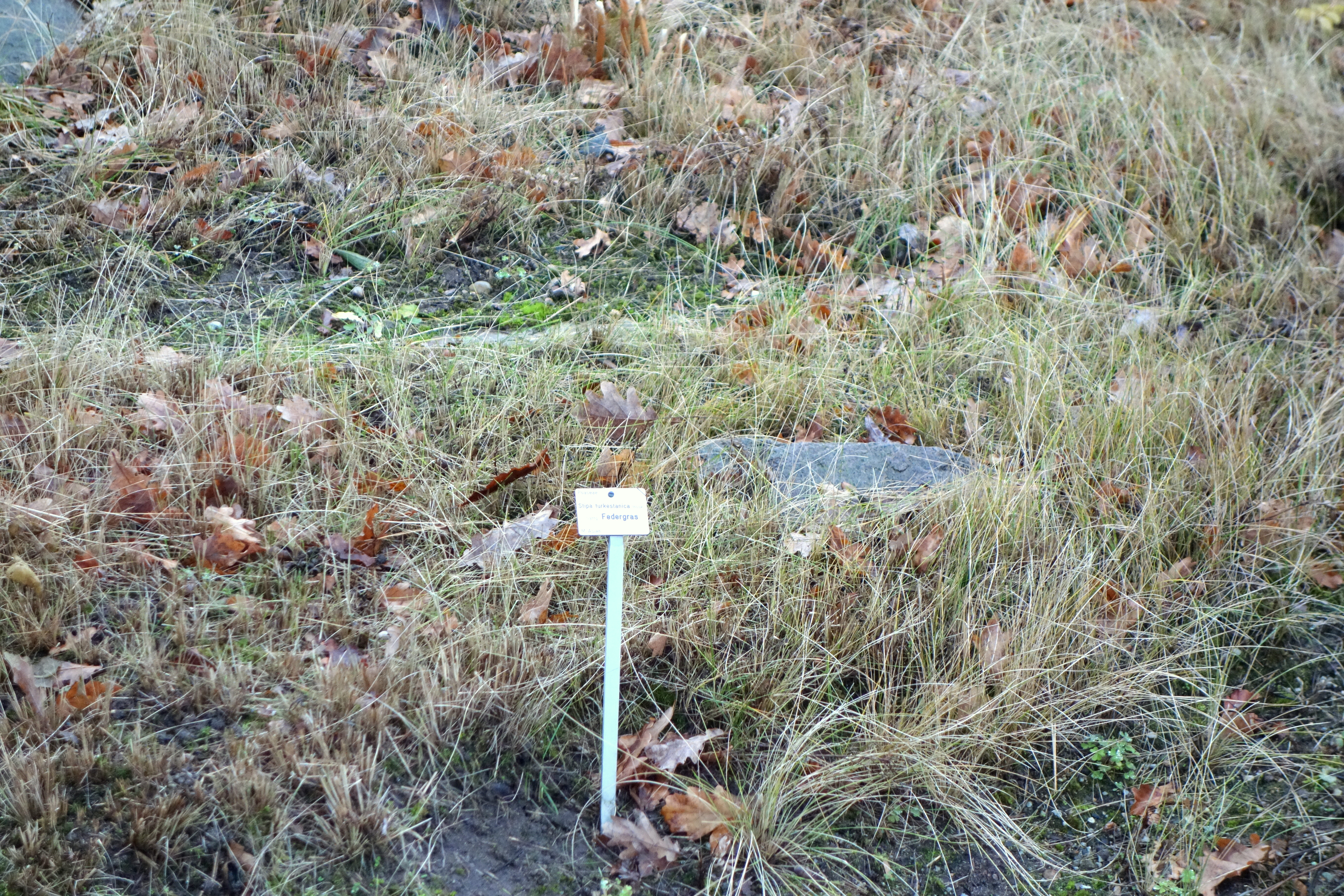

Scientific classification
- Kingdom: Plantae
- Clade: Tracheophytes
- Clade: Angiosperms
- Clade: Monocots
- Clade: Commelinids
- Order: Poales
- Family: Poaceae
- Subfamily: Pooideae
- Genus: Stipa
- Species: S. turkestanica

Binomial name
- Stipa turkestanica Hack.

Synonyms
- Stipa turkestanica var. diyaensis L.Q.Zhao & K.Guo

= Stipa turkestanica =

Species of grass

Stipa turkestanica is a species of grass that grows in India and Central Asia and western Asia. Its culms are 30–70 cm long, and panicles 8–14 cm long, bearing few spikelets.

== Taxonomy ==
=== Original Description ===
The species was first described by Eduard Hackel in 1906.

Perennial. Innovations intravaginal. Culms about 30 cm tall, erect, terete, scabrous, with two nodes; the upper node situated about the middle of the culm; leafy up to the apex. Sheaths shorter than the internodes, terete; the lower ones tight, the uppermost dilated; all scabrous downward; when withered becoming brownish, opaque. Ligules lanceolate, somewhat acute, 2–3 mm long. Blades all setaceously convolute, very acute, rigid; the lower ones equaling or surpassing half the culm; those of the innovations 10–15 cm long, 0.5 mm in diameter; those of the culm shorter; all very scabrous beneath, grayish-green.

Panicle linear, contracted, sheathed at the base or shortly exserted from the sheath, 10–12 cm long; lower branches paired, upper solitary; all short, erect, scabrous; mostly bearing one spikelet, the lowest sometimes two; spikelet pedicels appressed to the rachis, the lower ones slightly longer than the spikelets, the upper ones several times shorter. Spikelets lanceolate, 3 cm long, greenish.

Sterile glumes lanceolate, 12–14 mm long, herbaceous-membranous in the lower part, hyaline-setaceous in the upper, produced into a very slender point; 3-nerved; glabrous or scabrous above along the midnerve. Fertile glume linear-oblong, about 10 mm long; callus pungent, densely bearded with fulvous hairs 2 mm long; otherwise marked with five silky-pilose lines, of which two marginal lines extend to ¾ of the glume, the remaining three to ½; the rest of the back minutely punctulate-scaberulous; apex glabrous; awn exserted, 8–10 cm long; column 2–2.5 cm long, glabrous or scarcely scaberulous, geniculate above the middle, with a distinct geniculation separating it from the seta; seta plumose, three to four times longer than the column, briefly naked at the very tip. Palea equaling the glume, linear-oblong, obtuse, somewhat tubular, 2-nerved, glabrous. Lodicules 2 mm long. Anthers 6 mm long, usually exserted, rarely during anthesis retained within the glume and palea.

Turkestan, Schugnan, Dschidak in the valley of the river Badamdara, 27 July 1904 (B. A. Fedtschenko!).

Very closely related to Stipa pennata L., but at first glance already distinct by its awns, which are two to three times shorter (8–10 cm, whereas in Stipa pennata they are 20–35 cm long). Furthermore, it differs from all by the sheaths being strongly scabrous downward, and from most subspecies of Stipa pennata (except Stipa tirsa) by its very scabrous leaf blades. From Stipa tirsa it is further distinguished by its lanceolate ligule, 2–3 mm long.

=== Type Specimens ===
The type of S. turkestanica Hack. was collected by Boris A. Fedtschenko on 27 July 1904 in the Badam‑dara Valley near Dshidak, Shugnan District, Tajikistan, during the Iter turkestanicum. (Note: The phrase Iter turkestanicum is Latin for "Turkestan expedition" and refers to Fedtschenko’s 1904 botanical journey through Central Asia.) The holotype is preserved in the Vienna herbarium (W, specimen W 1916‑0019184). An isotype fragment from the Vienna material is housed in the U.S. National Herbarium (US‑3168610). Additional isotypes are deposited at the Royal Botanic Gardens, Kew (K000433027) and at the Moscow State University Herbarium (MW0591230, MW0591231).

The following table summarizes the known type specimens of S. turkestanica across major herbaria:

Status	Collector & number	Date	Locality	Herbarium	Accession/notes
Holotype	B. A. Fedtschenko, s.n.	27 Jul 1904	Tajikistan: Shugnan, Dshidak, Badam‑dara Valley	W (Vienna)	W 1916‑0019184; Iter turkestanicum
Isotype	B. A. Fedtschenko, s.n.	27 Jul 1904	Turkestan (same locality as holotype)	US (Smithsonian)	US‑3168610 (fragment ex W)
Isotype	B. A. Fedtschenko, s.n.	1904	Tajikistan	K (Kew)	K000433027
Isotype	B. A. Fedtschenko, s.n.	1904	Tajikistan	MW (Moscow State Univ.)	MW0591230
