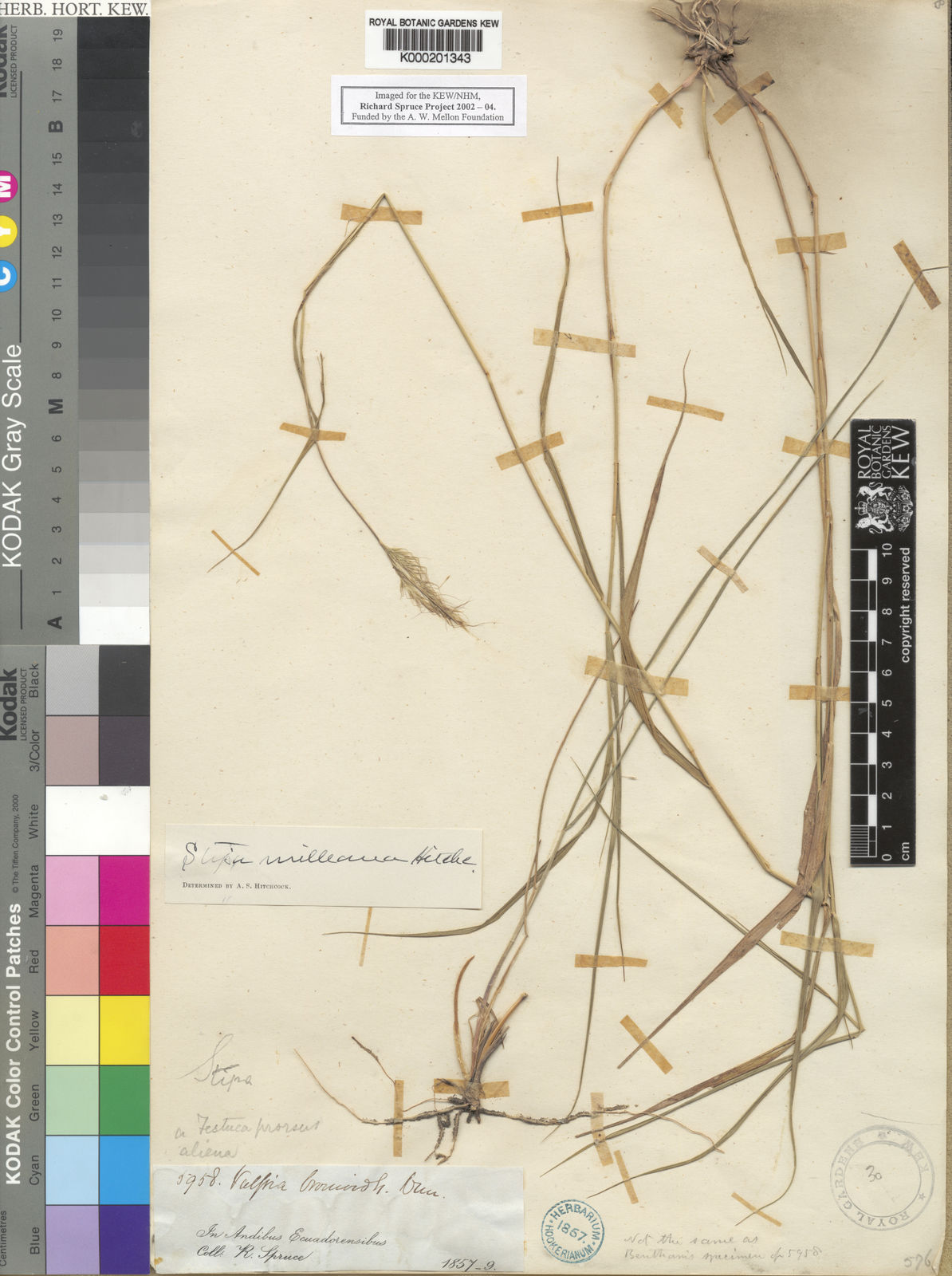
- Herbarium specimen of Stipa milleana

Conservation status
- Least Concern (IUCN 3.1)

Scientific classification
- Kingdom: Plantae
- Clade: Tracheophytes
- Clade: Angiosperms
- Clade: Monocots
- Clade: Commelinids
- Order: Poales
- Family: Poaceae
- Subfamily: Pooideae
- Genus: Stipa
- Species: S. milleana

Binomial name
- Stipa milleana Hitchc.

= Stipa milleana =

Species of grass

Stipa milleana Hitchc. It is found only in Ecuador. It grows 50–100 cm tall with narrow, tapering leaves and produces an open, lance‑shaped panicle of spikelets, each bearing a single floret. The glumes are longer than the florets and end in bristle‑like tips, while the lemma carries a twisted awn.

== Description ==
Stipa milleana grows 50–100 cm tall with upright stems and narrow leaves up to 40 cm long. The leaves are slightly hairy, especially on the upper surface, and taper to fine points. The flowering head is an open, lance‑shaped panicle 20–40 cm long, with short branches that are either pressed close or slightly spreading. Each spikelet is about 6 mm long and contains a single fertile floret. The glumes are longer than the florets and end in bristle‑like tips. The lemma is small and hairy, ending in a twisted awn 10–13 mm long. The flower has two tiny scales (lodicules) that help it open, three anthers, and two stigmas. The fruit is a narrow grain (caryopsis) with a linear scar where it was attached (hilum).

== Distribution and habitat ==
Stipa milleana is native to the Andean Ecuador of western South America. The type specimen was collected on Mount Pichincha near Quito, Ecuador, by L. Mille (no. 256; U.S. National Herbarium no. 1,188,857). Additional collections have been made in the same region, including specimens near Quito (Mille 259, 392; Sodiro, 1893) and from Alausí (Hitchcock 20698, 20727).
