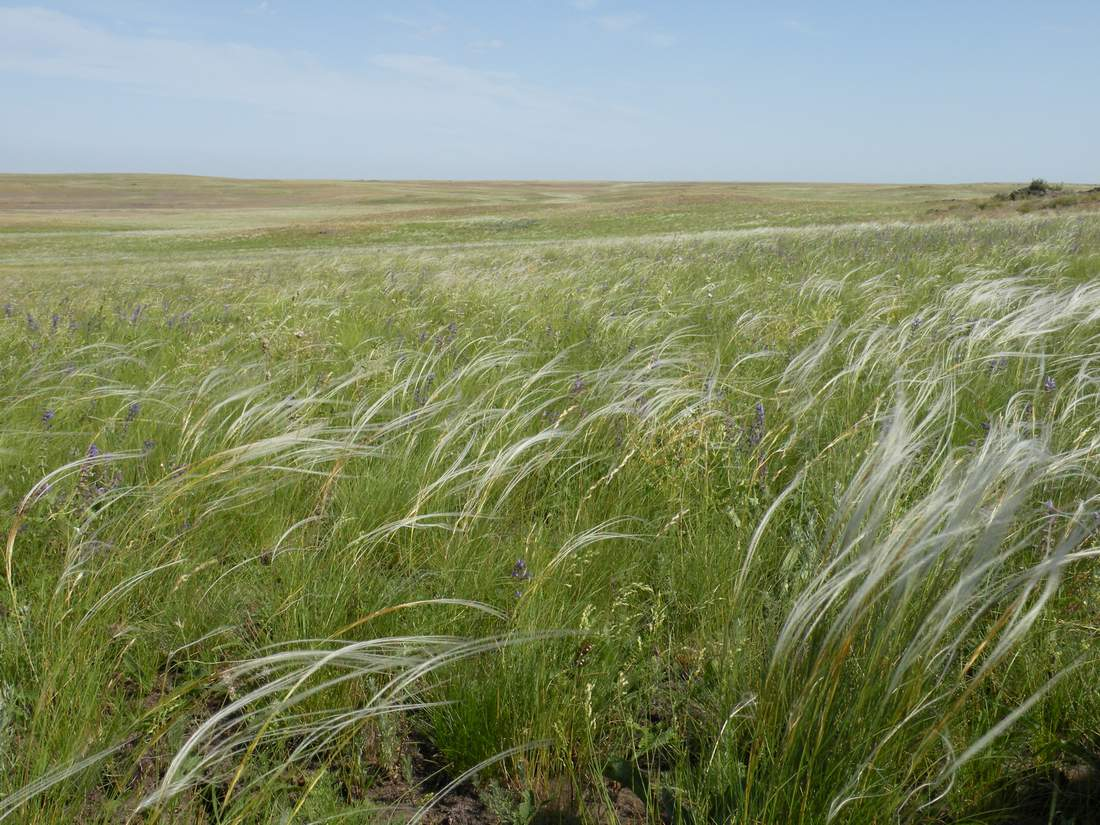

Scientific classification
- Kingdom: Plantae
- Clade: Tracheophytes
- Clade: Angiosperms
- Clade: Monocots
- Clade: Commelinids
- Order: Poales
- Family: Poaceae
- Subfamily: Pooideae
- Genus: Stipa
- Species: S. zalesskii

Binomial name
- Stipa zalesskii Wilensky

Synonyms
- List: Stipa canescens P.A.Smirn. ex Roshev.; Stipa dasyphylla var. glabrata P.A.Smirn.; Stipa dobrogensis Prodan; Stipa glabrata P.A.Smirn.; Stipa iljinii Roshev.; Stipa maeotica Klokov & Osychnyuk; Stipa pennata subsp. zalesskii (Wilensky) Freitag; Stipa rubens P.A.Smirn.; Stipa rubens var. glabrata (P.A.Smirn.) Tzvelev; Stipa rubens subsp. rubentiformis (P.A.Smirn.) F.M.Vázquez & M.Gut.; Stipa rubens var. smirnovii (Martinovský) Tzvelev; Stipa rubentiformis P.A.Smirn.; Stipa smirnovii Martinovský; Stipa turcomanica P.A.Smirn.; Stipa zalesskii subsp. canescens (P.A.Smirn. ex Roshev.) Tzvelev; Stipa zalesskii subsp. glabrata (P.A.Smirn.) F.M.Vázquez & M.Gut.; Stipa zalesskii var. glabrata (P.A.Smirn.) Tzvelev; Stipa zalesskii var. iljinii (Roshev.) Tzvelev; Stipa zalesskii subsp. maeotica (Klokov & Osychnyuk) F.M.Vázquez & M.Gut.; Stipa zalesskii var. maeotica (Klokov & Osychnyuk) Tzvelev; Stipa zalesskii subsp. turcomanica (P.A.Smirn.) Tzvelev; Stipa zalesskii var. turcomanica (P.A.Smirn.) M.Nobis; Stipa zalesskii var. rubens (P.A.Smirn.) Tzvelev

= Stipa zalesskii =

Species of grass from Eurasia

Stipa zalesskii is a grass found in Europe and Asia, from the Czech Republic east to Mongolia and south to Iran. It is an important grass in Eurasian steppe. Its culms are 30–75 cm long and the leaf-blades 20–35 cm long by 0.6–1 mm wide.
