= Stipa leptogluma =

Conservation status
- Data Deficient (IUCN 3.1)

Scientific classification
- Kingdom: Plantae
- Clade: Tracheophytes
- Clade: Angiosperms
- Clade: Monocots
- Clade: Commelinids
- Order: Poales
- Family: Poaceae
- Subfamily: Pooideae
- Genus: Stipa
- Species: S. leptogluma

Binomial name
- Stipa leptogluma Pilg.

Species of grass

Stipa leptogluma Pilg. is a species of grass in the family Poaceae. It is found only in Ecuador.

== Description ==
Stipa leptogluma is a perennial grass with erect culms. The leaf blades are linear, either rolled or somewhat flat, and reach 17–18 cm in length. The inflorescence is a sparse panicle with branches in pairs or threes, which may be loosely branched, raceme‑like, or bear single spikelets; toward the apex of the panicle the branches alternate. Spikelets are one‑flowered. The two sterile glumes are thinly membranous, lanceolate, acuminate, and 7–8 mm long. The fertile lemma is ovate, silky, obscurely five‑nerved, and 3–4 mm long, extended into a twisted awn that is silky at its base and five times longer than the lemma, measuring 18–20 mm in total.

== Distribution and habitat ==
Stipa leptogluma is endemic to northern Ecuador. It is known only from a single collection made by A. Stuebel between 1870 and 1874 at Loma de Conaballa in Imbabura Province and nearby sites. The species was recorded in arid habitats of the Cangahua formation at elevations of 2100–2300 m. Its precise distribution remains uncertain.

== Conservation ==
Stipa leptogluma is endemic to the Andes of Ecuador. It is known only from a single collection made by A. Stuebel in Imbabura Province between 1870 and 1874. The species' taxonomic status remains uncertain, and no specimens are currently preserved in Ecuadorian museums. Apart from general habitat destruction, no specific threats have been identified.
