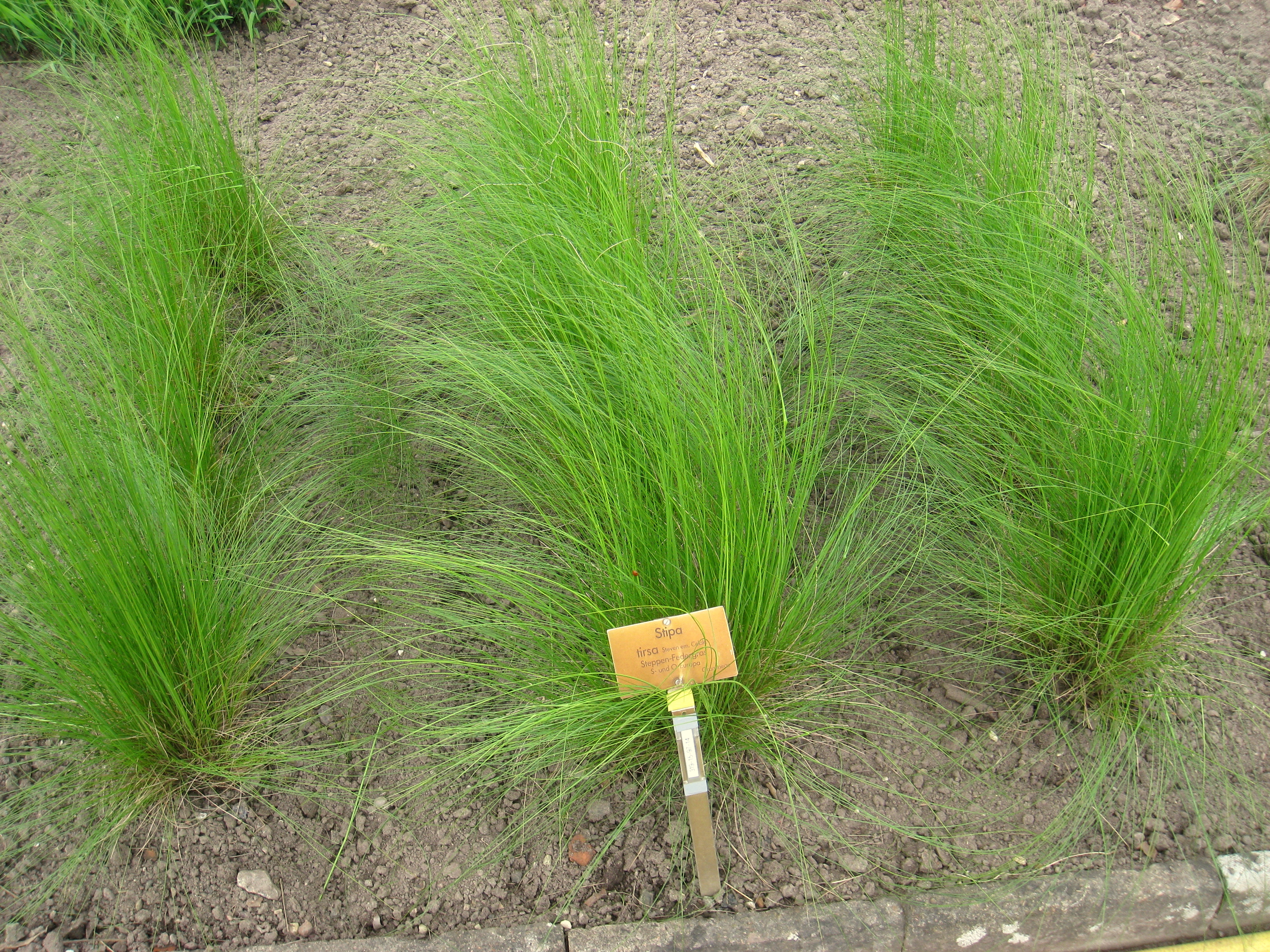

Scientific classification
- Kingdom: Plantae
- Clade: Tracheophytes
- Clade: Angiosperms
- Clade: Monocots
- Clade: Commelinids
- Order: Poales
- Family: Poaceae
- Subfamily: Pooideae
- Genus: Stipa
- Species: S. tirsa

Binomial name
- Stipa tirsa Steven

Synonyms
- Stipa cerariorum Pančić; Stipa longifolia Borbás; Stipa pennata subsp. cerariorum (Pančić) K.Richt.; Stipa pennata f. glaucescens Novák; Stipa pennata var. stenophylla Czern. ex Lindem.; Stipa pennata subsp. tirsa (Steven) K.Richt.; Stipa pennata var. tirsa (Steven) Novák; Stipa schmidtii Woronow ex Grossh.; Stipa stenophylla (Czern. ex Lindem.) Trautv.; Stipa tirsa subsp. albanica Martinovský; Stipa tirsa f. glaucescens (Novák) Soó

= Stipa tirsa =

Species of grass

Stipa tirsa is a species of perennial grass native to Europe and temperate Asia. Culms are 40–100 cm long; leaf blades are filiform, involute, and 1–2 mm wide.

== Description ==
S. tirsa is a perennial, tuft-forming grass with culms 40–100 cm tall. Leaf-sheaths are glabrous, ligules short (0.2–0.5 mm), and blades filiform, involute, 1–2 mm wide, puberulous and hairy beneath, with attenuate tips. The inflorescence is a contracted, linear panicle subtended at the base by a leaf. Spikelets are solitary, pedicelled, and 50–65 mm long, each with a single fertile floret and disarticulating at maturity. Glumes are lance-shaped (lanceolate), pointed (acuminate), membranous, and longer than the florets (50–65 mm). The fertile lemma is elliptic, 18–20 mm long, pubescent in lines, convolute around the inner bract (palea), and terminates in a single awn. The awn is bent twice (bigeniculate), 350–500 mm long, with a twisted column and feathery (plumose) limb. The inner bract equals the lemma in length, 2-veined. Flowers have three small scales (lodicules), three smooth-tipped anthers, and two stigmas; the ovary is glabrous. The fruit is a grain (caryopsis) with adherent outer layer (pericarp) and a linear narrow scar (hilum).

== Distribution and habitat ==
According to Plants of the World Online, Stipa tirsa is native to parts of Europe and Asia, occurring from the Iberian Peninsula eastwards to Siberia.

Region	Country/Areas
Balkans	Albania; Bulgaria; Northwest Balkan Peninsula
Central Europe	Austria; Czechia–Slovakia; Germany; Hungary
Southern Europe	France; Italy; Romania; Spain
Eastern Europe	Ukraine; Krym (Crimea); European Russia (Central, East, South)
Caucasus	North Caucasus; Transcaucasus
Western Asia	Türkiye
Central Asia	Kazakhstan; West Siberia

== Synonyms ==
- Stipa stenophylla (Czern. ex Lindem.) Trautv.
