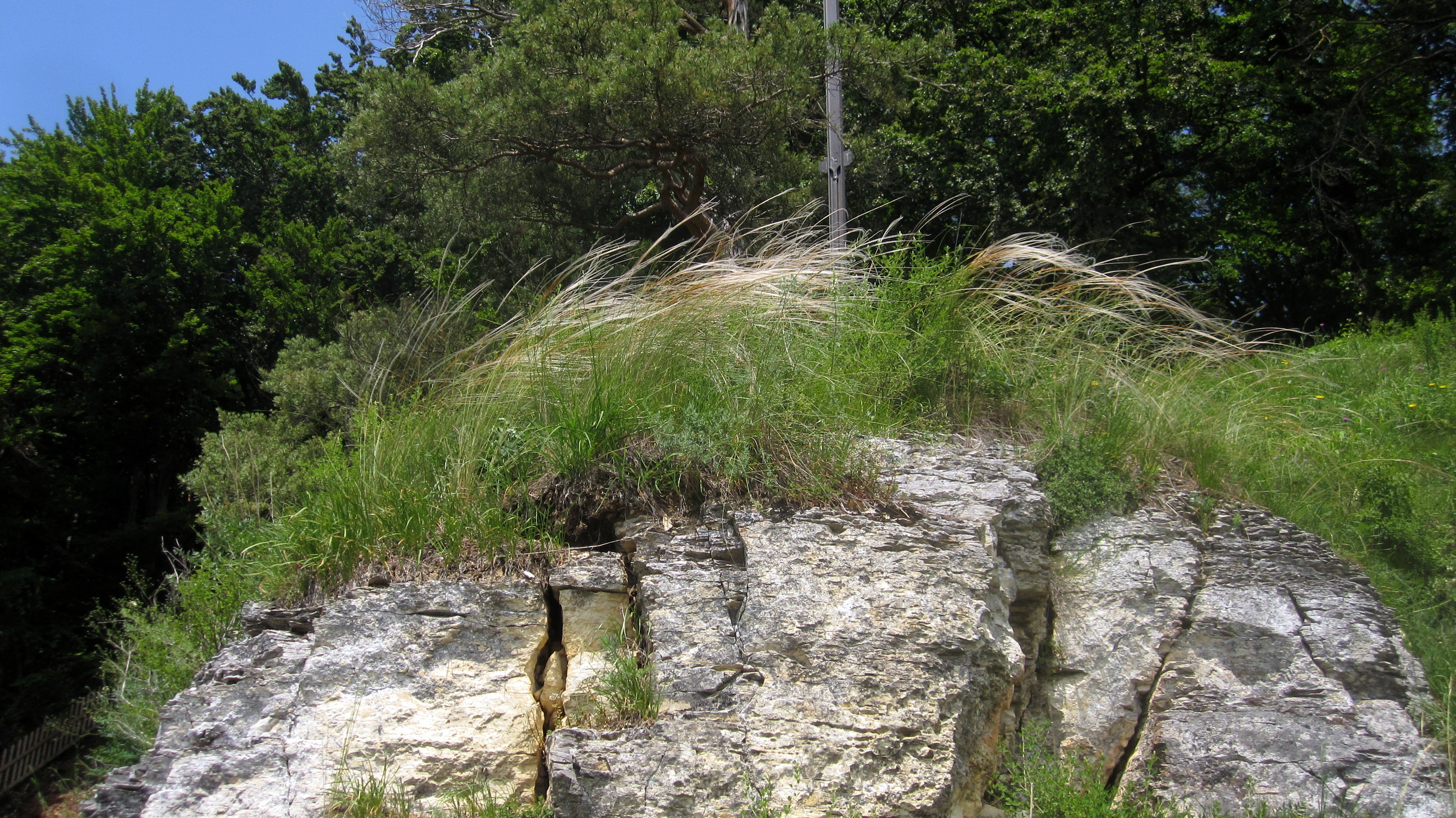

Scientific classification
- Kingdom: Plantae
- Clade: Tracheophytes
- Clade: Angiosperms
- Clade: Monocots
- Clade: Commelinids
- Order: Poales
- Family: Poaceae
- Subfamily: Pooideae
- Genus: Stipa
- Species: S. pulcherrima

Binomial name
- Stipa pulcherrima Karl Koch

Synonyms
- List: Stipa pennata var. pulcherrima (K.Koch) Asch. & Graebn.; Stipa pennata subsp. pulcherrima (K.Koch) Á.Löve & D.Löve; Stipa crassiculmis P.A.Smirn.; Stipa crassiculmis subsp. euroanatolica Martinovský; Stipa crassiculmis subsp. heterotricha Dihoru & Roman; Stipa crassiculmis subsp. picentina Martinovský, Moraldo & Caputo; Stipa epilosa Martinovský; Stipa epilosa subsp. montana Moraldo; Stipa etrusca Moraldo; Stipa glabrinoda Klokov; Stipa glabrinoda var. karadagensis (Tzvelev) Tzvelev; Stipa grafiana Steven; Stipa grafiana f. leiantha Borbás; Stipa grafiana f. pubiflora Borbás; Stipa heterophylla Klokov; Stipa jacobsii F.M.Vázquez; Stipa montana (Moraldo) Pînzaru; Stipa moraldoi Pînzaru; Stipa oligotricha subsp. etrusca (Moraldo) F.M.Vázquez; Stipa oreades Klokov; Stipa pennata var. breviglumis Maire; Stipa pennata var. grafiana (Steven) Linden; Stipa pennata subsp. grafiana (Steven) K.Richt.; Stipa pennata subsp. mediterranea (Trin. & Rupr.) Asch. & Graebn.; Stipa pennata subsp. mediterranea (Trin. & Rupr.) Brand; Stipa pennata var. mediterranea Trin. & Rupr.; Stipa platyphylla Czern. ex Trautv.; Stipa pseudomontana Landolt; Stipa pulcherrima var. alagezica Tzvelev; Stipa pulcherrima subsp. crassiculmis (P.A.Smirn.) Tzvelev; Stipa pulcherrima subsp. epilosa (Martinovský) Tzvelev; Stipa pulcherrima subsp. glabrinoda (Klokov) Tzvelev; Stipa pulcherrima subsp. grafiana (Steven) Pacz.; Stipa pulcherrima var. karadagensis Tzvelev; Stipa pulcherrima f. leiantha (Borbás) Soó; Stipa pulcherrima subsp. mediterranea (Trin. & Rupr.) O.Schwarz; Stipa pulcherrima f. nudicostata Martinovský; Stipa pulcherrima subsp. palatina H.Scholz & Korneck; Stipa pulcherrima f. pubiflora (Borbás) Soó; Stipa rigida Martinovský; Stipa turcica Martinovský; Stipa valdemonensis Cataldo, S.A.Giardina, Moraldo & Raimondo

= Stipa pulcherrima =

Species of grass

Stipa pulcherrima, golden feather grass is a bisexual flowering plant in the family Poaceae.

== Description ==
It is 40–100 centimetres (16–39 in) high, while its eciliate membrane is 5–7 millimetres (0.20–0.28 in) long. Its leaf-blades are erect, conduplicated, and sometimes ascend. They are 20–40 centimetres (7.9–15.7 in) long and are 1–1.5 millimetres (0.039–0.059 in) wide with smooth surface which can also be scaberulous and glabrous. The panicles are smooth and contracted. Also, they are elliptic and 10–15 centimetres (3.9–5.9 in) in length. They bear a few spikelets which are glabrous or ciliate and can range from 45–70 millimetres (1.8–2.8 in) in length. Compressed spikelets have only 1 floret which doesn't have rhachilla extension. Its floret callus is elongated, bearded, pungent, straight, curved and is 3–4 millimetres (0.12–0.16 in) in length. It glumes are similar to the fertile spikelet. The lower glume is 60–80 millimetres (2.4–3.1 in) long and is lanceolate. The upper glume is also lanceolated and is 40–70 millimetres (1.6–2.8 in) long.

== Distribution ==
The species is distributed across southern, central, and eastern Europe, extending into the Caucasus and parts of western and central Asia.

Region	Countries/areas
Southern Europe	Albania; Greece; Italy (Sicilia, Corse); Türkiye
Central Europe	Austria; Bulgaria; Czechia–Slovakia; Germany; Hungary; Romania; France
Eastern Europe	Ukraine; Krym; Central European Russia; East European Russia; South European Russia
Balkan Peninsula	NW. Balkan Peninsula
Caucasus	North Caucasus; Transcaucasus
Western Asia	Iran; Turkmenistan
Central Asia	Kazakhstan; Kirgizstan; West Siberia
