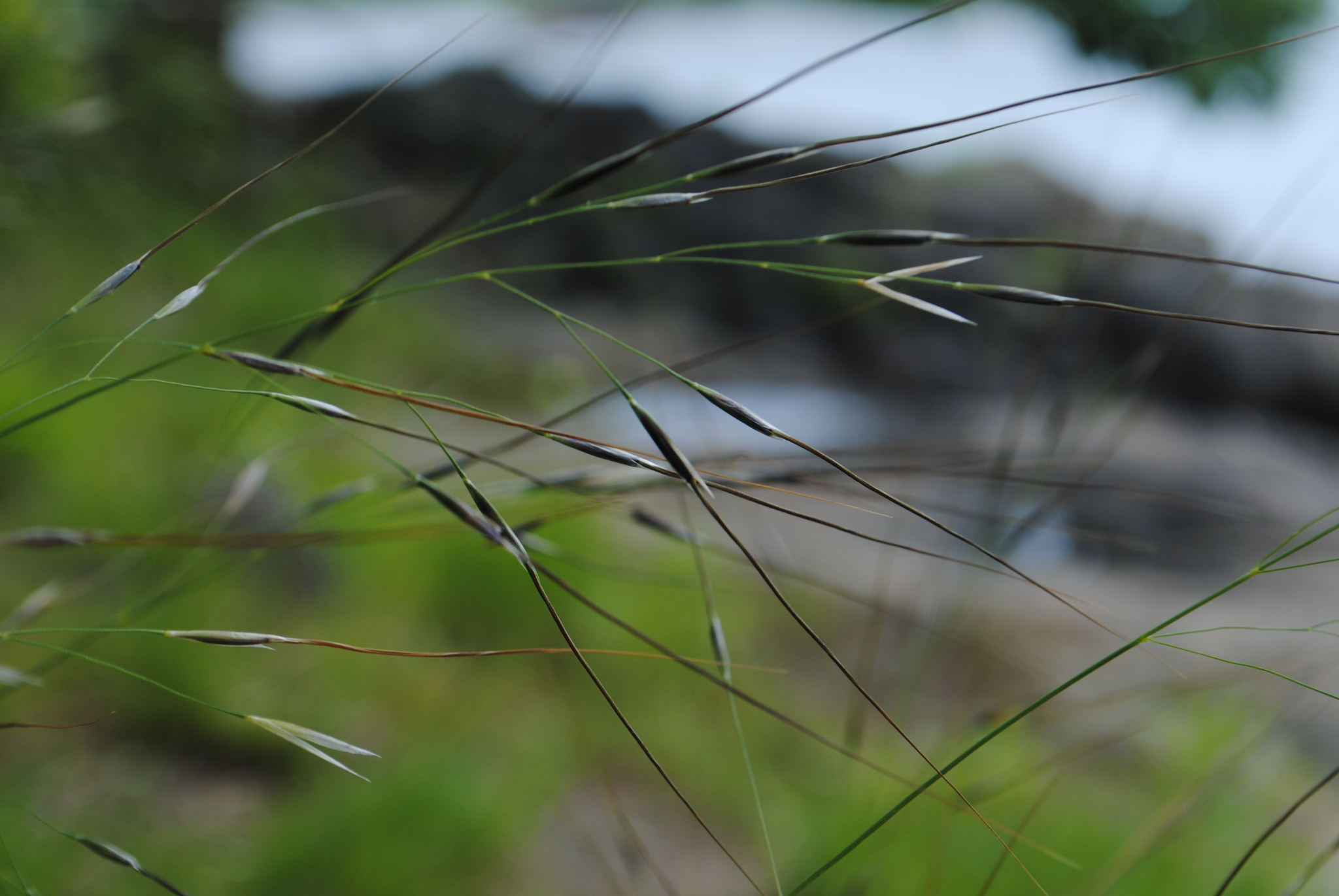

Scientific classification
- Kingdom: Plantae
- Clade: Tracheophytes
- Clade: Angiosperms
- Clade: Monocots
- Clade: Commelinids
- Order: Poales
- Family: Poaceae
- Subfamily: Pooideae
- Genus: Piptochaetium
- Species: P. avenaceum

Binomial name
- Piptochaetium avenaceum (L.) Parodi

Synonyms
- List: Piptochaetium avenacellum Barkworth; Piptochaetium leianthum (L.) Raf.; Podopogon barbatus (Pers.) Raf.; Stipa avenacea L.; Stipa barbata Michx.; Stipa diffusa Willd. ex Steud.; Stipa leiantha Hitchc.; Stipa virginica Pers.

= Piptochaetium avenaceum =

Species of flowering plant

Piptochaetium avenaceum, commonly called black oat grass, blackseed needle grass or blackseed speargrass, is a species of perennial bunchgrass native to eastern North America. It is a member of the grass family Poaceae.

== Distribution ==
Piptochaetium avenaceum is commonly found in the eastern United States, within various types of habitats, which include:

- grasslands
- deciduous hardwood hammocks, thickets, and dry woods.
- upland woodlands and forests (such as dryer oak woodlands).
- savannas and clearings.
- rocky slopes and outcrops.

The species distribution is mostly found in the eastern United States. It is found in the Great Lakes region of the U.S. Midwest and Ontario, Canada, and the shortgrass prairies of the south-central U.S. as well.

The range has been documented in: Alabama; Pennsylvania; Rhode Island, New York and Florida, North and South Carolina; Georgia; Michigan; Illinois; Oklahoma, and other states adjacent to these.

== Description ==
Piptochaetium avenaceum, Black oat grass, consists of fine leaf texture that appear to be bristle-like. Its leaves are long and elongate, reaching up to 3 feet (0.91 m) in height.

The plant is easily recognizable when flowering or fruiting. It can be identified by its open inflorescences, which are thin and usually cannot be seen from a distance. The branches within these inflorescences are very thin and thus can create effects of spikelets that appear to be floating in mid air.

It also consists of awns, which are hairlike projections containing multicellular organisms that obtain nutrients through photosynthesis. The awns can twist and un-twist in circumstances depending on the humidity and temperature of the area, which is required for them in order to thrive within soil. They also protrude from individual flowers in the flowering clusters, which tend to develop between late spring and early summer (normally April to June).

Panicles also exist within this species where it rises above the plant's rolled and thread-like leaves. It contains slender open branches, a few narrow scales and spikelets that consist of one flower. The ripened flowering heads within the spikelet remain on the grass usually until autumn, in which the awns tend to bend and twist, spreading widely from the scales.

The seeds are formed as sharp needles. The palea (bract-like organs found within species of grass) tends to be long and blackish, in which the upper part consists of bent and twisted awns.

== Uses ==
=== Cultivation ===
==== Gardens ====
Stipa avenacea is cultivated as an ornamental grass by plant nurseries, for traditional and native plant gardens, and natural landscaping and habitat restoration projects. Black oat grass is drought-tolerant, and used in xeriscaping (water-conserving landscape design).

The plant is hardy to USDA zone 2, a U.S. Hardiness Zone rating. It needs good drainage and full sun. The plants flower during the summer season.

The dried flower stalks can be used in floral arrangements, and created into feathery plumes in a variety of colors.

==== Erosion control ====
The black oat grass or blackseed speargrass plant, with the typically deep root system of a bunchgrass, is planted for erosion control—soil care. It can be planted along vulnerable areas (such as stream banks) where it can form a dense mat through water flow.

==== Cover crop ====
Piptochaetium avenaceum can be used as a cover crop, in which they are grown after a crop has been cut so that soil can be replenished, and is thus plowed back into the garden rather than being harvested. It is commonly said that oat grass is a good choice to use as a cover crop because when they die during the winter time, the residue will be much easier to handle when working with the soil, while preparing for planting season.

Black oat grass can also serve as a 'net' to cover other simultaneously planted seeds, and later seedlings, from bird deprivation.

== See also ==
- Ornamental grasses
- Bunchgrasses of North America
- Grasses of the United States
- List of Poaceae Genera
