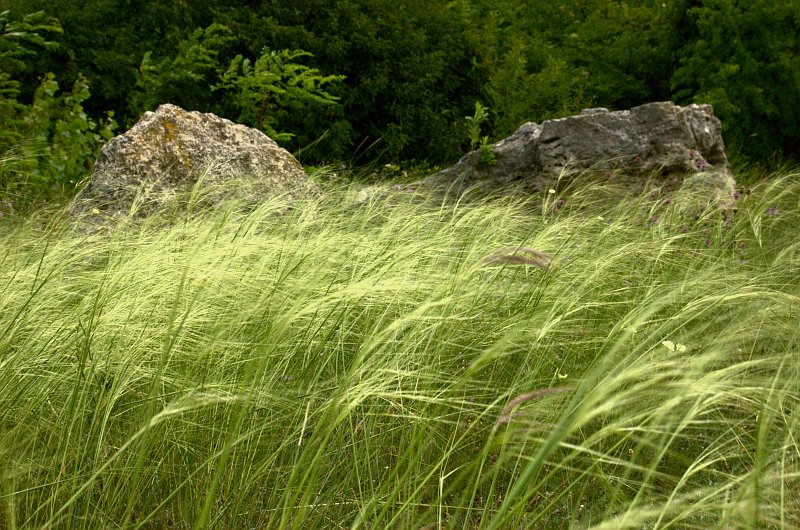

Scientific classification
- Kingdom: Plantae
- Clade: Tracheophytes
- Clade: Angiosperms
- Clade: Monocots
- Clade: Commelinids
- Order: Poales
- Family: Poaceae
- Subfamily: Pooideae
- Genus: Stipa
- Species: S. pennata

Binomial name
- Stipa pennata L.

Subspecies
- Stipa pennata subsp. ceynowae; Stipa pennata subsp. pennata

= Stipa pennata =

European feather grass

Species of grass

Stipa pennata, commonly known as European feather grass, is a flowering plant and arid zone sand grass in the grass family Poaceae, which is grown as an ornamental plant for its feathery flowering spikes. It is one of the most common plants of the Eurasian Steppe from Mongolia in the east to the Puszta in Hungary and the Devínska Kobyla forest-steppe in Slovakia in the west. Its foliage is green in summer while the flowers are silvery-grey during the same season. It is 60–90 centimetres (24–35 in) high.
