= Nassella mexicana =

Scientific classification
- Kingdom: Plantae
- Clade: Tracheophytes
- Clade: Angiosperms
- Clade: Monocots
- Clade: Commelinids
- Order: Poales
- Family: Poaceae
- Subfamily: Pooideae
- Genus: Nassella
- Species: N. mexicana

Binomial name
- Nassella mexicana (Hitchc.) R.W.Pohl (1990)

Synonyms
- Jarava mexicana (Hitchc.) D.L.Fu (2024); Piptochaetium mexicanum (Hitchc.) Beetle (1983); Stipa mexicana Hitchc. (1925)

Species of grass

Nassella mexicana is a species of grass. It is a perennial native to the mountains of the tropical Americas, ranging from northeastern Mexico to Guatemala, and through the Andes of South America from northwestern Venezuela to northwestern Argentina. In Colombia it grows between 2500 and 3500 meters elevation. It grows in the poor soil on the top of hillocks to escape competition from other faster growing species.
