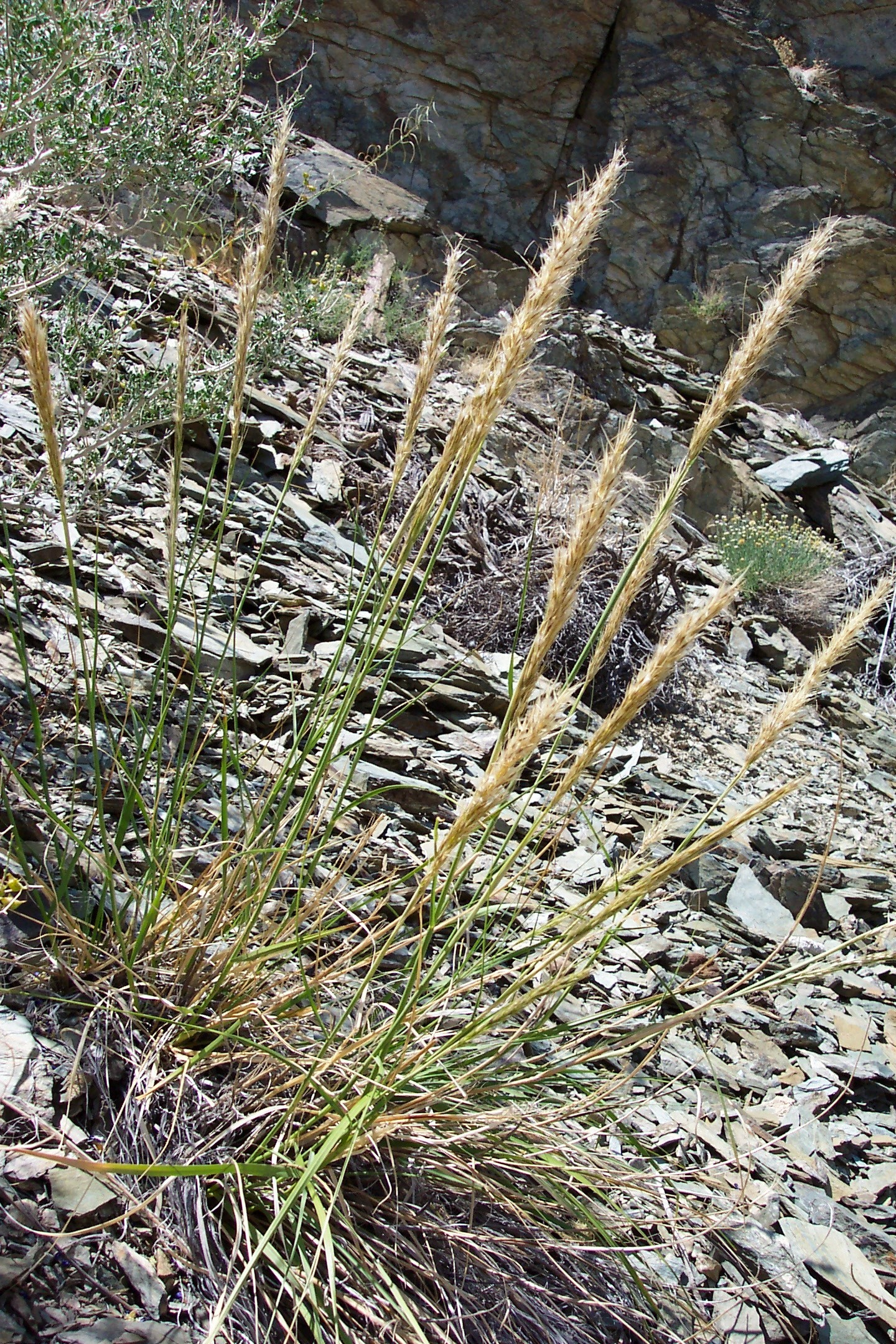
- Achnatherum parishii

Scientific classification
- Kingdom: Plantae
- Clade: Tracheophytes
- Clade: Angiosperms
- Clade: Monocots
- Clade: Commelinids
- Order: Poales
- Family: Poaceae
- Subfamily: Pooideae
- Supertribe: Stipodae
- Tribe: Stipeae
- Genus: Achnatherum; P. Beauv.

Species
- about 20 species, see text

Synonyms
- Aristella Bertol.; Lasiagrostis Link, nom. superfl.

= Achnatherum =

Genus of flowering plants

Achnatherum is a genus of flowering plants in the grass family, Poaceae. It includes 20 species of needlegrass native to temperate Eurasia and North Africa. Several needlegrass species have been switched between Achnatherum and genus Stipa; taxonomy between the two closely related genera is still uncertain. In 2019 Peterson et al. reorganized the genera in tribe Stipeae based on molecular DNA studies, and placed the species from the Americas into other genera.

== Description ==
The genus Achnatherum (syn. Lasiagrostis) is closely related to Stipa but can be distinguished by several morphological traits. Unlike Stipa, the young leaves of Achnatherum are convolute (rolled inward) rather than folded. Its spikelets are laterally compressed, and the lemma bears spreading hairs up to 4 mm long near the base. The awn is either straight or gently curved, but never abruptly bent (geniculate) or twisted below, which sets it apart from the characteristic awns of Stipa.

== Taxonomy ==
=== Original Description ===
The genus Achnatherum was first described by Palisot de Beauvois in 1812 in his Essai d'une Nouvelle Agrostographie. The protologue reads (translated):

Genus … Achnatherum, nov.; Plate VI, figure VII

Species formerly referred to Calamagrostis (Adanson, Roth, Decandolle); to Agrostis (Linnaeus, Jussieu, etc.); and to Arundo (Koeler). Panicle compound, loose; glumes longer than the membranous paleas; lower palea nearly notched at the apex, bearing a twisted, non-jointed awn; upper palea entire, acute; lodicules lanceolate, entire, glabrous; style short, divided into two parts; stigmas villous; seed furrowed. Species included: Agrostis calamagrostis L.; A. miliacea; A. tenuifolia; A. sobolifera; A. conspicua; A. bromoides? (Persoon, Willdenow); Arundo lanceolata Koeler.

Observation: This genus appears closely allied to Calamagrostis; but differs in bearing an awn; having the lower palea simply notched without bristle; and the upper palea entire.

=== Botanical history ===
The genus Achnatherum was first described by Palisot de Beauvois in Essai d'une Nouvelle Agrostographie (1812), where it was distinguished from allied genera such as Agrostis and Calamagrostis by its awned lemmas and distinctive palea morphology. In 1834, Bertoloni introduced the segregate genus Aristella in Flora Italica, describing species such as Aristella bromoides. Other authors also used names like Lasiagrostis Link (1827) for similar taxa. Modern taxonomic treatments, including Plants of the World Online and World Flora Online, regard Aristella and Lasiagrostis as heterotypic synonyms of Achnatherum.

During the 19th and 20th centuries, species now placed in Achnatherum were variously assigned to Stipa, Agrostis, and Arundo, reflecting uncertainty in the delimitation of tribe Stipeae. Recent molecular phylogenetic studies have clarified relationships within the tribe, supporting the recognition of Achnatherum as a distinct lineage and consolidating former segregate genera under this name.

== Species ==
19 species are accepted by Plants of the World Online as of December 2025:

- Achnatherum brandisii (Mez) Z.L.Wu
- Achnatherum bromoides (L.) P.Beauv.
- Achnatherum calamagrostis (L.) P.Beauv.
- Achnatherum confusum (Litv.) Tzvelev
- Achnatherum daqinggouense L.Q.Zhao & Yi-ru-gui
- Achnatherum haussknechtii (Boiss.) M.Nobis
- Achnatherum inebrians (Hance) Keng
- Achnatherum jacquemontii (Jaub. & Spach) P.C.Kuo & S.L.Lu
- Achnatherum mandavillei (Freitag) M.Nobis
- Achnatherum nakaii (Honda) Tateoka
- Achnatherum paradoxum (L.) Banfi, Galasso & Bartolucci
- Achnatherum pekinense (Hance) Ohwi
- Achnatherum pelliotii (Danguy) Röser & Hamasha
- Achnatherum pilosum Z.S.Zhang & W.L.Chen
- Achnatherum pubicalyx (Ohwi) Keng f. ex P.C.Kuo
- Achnatherum sibiricum (L.) Keng ex Tzvelev
- Achnatherum staintonii (Bor) M.Nobis & P.D.Gudkova
- Achnatherum turcomanicum (Roshev.) Tzvelev
- Achnatherum virescens (Trin.) Banfi, Galasso & Bartolucci

=== Unplaced species ===
- Achnatherum roshevitzii Mussajev (unplaced) - Roshevich's achnatherum

=== Formerly placed here ===
Species previously included in Achnatherum:

- Amelichloa brachychaeta (Godr.) Arriaga & Barkworth (as Achnatherum brachychaetum (Godr.) Barkworth) - punagrass
- Amelichloa caudata (Trin.) Arriaga & Barkworth (as Achnatherum caudatum (Trin.) S.L.W.Jacobs & J.Everett) - Chilean ricegrass
- Amelichloa clandestina (Hack.) Arriaga & Barkworth (as Achnatherum clandestinum (Hack.) Barkworth) - Mexican ricegrass
- Barkworthia stillmanii (Bol.) Romasch., P.M.Peterson & Soreng (as Achnatherum stillmanii (Bol.) Barkworth) - Stillman's needlegrass
- Eriocoma arida (M.E.Jones) Romasch. (as Achnatherum aridum (M.E.Jones) Barkworth) - Mormon needlegrass
- Eriocoma × bloomeri (Bol.) Romasch. (as Achnatherum × bloomeri (Boland.) Barkworth) - Bloomer's ricegrass
- Eriocoma contracta (B.L.Johnson) Romasch. (as Achnatherum contractum (B.L. Johnson) Barkworth) - contracted ricegrass
- Eriocoma coronata (Thurb.) Romasch. (as Achnatherum coronatum (Thurb.) Barkworth) - crested needlegrass
- Eriocoma curvifolia (Swallen) Romasch. (as Achnatherum curvifolium (Swallen) Barkworth) - Guadalupe ricegrass
- Eriocoma hymenoides (Roem. & Schult.) Rydb. (as Achnatherum hymenoides (Roem. & Schult.) Barkworth) - Indian ricegrass
- Eriocoma hendersonii (Vasey) Romasch. (as Achnatherum hendersonii (Vasey) Barkworth) - Henderson's needlegrass
- Eriocoma latiglumis (Swallen) Romasch. (as Achnatherum latiglume (Swallen) Barkworth) - wide-glumed needlegrass
- Eriocoma lemmonii (Vasey) Romasch. (Achnatherum lemmonii (Vasey) Barkworth) - Lemmon's needlegrass
- Eriocoma lettermanii (Vasey) Romasch. (as Achnatherum lettermanii (Vasey) Barkworth) - Letterman's needlegrass
- Eriocoma lobata (Swallen) Romasch. (as Achnatherum lobatum (Swallen) Barkworth) - lobed needlegrass
- Eriocoma nelsonii (Scribn.) Romasch. (as Achnatherum nelsonii (Scribn.) Barkworth) - Nelson's needlegrass, Dore's needlegrass
- Eriocoma nevadensis (B.L.Johnson) Romasch. (as Achnatherum nevadense (B.L. Johnson) Barkworth) - Nevada needlegrass
- Eriocoma occidentalis (Thurb. ex S.Watson) Romasch. (as Achnatherum occidentale (Thurb.) Barkworth) - western needlegrass
- Eriocoma parishii (Vasey) Romasch. (as Achnatherum parishii (Vasey) Barkworth) - Parish's needlegrass
- Eriocoma perplexa (Hoge & Barkworth) Romasch. (as Achnatherum perplexum Hoge & Barkworth) - perplexing needlegrass
- Eriocoma pinetorum (M.E.Jones) Romasch. (as Achnatherum pinetorum (M.E. Jones) Barkworth) - pinewoods needlegrass
- Eriocoma richardsonii (Link) Romasch. (as Achnatherum richardsonii (Link) Barkworth) - Richardson's needlegrass
- Eriocoma robusta (Vasey) Romasch. (as Achnatherum robustum (Vasey) Barkworth) - sleepygrass
- Eriocoma scribneri (Vasey) Romasch. (as Achnatherum scribneri (Vasey) Barkworth) - Scribner needlegrass
- Eriocoma thurberiana (Piper) Romasch. (as Achnatherum thurberianum (Piper) Barkworth) - Thurber's needlegrass
- Eriocoma swallenii (C.L.Hitchc. & Spellenb.) Romasch. (as Achnatherum swallenii (C.L. Hitchc. & Spellenb.) Barkworth) - Swallen's needlegrass
- Eriocoma webberi Thurb. (as Achnatherum webberi (Thurb.) Barkworth) - Webber needlegrass
- Neotrinia splendens (Trin.) M.Nobis, P.D.Gudkova & A.Nowak (as Achnatherum splendens (Trin.) Nevsky)
- Pappostipa speciosa (Trin. & Rupr.) Romasch. (as Achnatherum speciosum Trin. & Rupr.) - desert needlegrass
- Pentameris pallida (Thunb.) Galley & H.P.Linder (as Achnatherum capense (L.) P.Beauv.)
- Ptilagrostis duthiei (Hook.f.) M.Nobis & P.D.Gudkova (as Achnatherum duthiei (Hook.f.) P.C.Kuo & S.L.Lu)
- Pseudoeriocoma acuta (Swallen) Romasch. (as Achnatherum acutum (Swallen) Valdés-Reyna & Barkworth)
- Pseudoeriocoma editorum (E.Fourn.) Romasch. (as Achnatherum editorum (E.Fourn.) Valdés-Reyna & Barkworth)
- Pseudoeriocoma eminens (Cav.) Romasch. (as Achnatherum eminens (Cav.) Barkworth) - southwestern needlegrass
- Stipellula parviflora (Desf.) Röser & Hamasha (as Achnatherum parviflorum Desf.) M.Nobis - Small-flowered needlegrass
- Thorneochloa diegoensis (Swallen) Romasch. (as Achnatherum diegoense (Swallen) Barkworth) - San Diego needlegrass
- Timouria conferta (Poir.) Sennikov (as Achnatherum caragana (Trin.) Nevski)
