= Aiken Canyon Preserve =

State property in Colorado, U.S.

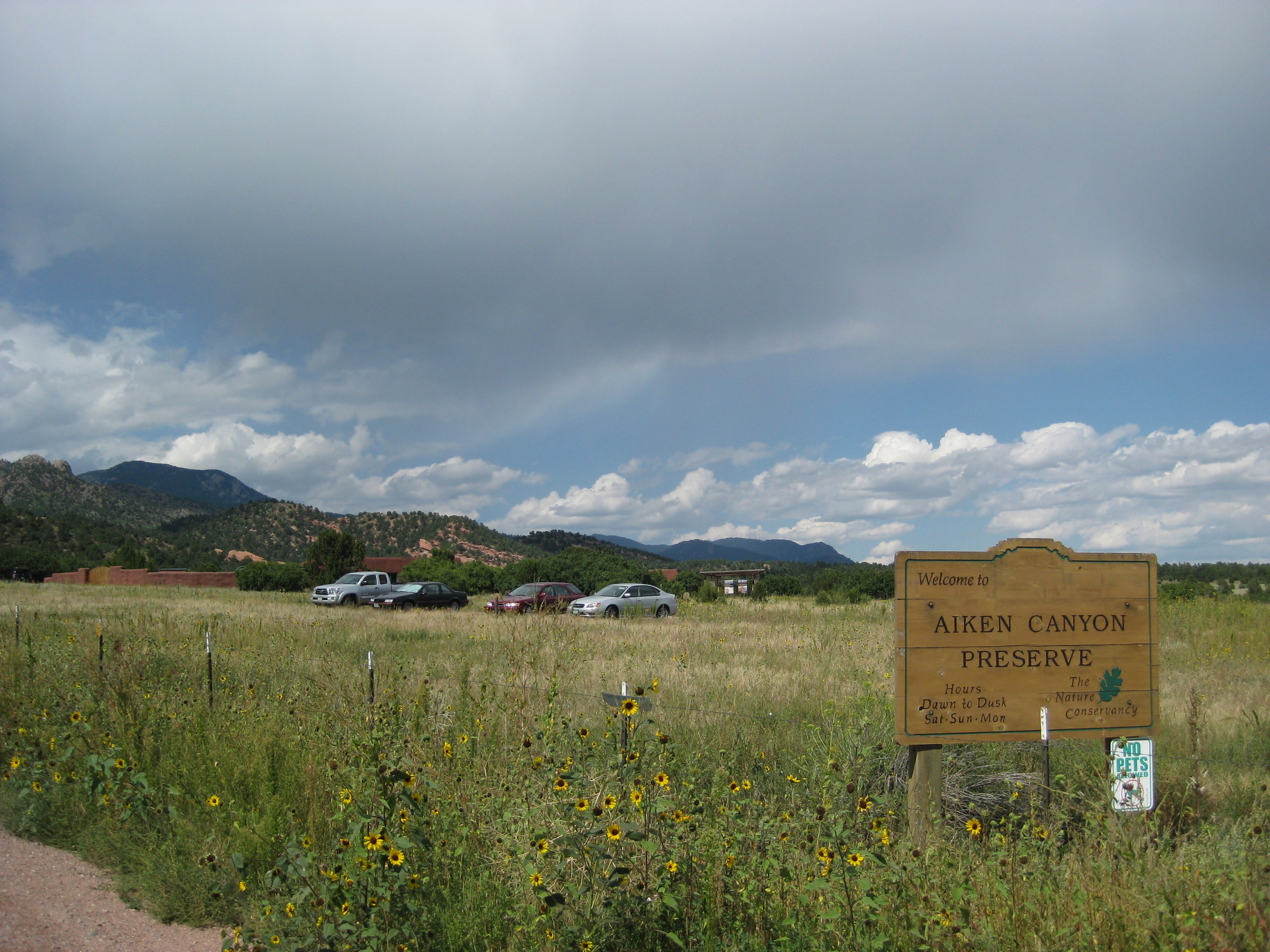
- Entrance of Aiken Canyon Preserve
- Area: 6.56 km^{2} (2.53 mi^{2})

Geography
- Location: Colorado, U.S.
- Population center: Between Colorado Springs and Canon City
- Coordinates: 38.620624°N 104.88795°W
- Interactive map of Aiken Canyon Preserve

Aiken Canyon Preserve is a 1,621-acre (6.56 km^{2}) Nature Conservancy-managed state property in Colorado. It was first observed and named after Charles Aiken, a 19th-century U.S. surveyor, pioneer, and ornithologist who first surveyed the region in the 1870s and identified more than 75 bird species. The preserve consists of foothills, shrub and woodland ecosystems and is 12.4 miles (20.0 km) southeast from Colorado Springs located on the eastern slope of the Rampart Range which is within a smaller foothill system of the Front Range. The surrounding mountain ranges of the Rampart Range and Palmer Divide created the nature preserves sustainable ecosystem. There is also a four-mile (6 km)-loop hiking trail on the preserve.

The preservation title came into effect in 1991 when the Nature Conservancy signed a 99-year conservation lease to maintain exclusive rights of 1,080 acres (440 hectares) while still being state-owned, the Nature Conservancy then acquired the remaining 541 acres (219 hectares) which totalled the preserve to 1,621 acres (656 hectares) of land. The land still left on the east side of Aiken canyon is owned by Fort Carson and the remaining west side is owned by the Bureau of Land Management.

Aiken Canyon is one of the state's Natural Areas and one of The Nature Conservancy protects, an effort that began more than 50 years ago. Its mission is to "preserve the plants, animals and natural communities that represent the diversity of life of Earth by protecting the lands and waters they need to survive".

== History ==
=== Fires ===
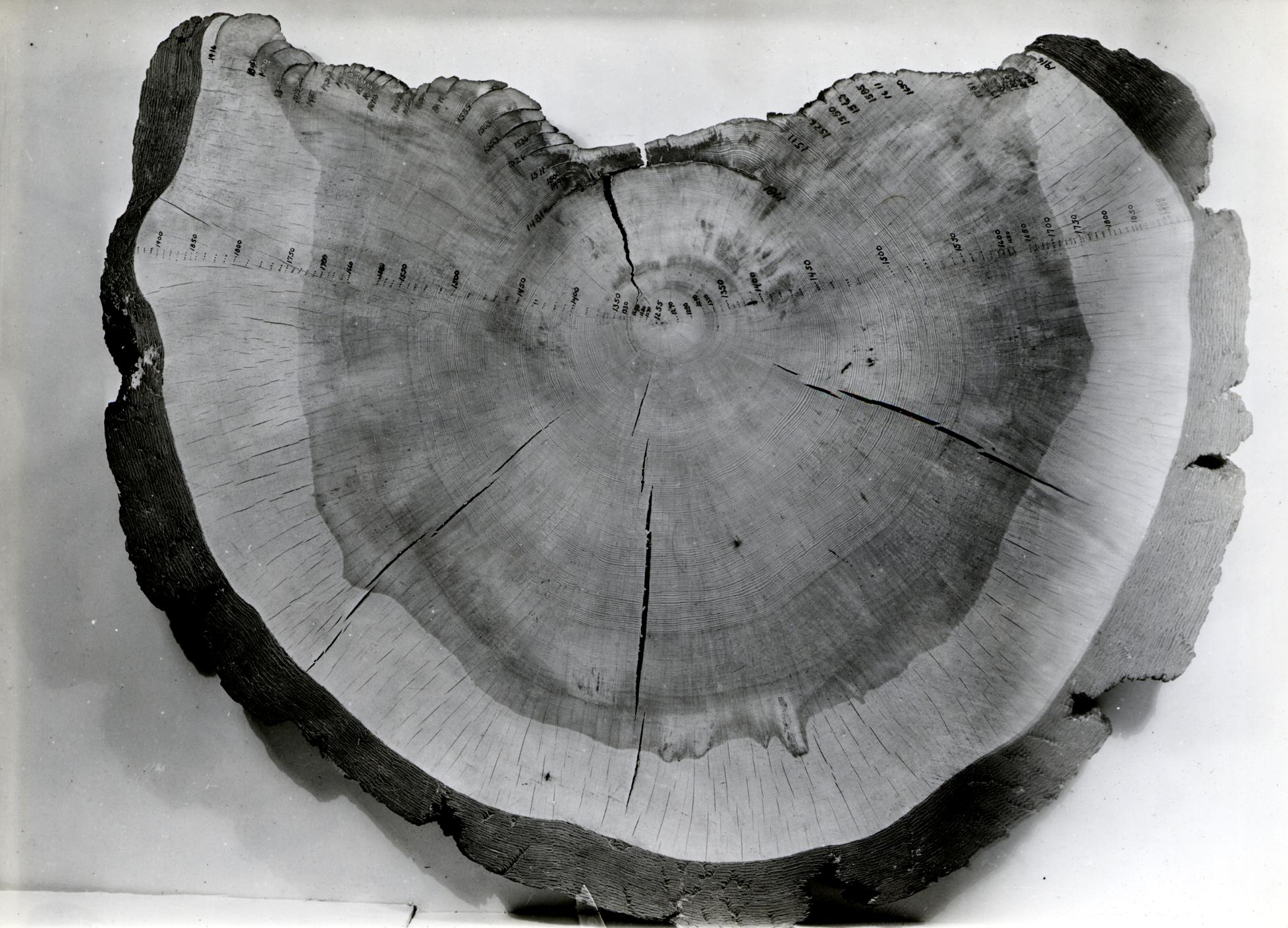
Ponderosa pine tree stump showing a cross section of growth rings and fire scars

From the dendrochronology of a cross-section examination of Ponderosa Pine Trees (Pinus ponderosa), it was found that between the years of 1602 and 1999 there were over 20 fire incidents at Aiken canyon preserve. There were also "five fire years including 1753, 1839, 1859, 1892 and 1933".

These occurrences were suggested to be from railroad expansion and cattle ranching from the result of frequent mailing services within the area between 1872 and 1935 as well as changing weather patterns.

The finding of gold within the Front Range area early 19th century lead to the establishment of Denver city in Colorado which then created mailing service popularity. The frequent mailing services then lead to the establishment of railroads such as the Kansas Pacific, Union Pacific, Denver Pacific Railway and Telegraph Company and the Denver and Rio Grande Railway. The expansion of these railroads near Aiken Canyon brought cattle ranching to the area as it was common for cattle to be sold to the gold miners in exchange for gold. This construction and agriculture expansion increased the rangeland area burning for better cattle fodder. The areas are burned to maneuver the cattle into better vegetative patches of land to exclude the already used up grasslands. This cycle of occurrences caused the majority of the historical fire instances.

The El Niño-Southern Oscillation has also been shown to have contributed to other fire anomalies at the Aiken canyon area between the periods of 1753 and 1935. This association is due to the lower elevation forests of Ponderosa Pine trees which are expanded through seed disbursement during the wetter than usual weather periods of El Niño during summer and spring along with periods of La Niña which create a climate that is drier than usual with droughts, lack of humidity and precipitation. The drier periods created lagged fire occurrences which fueled the wildfires with the Ponderosa Pine trees around the Rocky Mountains and specifically Front Range area through the cycle of warm and cold climate changes.

Further information received from the tree skeleton plots and fire-scarring also indicated evidence of short intervals of fire re-occurrence which were more than double for the periods of 1872 to 1935, this is when fires happen more frequently from the previous wildfire. The shorter re-occurrences are known by researchers to contribute to environmental damage as it does not allow growth and expansion of species and vegetation.

Fire suppression methods such as logging and controlled burning were not common in Colorado until after 1910 which was speculated to be the result of the Great fire of 1910. These suppression methods were only practical when a Civilian Conservation Corps was formed in 1935 which enabled conservation jobs nearby at the canyon. The Civilian Conservation Corps was formed as a nine-year program to reduce the effects of the great depression during the 1930s by giving working jobs to the unemployed, which usually consisted of park and preserve maintenance and the construction of shelters and trails such as those in the Aiken Canyon area. Volunteer programs are still used by the Nature Conservancy to maintain the park lands and reduce potential fire and weed hazards.

The Nature Conservancy now implements controlled burning methods in forest land areas to induce regeneration of certain species, which was the result of knowledge from previous fire occurrences at Aiken canyon.

=== Field station ===
Aiken canyon preserve had a field station as of 1996, it was a 1,700 square foot (158 square meters) building and served as an educational facility for the public, students and researchers. The station was mainly utilised by a staff group of 15 individuals who managed the conservancy of the land.

When the field station was fully operational, interactions with visitors and researchers included activities such as "exploration trips, management of the infrastructure and hiking trail, bird watching and monitoring, inventory, weed management plans as well as teaching programs for schools". The Nature Conservancy also hosted multiple bird watching programs during the summer and winter months since 1995.

The field station was set for demolition and then reconstruction towards the end of September 2016 due to mould pollutants in the structure from hay insulation. It was decided to leave demolished with funding not being reinstated as the Nature Conservancy had limited resources towards the project and re-establishment. Instead of the field station renewal, the Nature Conservancy stated that they would instead build a structure which would serve as a meeting point for hikers and low socioeconomic children to part-take in certain nature activities at Aiken Canyon towards the end of 2016.

== Attractions ==
=== Hiking trail ===
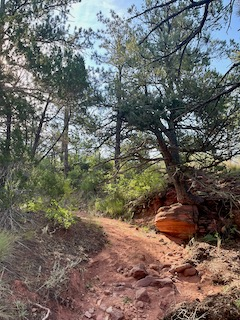
Aiken Cañon arroyo

The main hiking trail at the Aiken Canyon preserve is a 4-mile (6.4 km) loop that has a high point elevation of 6,885 feet (2,099 m) and the lowest descent of 6,440 feet (1,960 m). The trail is described as starting at an information kiosk which then at 0.1 miles (160 m) drops down near the creek bed, it then turns right at 0.7 miles (1.1 km) which leads to a junction section near cabin ruins at 1–1.7 miles (1.6–2.7 km). The lookout area is then reached at 1.8 miles (2.9 km), after that the trail returns to a looping section at 2.7 miles (4.3 km) which then returns to the beginning at about 3.4–4 miles (5.5–6.4 km). "The trail is used by hikers, runners, bird watching groups and field trips in the area".

=== Nature educational programs ===
The Nature Conservancy at Aiken Canyon Preserve host multiple educational opportunities for children, visitors and researchers; these programs are usually available during the summer with an approximate of 12 school groups each year. There is also a close relationship between the conservancy and nearby colleges who may need to use the preserve for research and other purposes.

== Biology and ecology ==
The environmental coverage between the north side of Palmer Divide and the higher slopes of the Rampart Range created an ecological system of grass and woodland in Aiken canyon. The biological communities at the canyon reside near the Beaver Creek area which provides a protected and sheltered area for plants, organisms and animals to grow and repopulate.

=== Flora ===
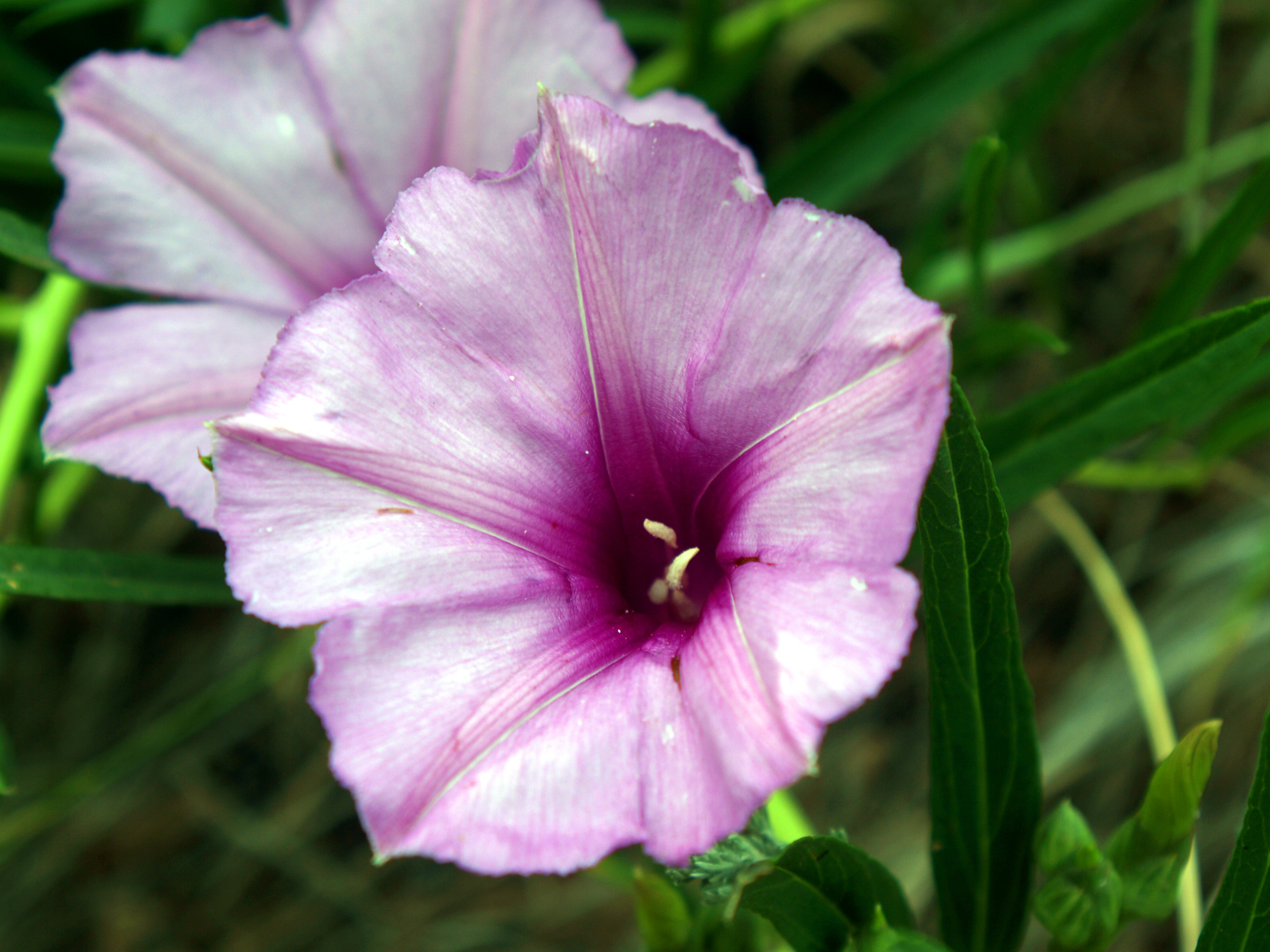
Ipomoea leptophylla

The flowering season at Aiken Canyon ranges between the end of May and June. There are two main rare plant communities within the canyon region, such includes the Piñon pine group as well as Juniperus monosperma. At higher altitudes, the lands at the canyon are mainly consistent of pinyon-juniper woodlands and the lower escalations of the land consist of grasslands. Unexpected plants in the area include Ipomoea leptophylla (bush morning-glory) and Penstemon brandegeei (Brandegee's Penstemon). The mixed-grass and tallgrass species at the canyon provide habitat to many species of plants and animals. Example of such plants includes other grass species such as prairie sandreed(Calamovilfa longifolia), little bluestem (Schizachyrium scoparium), scribner needle grass (Stipa scribneri) and big bluestem (Andropogon gerardii); these species are usually confined to the canyon region due to land restrictions from developments in the surrounding areas.

Other inhabiting plants also include Achnatherum (scribner needlegrass) and the Quercus gambelii (gamble oak).

Pollination of flowers at Aiken Canyon are mainly performed by solitary bees, which are bees that act alone rather than in communities. During the observational study of pollen in flowers at the canyon, it was found that more pollen was removed by insects such as bees than in any other surrounding areas. This was indicated by researchers where the pollen counts from the day after were 73% less than what it was previously at. This more frequent pollination from flowers is why the Aiken Canyon area have rare plant and floral communities.

It was found that saplings in the Aiken Canyon region are at a higher reproduction rate due to the partial shaded areas where 80% of sample plant seedlings showed this preference.

Aiken Canyon Preserve was ranked as number 41 on the ‘very high biodiversity significance’ category within preservation areas of El Paso County. This is due to the area having a 'A-ranked' global ranking in dependent on land species such as the two-needle pinyon (Pinus edulis) and mountain mahogany shrubland (Muhlenbergia montana).

=== Fauna ===
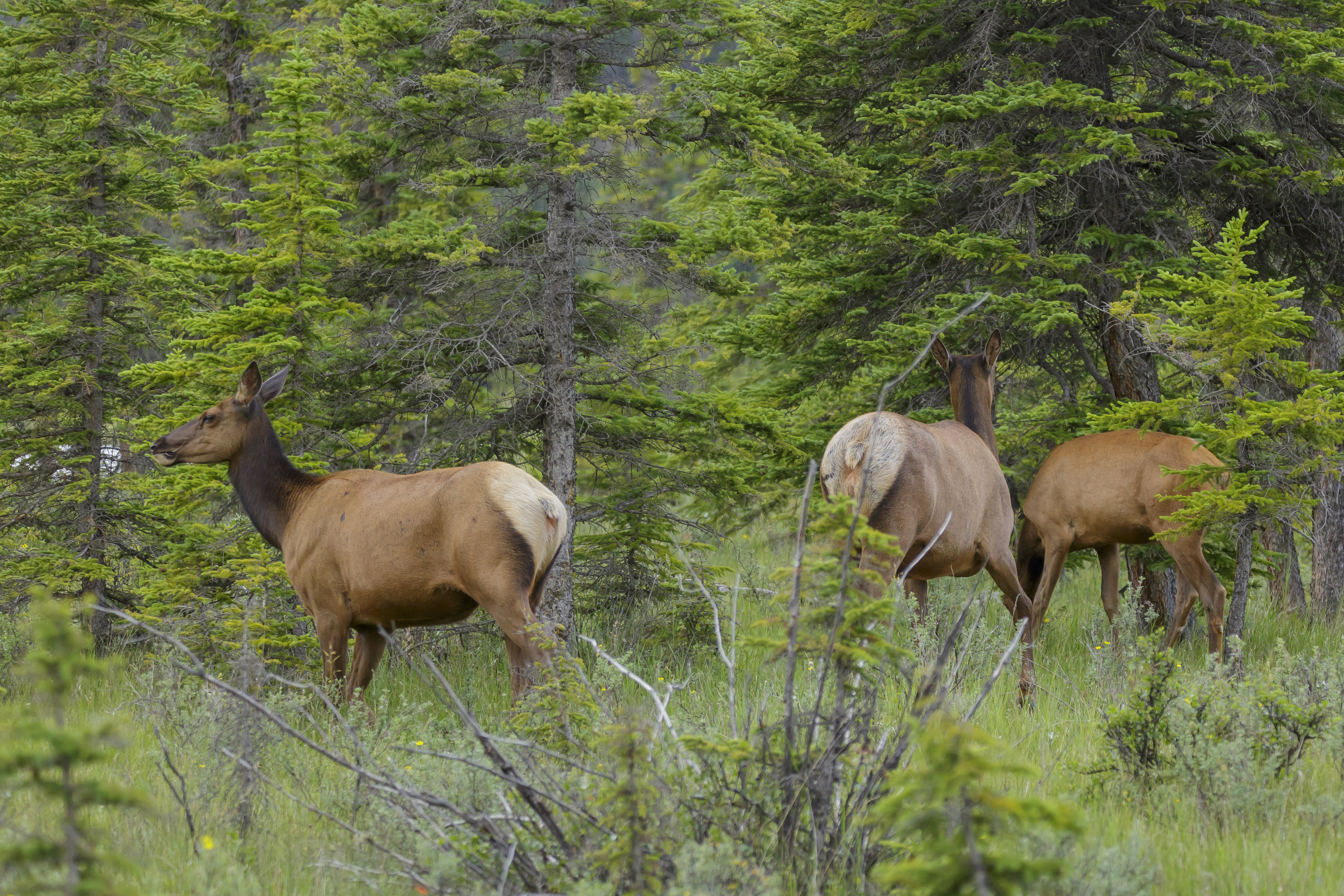
Rocky Mountain Elk

Aiken Canyon Preserve provides habitat for numerous wildlife in its surrounding vicinities. Such includes black bear, mule deer, Rocky Mountain elk, mountain lions, bobcats, grey foxes, badgers and tuft-eared pine squirrels as well as over 100 species of birds such including the common Poorwill, Cordilleran Flycatcher, Juniper Titmouse, Verginias Warbler, MacGillivrays Warbler and the Western Tanager. There are also known hunting birds in the area such as sharp-shinned hawks, cooper's hawks, northern harriers, prairie falcons and golden eagles. Among the common species known in the area include the estimated habitat for the endangered Mexican Spotted Owl as well as the natural heritage of two species of butterfly Dusted skipper and the Simius roadside skipper which rely on the Aiken canyon medium to tall grasslands for survival due to their preferred host plant, the big bluestem.

=== Environmental threats ===
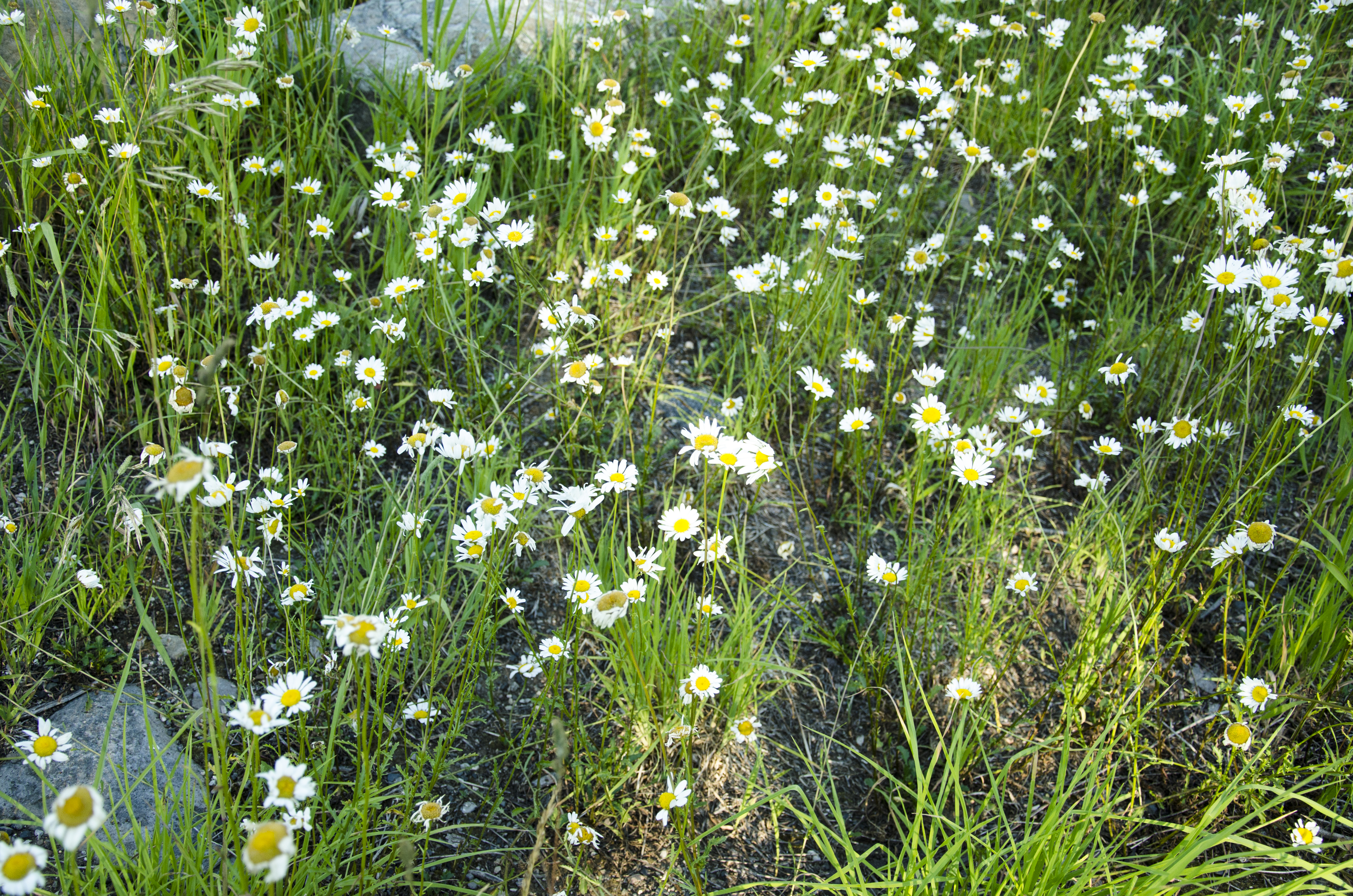
Noxious weed plant

The main threat to the flora ecosystem at Aiken canyon preserve is invasive noxious weed overgrowth. Such effects have been shown that noxious weeds are capable of overwhelming native plants by tactics such as overshadowing for sunlight, consuming more nutrition from water and soil as well as accelerated growth in comparison. Efforts such as environmental management programs have been put into place by the conservatory to minimise such effects on the land and ecosystem. Examples of these programs are seen in a weed extraction handbook from the conservancy where recommendations include manual approaches such as pulling or stabbing and more mechanical processes such as flooding, tilling, soil solarization, mulching and girdling.

Threats towards the fauna life in Aiken Canyon Preserve include cowbird parasitism, habitat disturbance and possible development conflicts from surrounding areas. Cowbird parasitism is a main threat to the bird species within the canyon area as the chicks are known to roll or push out the other bird eggs which decreases the native bird population. Habitat disturbance is a threat to the preserve as its adjacent land and private land within the canyon are still possible for construction development. An example of this threat was the recent proposal of a Quarry site in the El Paso County area in 2016 which would have damaged Aiken Canyon Preserve and surrounding areas on the Front Range as it would have been at the bottom of the site. This proposal was then denied in 2018 by the state board as the construction would have effected the clean drinking water in the area. The Nature Conservancy is trying to develop a conservation outline to work with current private property owners to reduce future environmental threats.

== Weather ==
During a 20-year observational research period between 1978 and 1998, it was found that average daily precipitation rate was at 44 mm (1.7 in) which was half the average of surrounding mountain ranges. The daily average measured temperature within the month of June was at 18.4 °C (65.1 °F) with a range of difference of 0.1 °C. The pollen count within the Aiken Canyon region was found to be on average 16,622 grains within a range of difference to be 1142 grains.
