= Charles Aiken =

Charles Aiken may refer to:

- Charles Augustus Aiken (1827–1892), American clergyman and academic
- Charles Avery Aiken (1872–1965), American painter and watercolorist
- Charles E. H. Aiken (1850–1936), American naturalist and ornithologist
- C. J. Aiken (born 1990), American basketball player
