= Indian millet =

Indian millet is a name widely used in different parts of the world to describe a number of different plants. A possibly incomplete list is:

- Sorghum bicolor (synonym: Sorghum vulgare)
- Oryzopsis hymenoides (synonyms: Achnatherum hymenoides, Stipa hymenoides)
- Panicum miliaceum
- Penicillaria spicata

All of these are members of the family Poaceae and they are either fodder- or grain-producing plants.
