= Penicillium desertorum =

Scientific classification
- Kingdom: Fungi
- Division: Ascomycota
- Class: Eurotiomycetes
- Order: Eurotiales
- Family: Aspergillaceae
- Genus: Penicillium
- Species: P. desertorum

Binomial name
- Penicillium desertorum Frisvad, Houbraken & Samson 2012

Species of fungus

Penicillium desertorum is a species of the genus of Penicillium which was isolated from desert soil under the plant Oryzopsis hymenoides in Wyoming in the US.

== See also ==
- List of Penicillium species
