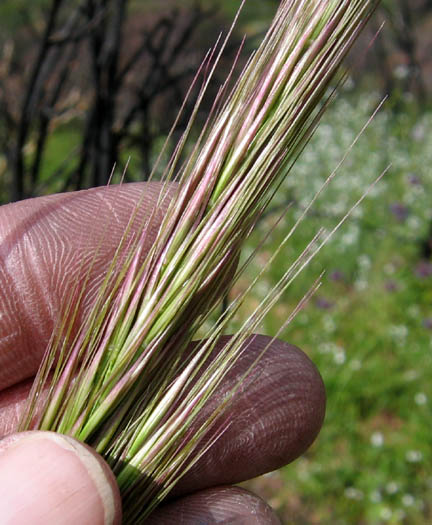

Scientific classification
- Kingdom: Plantae
- Clade: Tracheophytes
- Clade: Angiosperms
- Clade: Monocots
- Clade: Commelinids
- Order: Poales
- Family: Poaceae
- Subfamily: Pooideae
- Genus: Eriocoma
- Species: E. coronata

Binomial name
- Eriocoma coronata (Thurb.) Romasch. (2019)

Synonyms
- Achnatherum coronatum (Thurb.) Barkworth (1993); Stipa coronata Thurb. (1880)

= Eriocoma coronata =

Species of flowering plant

Eriocoma coronata, formerly classified as Achnatherum coronatum, is a greenish species of grass known by the common name crested needlegrass, giant ricegrass, and giant stipa.

== Distribution ==
The grass is native to southern California and Baja California, where it grows on the coastal and inland hills, often in chaparral, oak woodland, and yellow pine forest plant communities. It grows from sea level to 5,000 feet (1,500 m) in elevation. Eriocoma coronata is found in the Peninsular Ranges, Transverse Ranges, southern Outer California Coast Ranges, and the Channel Islands.

== Description ==
Eriocoma coronata is a perennial grass forming loose bunches up to about 2 metres (6.6 ft) in maximum height, but usually shorter. The clumps expand by short rhizomes. This species is similar to its inland relative, Eriocoma parishii, and occasionally the two intergrade in characteristics and are easily confused.

The grass bears a generous inflorescence up to 60 centimeters long with large spikelets up to 2 centimeters long each, not including an awn of up to 4.5 centimeters. The awn has two distinct kinks.

== See also ==
- California chaparral and woodlands
  - California coastal sage and chaparral
  - California montane chaparral and woodlands
  - California oak woodland
- Native grasses of California
