= Achnatherum roshevitzii =

Roshevich's achnatherum

Conservation status
- Vulnerable (IUCN 3.1)

Scientific classification
- Kingdom: Plantae
- Clade: Tracheophytes
- Clade: Angiosperms
- Clade: Monocots
- Clade: Commelinids
- Order: Poales
- Family: Poaceae
- Subfamily: Pooideae
- Genus: Achnatherum
- Species: A. roshevitzii

Binomial name
- Achnatherum roshevitzii Mussajev

Species of grass

Achnatherum roshevitzii (Roshevich's achnatherum) is a species of grass that is endemic to Azerbaijan, and is only known from the Quba District. It occurs on sandy grasslands in lower montane areas. This species is threatened by overgrazing and hay making activities, and there are no conservation measures in place.
