= Montina =

Montina was a brand name of flour created from milled Indian ricegrass (Achnatherum hymenoides), a type of grass native to the western United States. Indian rice grass was grown and used by Native Americans as much as 7,000 years ago. The grass is not related to rice, and the flour is gluten-free.

Indian ricegrass was grown by local farmers and processed at individually owned and dedicated gluten-free plants. Its development coincided with a national interest in diverse flour types in the early 2000s. The majority of farms producing Montina in the United States used non GMOs in the growing of the ricegrass or in the processing of Montina.

As of around 2016, Montina was no longer being sold in stores, and the few mills producing it had closed. Its future use in American cuisine is unknown, as other grains such as wheat and rye still greatly outperform native grains in much of the United States.
