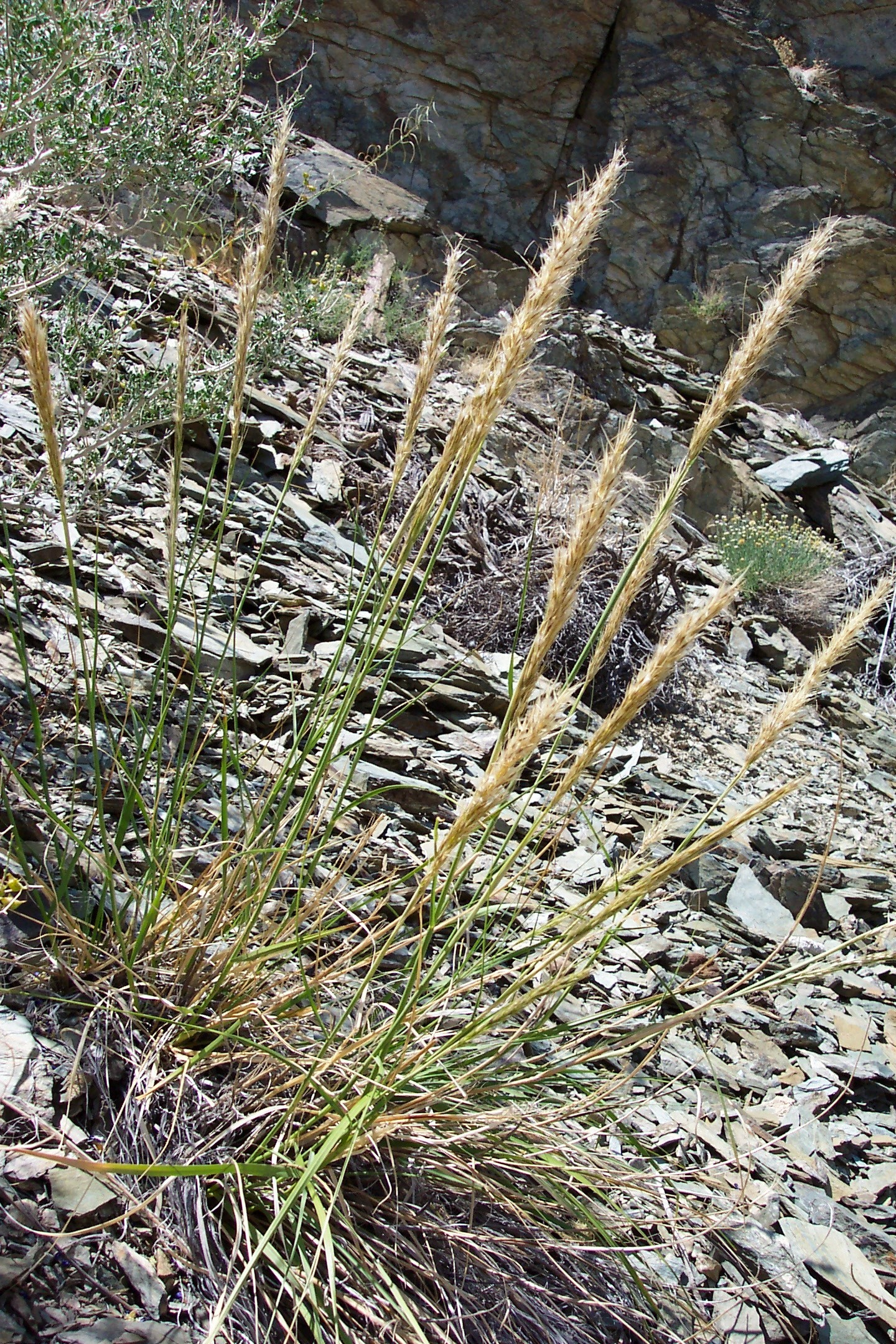
- Eriocoma parishii

Scientific classification
- Kingdom: Plantae
- Clade: Tracheophytes
- Clade: Angiosperms
- Clade: Monocots
- Clade: Commelinids
- Order: Poales
- Family: Poaceae
- Subfamily: Pooideae
- Supertribe: Stipodae
- Tribe: Stipeae
- Genus: Eriocoma; Nutt. (1818)

Species
- 27; see text

Synonyms
- Fendleria Steud. (1854)

= Eriocoma =

Genus of plants

Eriocoma is a genus of plants in the grass family (Poaceae). It includes 27 species of grasses native to western and central North America. Species range from Alaska through western and central Canada, western and central United States, to northern Mexico.

== Species ==
27 species are currently accepted:

- Eriocoma alta (Swallen) Romasch. – northeastern Mexico
- Eriocoma arida (M.E.Jones) Romasch. – southwestern United States and northeastern Mexico
- Eriocoma arnowiae (S.L.Welsh & N.D.Atwood) Romasch. – Utah
- Eriocoma × bloomeri (Bol.) Romasch. – western United States
- Eriocoma bracteata (Swallen) Romasch. – northwestern Mexico
- Eriocoma contracta (B.L.Johnson) Romasch. – Montana, Wyoming, Colorado
- Eriocoma coronata (Thurb.) Romasch. – California and northwestern Mexico
- Eriocoma curvifolia (Swallen) Romasch. – New Mexico, Texas, and northeastern Mexico
- Eriocoma hendersonii (Vasey) Romasch. – Washington, Oregon, and Idaho
- Eriocoma hymenoides (Roem. & Schult.) Rydb. – Yukon through western and central Canada, western and central United States, and northern Mexico
- Eriocoma latiglumis (Swallen) Romasch. – central California
- Eriocoma lemmonii (Vasey) Romasch. – British Columbia and western United States
- Eriocoma lettermanii (Vasey) Romasch. – western United States
- Eriocoma lobata (Swallen) Romasch. – southeastern Arizona to western Texas and northeastern Mexico
- Eriocoma nelsonii (Scribn.) Romasch. – Yukon to western Canada and western and central United States
- Eriocoma nevadensis (B.L.Johnson) Romasch. – western United States (California and Oregon to Wyoming and Colorado)
- Eriocoma occidentalis (Thurb. ex S.Watson) Romasch. – western Canada, western United States, and northeastern Mexico
- Eriocoma parishii (Vasey) Romasch. – southwestern United States and northeastern Mexico
- Eriocoma perplexa (Hoge & Barkworth) Romasch. – Utah, Colorado, Arizona, New Mexico, Texas, and northeastern Mexico
- Eriocoma pinetorum (M.E.Jones) Romasch. – western United States
- Eriocoma richardsonii (Link) Romasch. – Alaska through western and central Canada to Washington, Colorado, and South Dakota
- Eriocoma robusta (Vasey) Romasch. – Wyoming and South Dakota to northeastern Mexico
- Eriocoma scribneri (Vasey) Romasch. – Wyoming, Colorado, New Mexico, Oklahoma, and Texas
- Eriocoma swallenii (C.L.Hitchc. & Spellenb.) Romasch. – Idaho and western Wyoming
- Eriocoma thurberiana (Piper) Romasch. – western United States
- Eriocoma valdesii Hoge ex Romasch., P.M.Peterson & Soreng – northeastern Mexico
- Eriocoma wallowaensis (J.R.Maze & K.A.Robson) Romasch. – Oregon
- Eriocoma webberi Thurb. – western United States (Oregon and California to Colorado) and South Dakota
