= Charles Avery Aiken =

American painter

Charles Avery Aiken

Charles Avery Aiken (29 September 1872 in Georgia, Vermont – 1965) was an American painter, and watercolorist.

== Life ==
He studied at the School of the Museum of Fine Arts, Boston.

He exhibited at the Corcoran Gallery of Art, and at the National Academy of Design. He had a studio in New York City and in Wellesley, Massachusetts. He was Director of the Allied Artists of America.

His work is in the Brooklyn Museum, the National Museum of American History, and the Dallas Museum of Art. His papers are held at the Archives of American Art.
