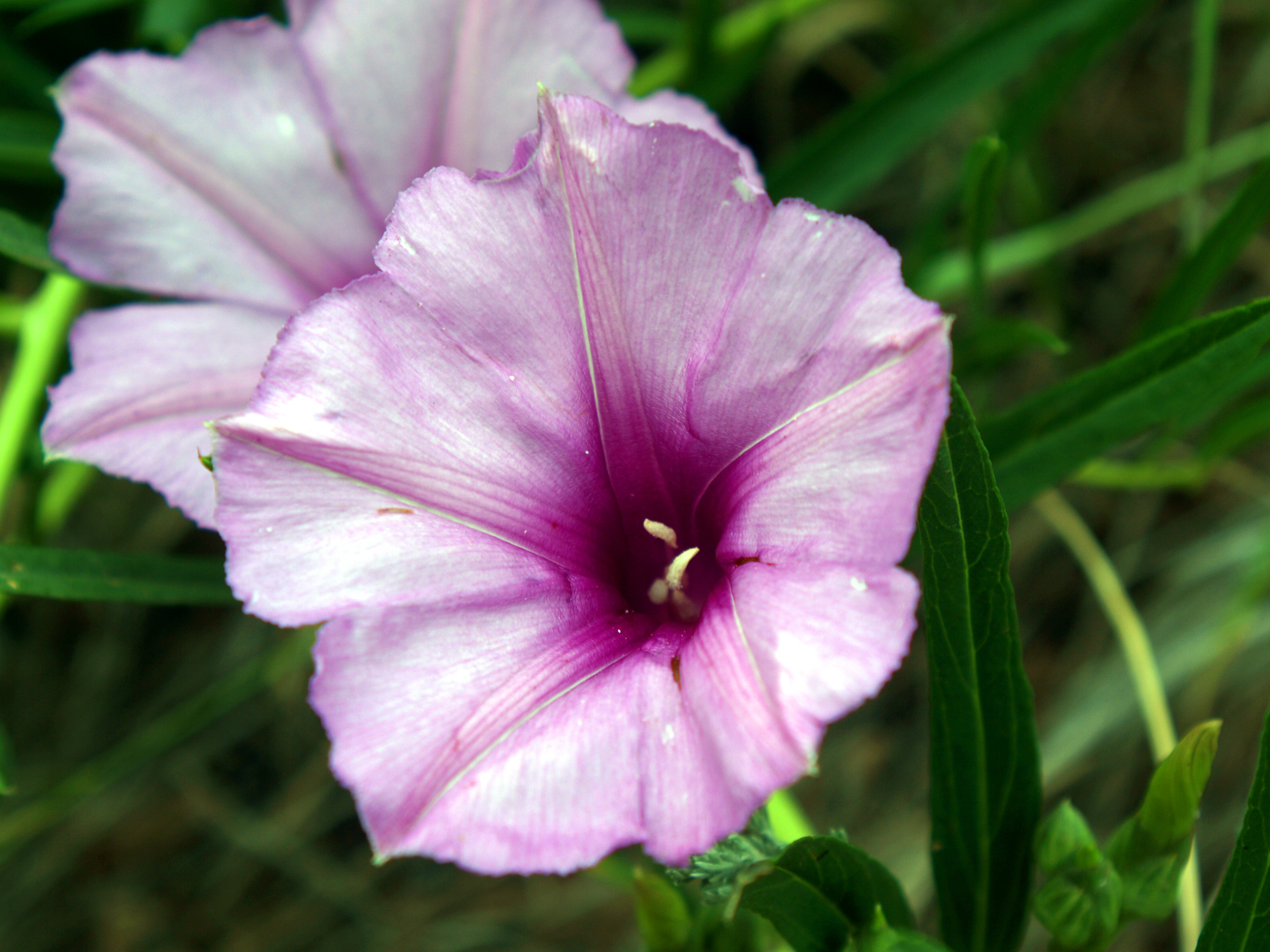

Conservation status
- Apparently Secure (NatureServe)

Scientific classification
- Kingdom: Plantae
- Clade: Tracheophytes
- Clade: Angiosperms
- Clade: Eudicots
- Clade: Asterids
- Order: Solanales
- Family: Convolvulaceae
- Genus: Ipomoea
- Species: I. leptophylla

Binomial name
- Ipomoea leptophylla Torr.

= Ipomoea leptophylla =

Species of flowering plant

Ipomoea leptophylla, the bush morning glory, bush moonflower or manroot, is a species of flowering plant in the bindweed family, Convolvulaceae.

It belongs to the morning glory genus Ipomoea and is native to the Great Plains of western North America. It has a large Tuber.

The Latin specific epithet leptophylla means "fine- or slender-leaved."

== Description ==
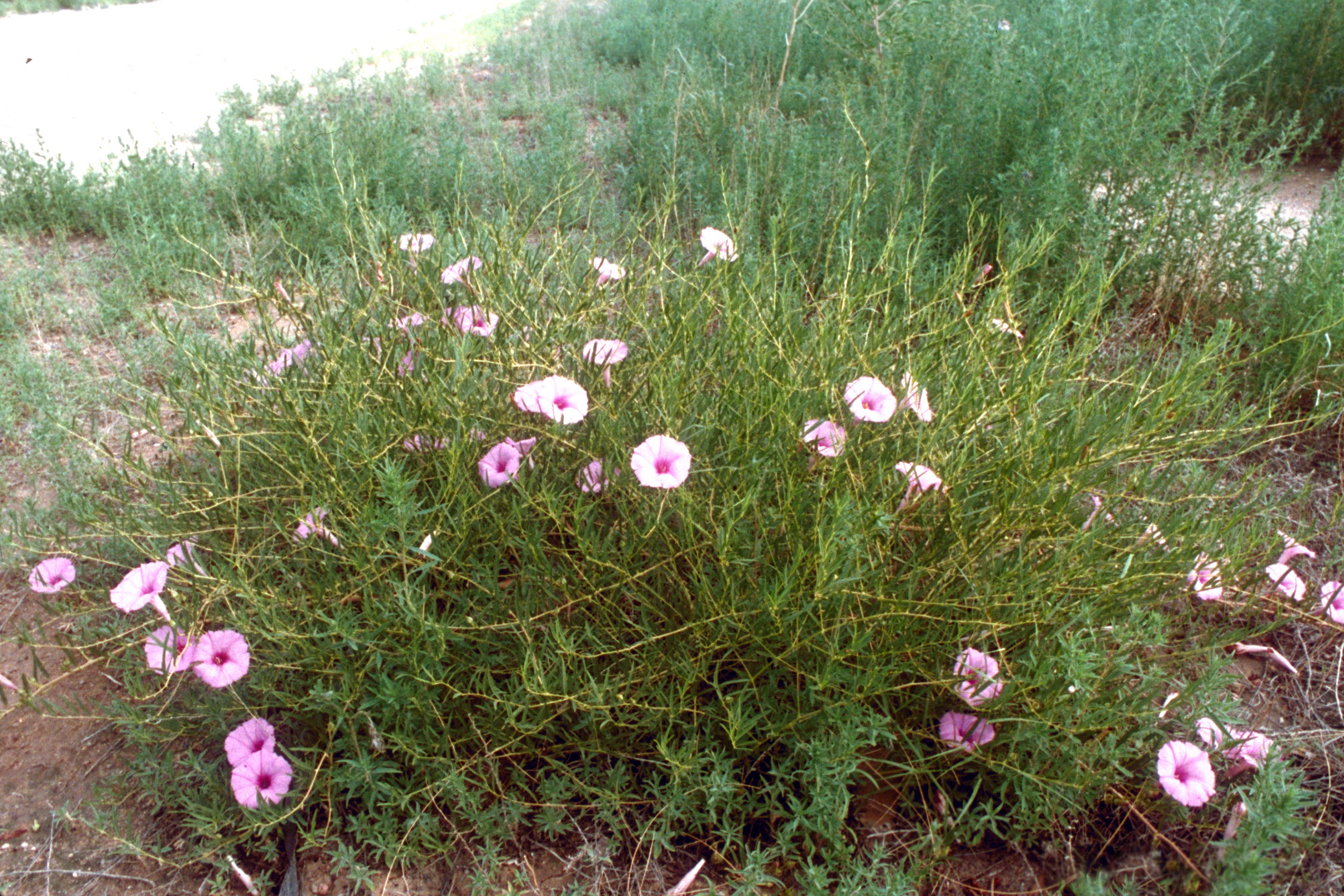
Ipomoea leptophylla

Ipomoea leptophylla is a long lived herbaceous plant. All parts of the plant are killed by the first frost and new shoots in the spring delay emergence until quite late. The plant grows a large spindle shaped tuber that is found at least 50 centimeters under the soil surface, this tuber can be 50 centimeters in diameter and weigh as much as 6 kilograms. From the top of the tuber as many as six stems will emerge within the same quarter of a square meter. The stems are smooth in texture without hairs and may stand straight up or trail a short distance on the ground and about one meter in length. The leaves are narrow and have smooth edges without teeth and come to a sharp point.

The flowering period of Ipomoea leptophylla can be from May to July. The flowers are large, funnel shaped, and purple to pink in color. One to four flowers will be attached together by short stems (pedicels) to each flowering stem (peduncle). The diameter of the flowers is 4.5–7 cm and the length of the tube is 5.5–7 cm long. There are extra floral nectaries located at base of the pedicels.

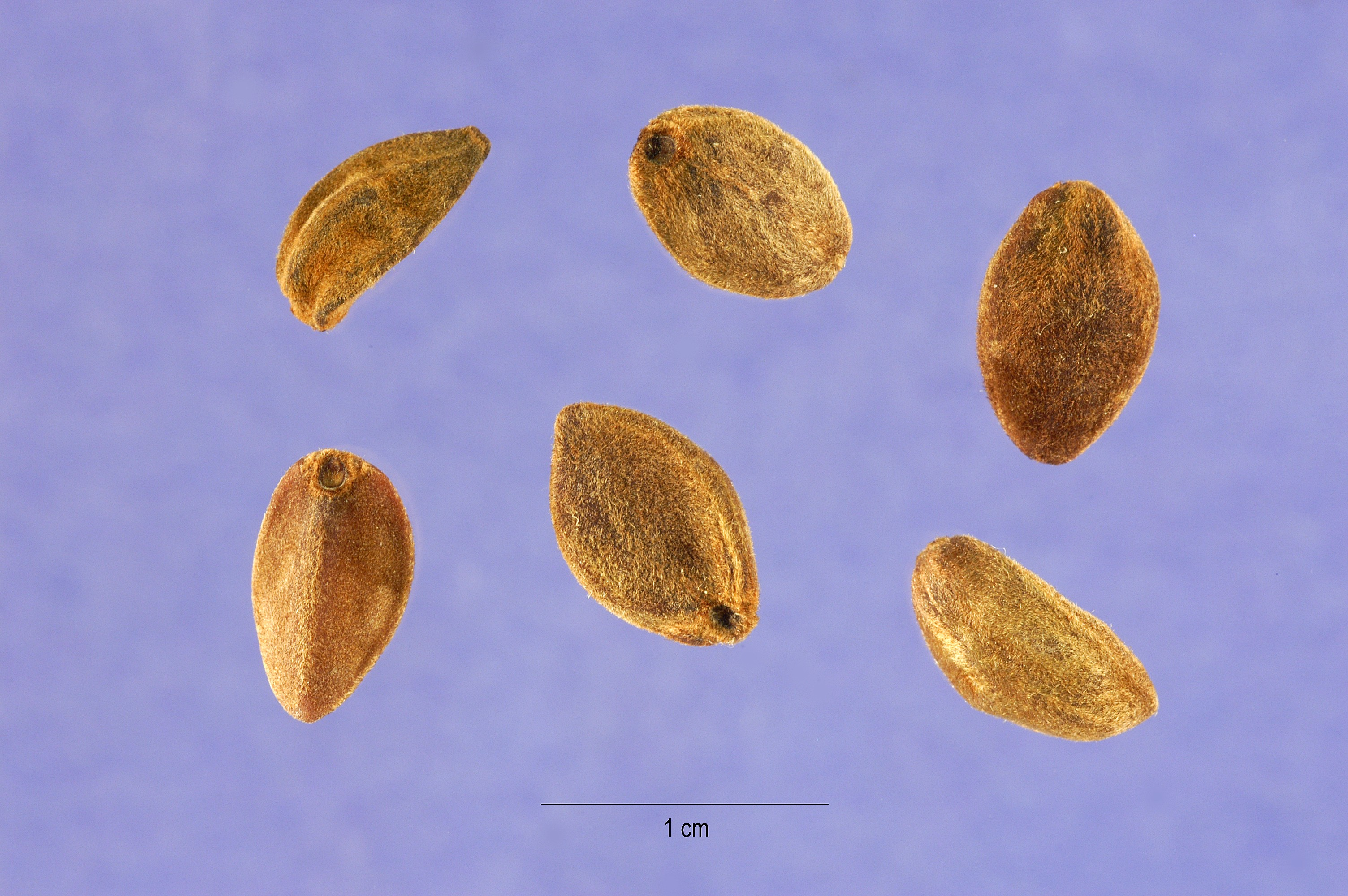
Ipomoea leptophylla seeds

The seeds are large, each weighing up to 0.1 gram and have a fine downy surface. They are oblong and measure 10 mm long and 4 mm wide.

== Habitat and range ==
Ipomoea leptophylla grows in sandy locations in the American great plains and is the only widespread prairie species in genus Ipomoea, though others are adapted to grassland habitats.

They are found from Texas in the south throughout the plains states to South Dakota and Montana in the north.

== Cultivation ==
The bush morning glory is occasionally grown in xeric or native plant gardens for its ample supply of flowers and long blooming season. Plants are generally grown from seed as the large root can only be moved when dormant. Seeds require cold, moist stratification or to be mechanically nicked or filed and then soaked overnight in water before they will germinate. As with the plants seedlings will only emerge once the soil is very warm and will be killed by any frost.
