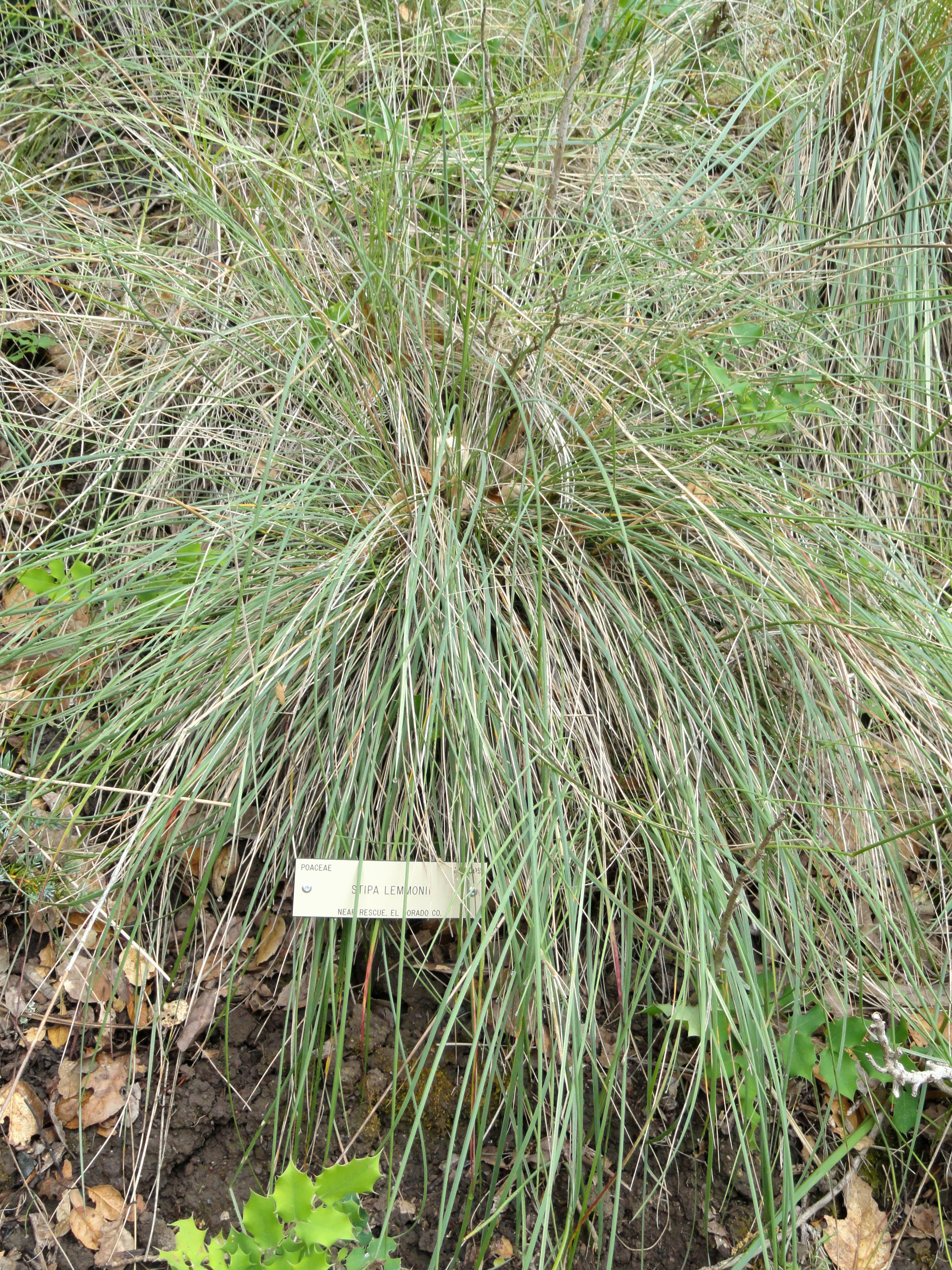

Conservation status
- Secure (NatureServe)

Scientific classification
- Kingdom: Plantae
- Clade: Tracheophytes
- Clade: Angiosperms
- Clade: Monocots
- Clade: Commelinids
- Order: Poales
- Family: Poaceae
- Subfamily: Pooideae
- Genus: Eriocoma
- Species: E. lemmonii

Binomial name
- Eriocoma lemmonii (Vasey) Romasch.

Synonyms
- Achnatherum lemmonii (Vasey) Barkworth; Stipa lemmonii (Vasey) Scribn.

= Eriocoma lemmonii =

Species of grass

Eriocoma lemmonii is a species of grass known by the common name Lemmon's needlegrass. It is native to western North America, where its distribution extends from British Columbia to southern California.

This perennial grass forms a dense clump of stems up to 90 centimetres (35 in) tall. It may be hairless, hairy, or woolly. The inflorescence is a panicle up to 21 centimetres (8.3 in) long by 1 centimeter wide. The spikelets may be over 1 centimetre (0.39 in) long. The awns are up to 3 centimetres (1.2 in) long.

This is a very drought-tolerant grass that can be found in dry areas, such as sunny grasslands and savannas. It can also grow in relatively low-fertility soils. The subspecies pubescens is a serpentine soils endemic.
