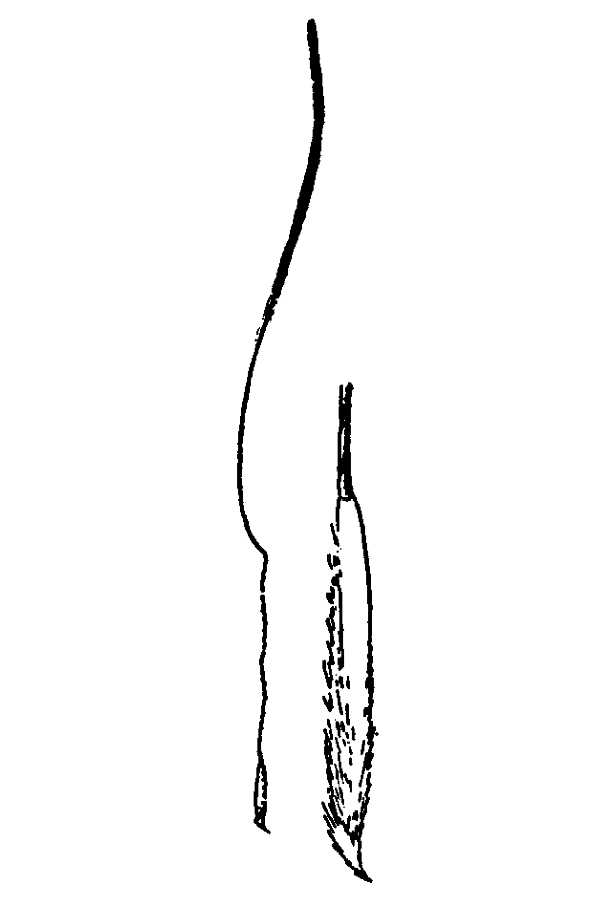

Conservation status
- Secure (NatureServe)

Scientific classification
- Kingdom: Plantae
- Clade: Tracheophytes
- Clade: Angiosperms
- Clade: Monocots
- Clade: Commelinids
- Order: Poales
- Family: Poaceae
- Subfamily: Pooideae
- Genus: Eriocoma
- Species: E. arida

Binomial name
- Eriocoma arida (M.E.Jones) Romasch. (2019)

Synonyms
- Achnatherum aridum (M.E.Jones) Barkworth (1993); Stipa arida M.E.Jones (1895); Stipa mormonum Mez (1921)

= Eriocoma arida =

Species of flowering plant

Eriocoma arida is a species of grass known by the common name Mormon needlegrass. It is native to the southwestern United States and northeastern Mexico.

== Description ==
Eriocoma arida is a tuft-forming perennial bunchgrass without rhizomes. The bunches of stems reach a maximum height of around 85 centimetres (33 in). The inflorescence is a panicle often partly enfolded in the narrow sheath of the uppermost leaf. The spikelets have hairlike awns 4–8 centimetres (1.6–3.1 in) long.

== Range and habitat ==
Eriocoma arida ranges across the southwestern United States, from California's Mojave Desert through Nevada, Arizona, Utah, Colorado, and New Mexico to Texas, and in the states of Nuevo León and Hidalgo in northeastern Mexico.

It is a resident of high desert scrub and woodland habitat at some elevation.
