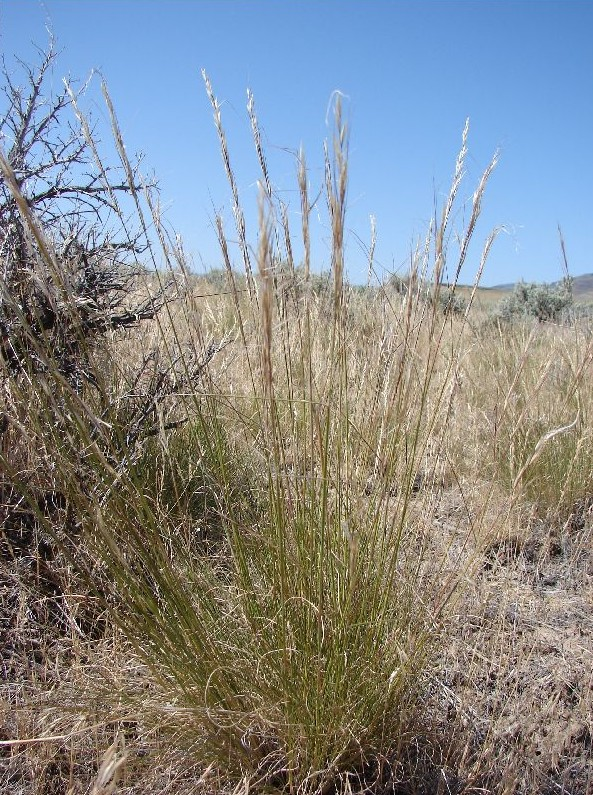

Conservation status
- Secure (NatureServe)

Scientific classification
- Kingdom: Plantae
- Clade: Tracheophytes
- Clade: Angiosperms
- Clade: Monocots
- Clade: Commelinids
- Order: Poales
- Family: Poaceae
- Subfamily: Pooideae
- Genus: Eriocoma
- Species: E. thurberiana

Binomial name
- Eriocoma thurberiana (Piper) Romasch. (2019)

Synonyms
- Achnatherum thurberianum (Piper) Barkworth (1993); Stipa occidentalis Thurb. (1874), nom. illeg.; Stipa thurberiana Piper (1900)

= Eriocoma thurberiana =

Species of flowering plant

Eriocoma thurberiana is a species of grass known by the common name Thurber's needlegrass. It is native to the western United States, where it occurs from Washington to California and east to Montana and Wyoming.

This is a tufted perennial grass with erect stems reaching about 75 centimeters in maximum height. The tuft of stems may be circular in shape as the stems in the center die first. The inflorescence is a narrow panicle up to 15 centimeters long by 2.5 wide. The spikelet has a sharp tip and a long, hairy awn which may exceed 5 to 10 centimeters in length.

This is a common grass in many plant communities in the Pacific Northwest and Great Basin in the US. It is a dominant species in many areas, and may grow alongside other common grasses such as bluebunch wheatgrass (Pseudoroegneria spicata), Idaho fescue (Festuca idahoensis), and needle-and-thread grass (Hesperostipa comata). It can be found in sagebrush and pinyon-juniper woodland. It is a climax species, occurring in undisturbed plant communities.

This grass provides food for livestock and wildlife. It is forage for cattle, sheep, and wild horses. Black-tailed jackrabbits often consume it. Juvenile pronghorn eat the grass when it is young. Many grazing animals avoid the grass when it matures, because the spikelets are sharp and hard. At this point the seeds are consumed by birds and small mammals. Some animals, such as the Sage Grouse, use the grass for cover.
