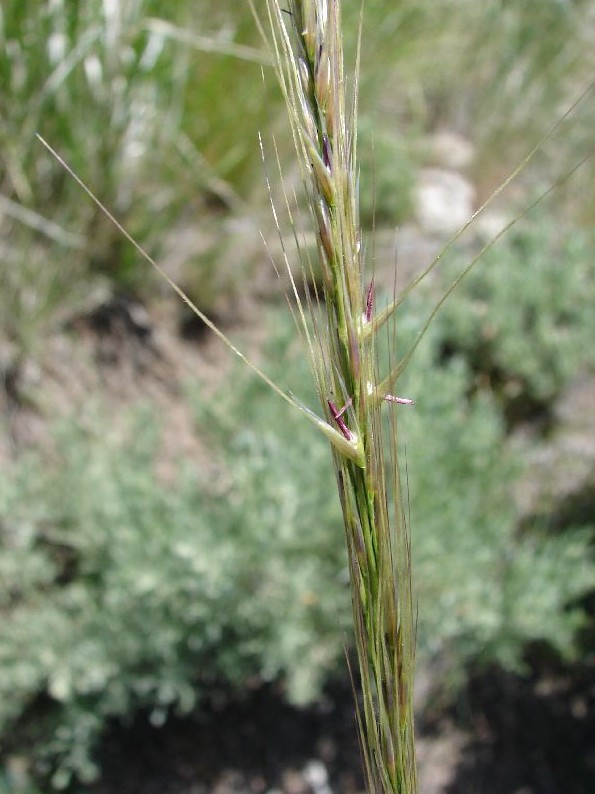

Conservation status
- Secure (NatureServe)

Scientific classification
- Kingdom: Plantae
- Clade: Tracheophytes
- Clade: Angiosperms
- Clade: Monocots
- Clade: Commelinids
- Order: Poales
- Family: Poaceae
- Subfamily: Pooideae
- Genus: Eriocoma
- Species: E. nelsonii

Binomial name
- Eriocoma nelsonii (Scribn.) Romasch. (2019)

Synonyms
- Achnatherum nelsonii (Scribn.) Barkworth (1993); Stipa columbiana subsp. nelsonii (Scribn.) H.St.John (1937); Stipa columbiana var. nelsonii (Scribn.) Hitchc. (1925); Stipa nelsonii Scribn. (1898); Stipa occidentalis var. nelsonii (Scribn.) C.L.Hitchc. (1969)

= Eriocoma nelsonii =

Species of flowering plant

Eriocoma nelsonii is a species of grass known by the common names Columbia needlegrass, subalpine needlegrass, and western needlegrass. It is native to western North America, from Yukon and British Columbia to California to Texas.

This perennial grass grows in leafy clumps up to 175 centimeters tall. The inflorescence is a narrow panicle with branches upright or pressed parallel to the stem. The roots may extend nearly one meter deep into the soil. The grass remains green throughout much of the season, sometimes until the first snowfall.

This grass occurs in many types of habitat in western North America. It is a dominant grass in a number of regions, such as shrubsteppe in Colorado and forest and woodland ecosystems in Arizona and New Mexico. In some areas, it is an indicator of climax status in sagebrush and pinyon-juniper woodland. It indicates true dry grassland in northern Alberta and pristine subalpine habitat on the Wasatch Plateau in Utah. In New Mexico it grows back quickly after wildfire. It tolerates heavy grazing, and is one of the last species to be overgrazed and one of the first to recover when overgrazing stops.

Many types of livestock and wildlife feed on the grass, especially when it is immature. As the fruit of the grass develops it becomes hard and pointed and becomes stuck in the mouths and ears of animals; at this point they try to avoid feeding on it.

== Subspecies ==
Two subspecies are accepted:

- Eriocoma nelsonii subsp. dorei (Barkworth & J.R.Maze) Romasch. – Yukon to California, Texas, and South Dakota
- Eriocoma nelsonii subsp. nelsonii – Saskatchewan to Nevada, Arizona, and New Mexico
