= Charles E. H. Aiken =

American naturalist and ornithologist

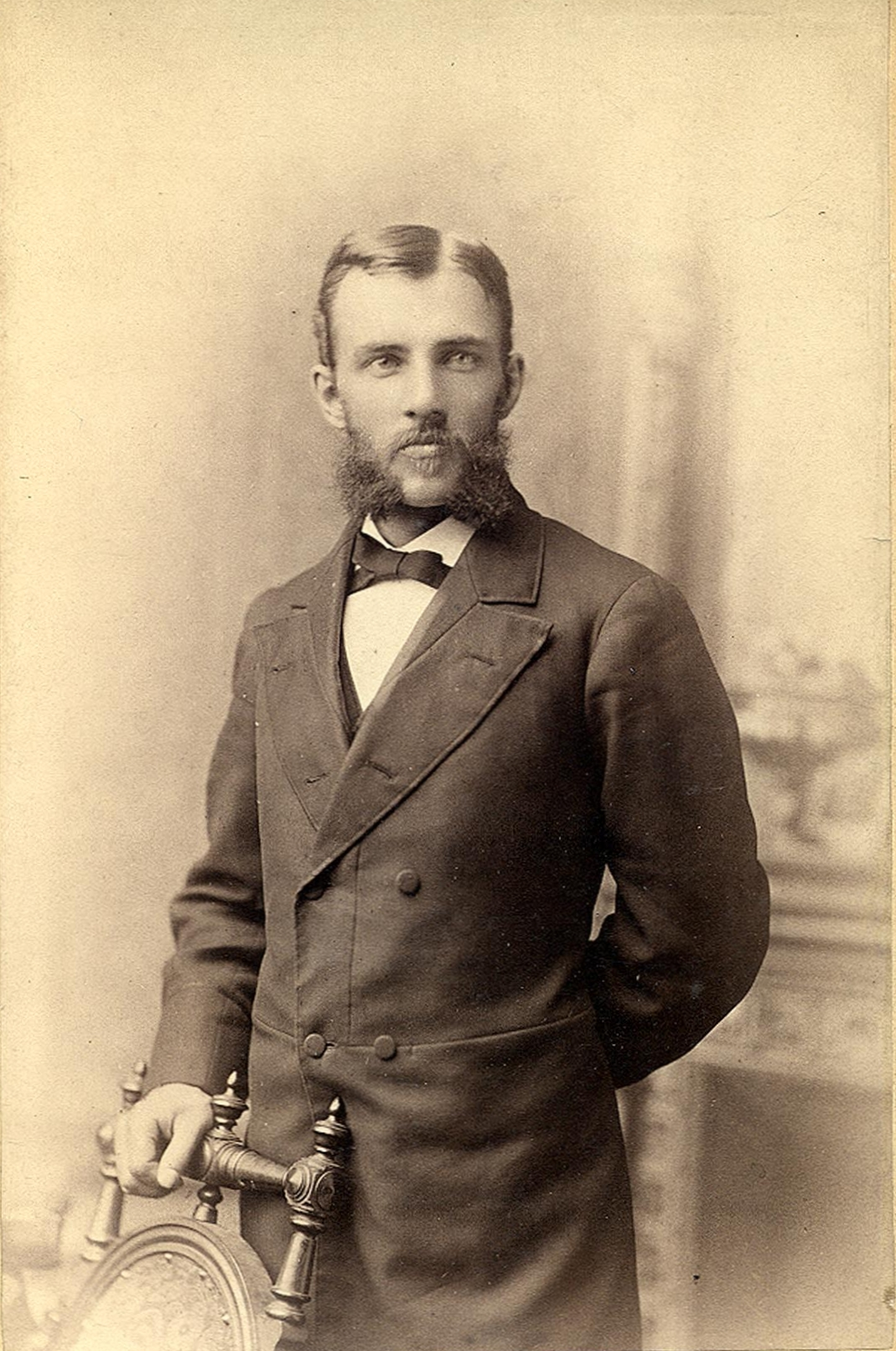
In 1882

Charles Edward Howard Aiken (7 September 1850 – 15 January 1936) was an American naturalist and ornithologist who was among the early ornithologists who studied the birds of Colorado. Lacking a university education, but trained as a skilled specimen preparator, he established a taxidermy business and later a museum. The subspecies Junco hyemalis aikeni and Megascops kennicottii aikeni are named after him.

== Life and work ==
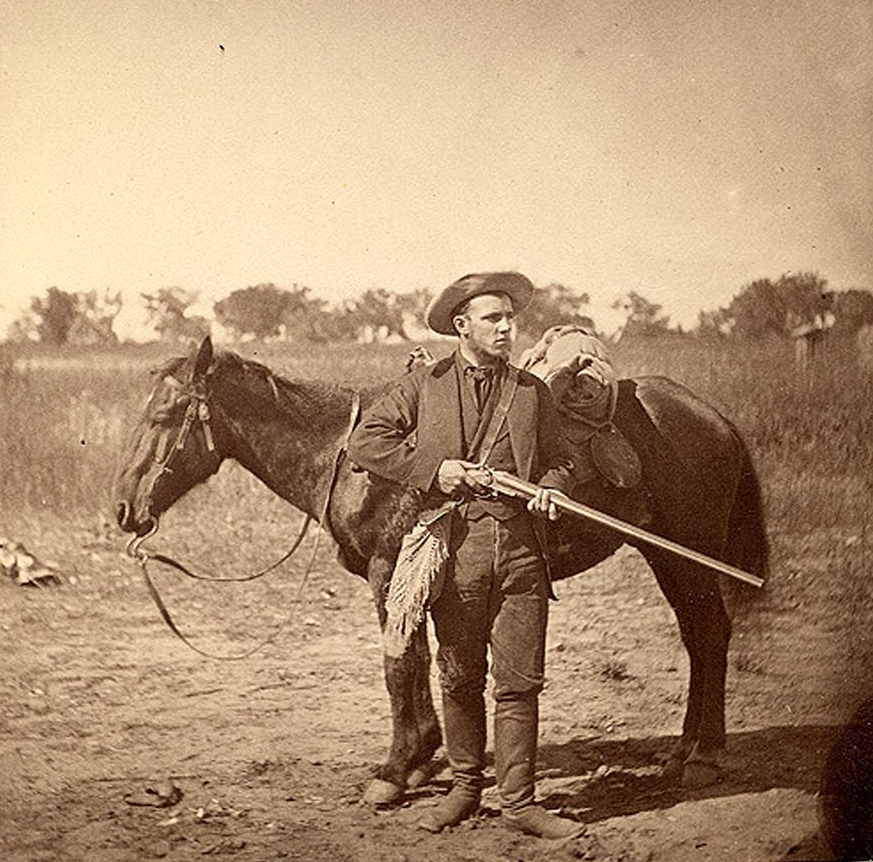
At Pueblo in 1874

Aiken was born in Benson, Vermont, the first son of James Edward and Harriet Ann Howard Aiken. He grew up in Chicago and began to shoot and collect birds from the age of 18. He also began to learn taxidermy under Charlie Holden and Rudolph Borcherdt. The family moved to Colorado Springs following the destruction of his father's business in the Chicago fire of 1871. He lived in the ranch of Turkey Creek Valley now called Aiken Canyon and established a taxidermy business in Colorado Springs around 1877. In 1868 he saw flocks of passenger pigeon in Ross and in 1886 he saw (and attempted to shoot) his last at Hammond, Indiana. In 1875 he trained Frank Stephens in bird taxidermy. Stephens would later help establish the San Diego museum. Aiken was said to have been a keen observer with an ear for bird calls which he could also imitate. In the early 1880s he established C.E. Aiken’s Music Store and Museum on Pikes Peak Avenue. In 1907 he sold off his collections to General William Jackson Palmer who gave it to the Colorado College consisting of about 5700 skins along with mounted specimens, nests and eggs.
