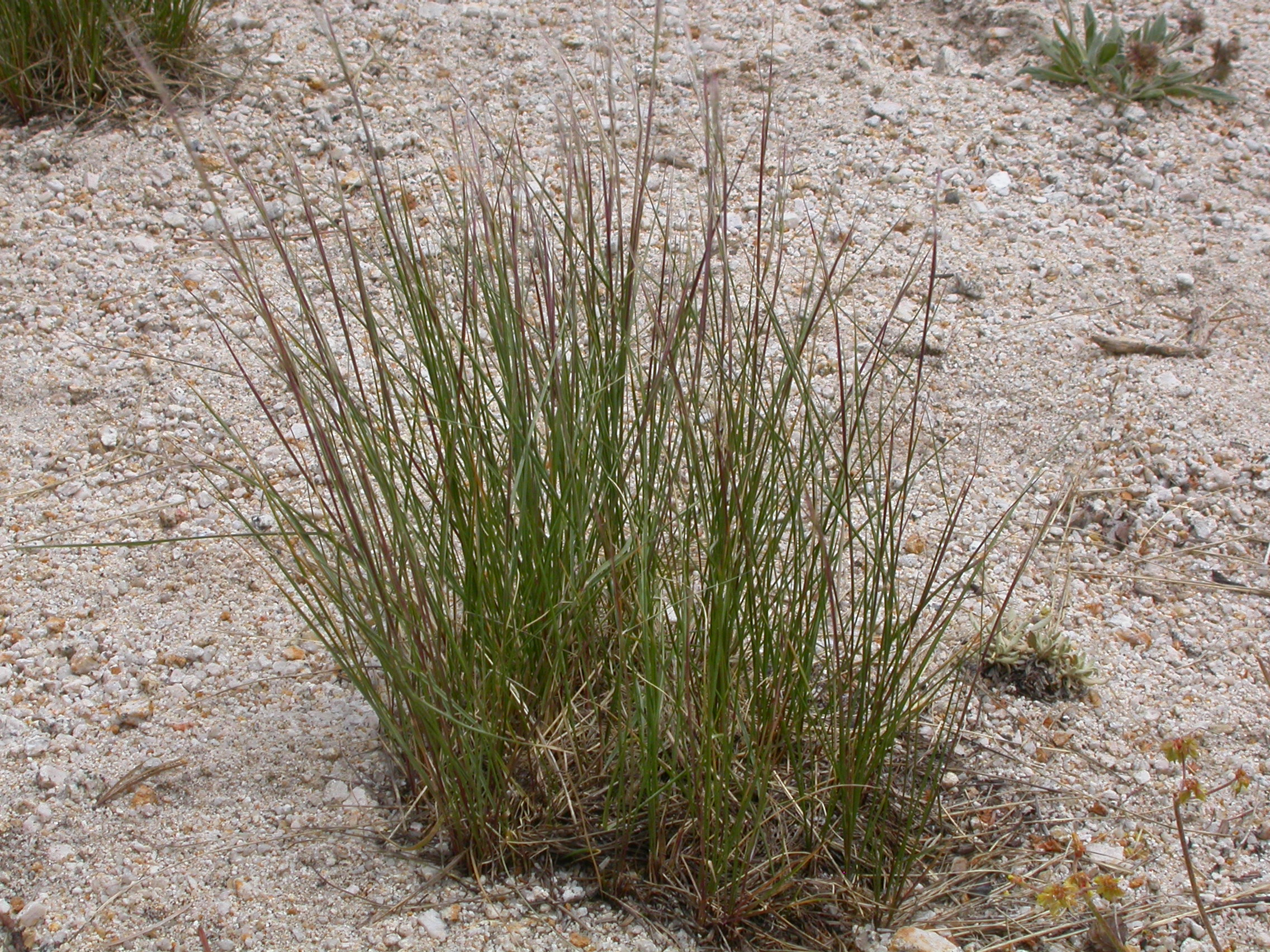

Conservation status
- Secure (NatureServe)

Scientific classification
- Kingdom: Plantae
- Clade: Tracheophytes
- Clade: Angiosperms
- Clade: Monocots
- Clade: Commelinids
- Order: Poales
- Family: Poaceae
- Subfamily: Pooideae
- Genus: Eriocoma
- Species: E. occidentalis

Binomial name
- Eriocoma occidentalis (Thurb. ex S.Watson) Romasch. (2019)

Synonyms
- Achnatherum occidentale (Thurb. ex S.Watson) Barkworth (1993); Stipa occidentalis Thurb. ex S.Watson (1871); Stipa occidentalis var. montana Merr. & Burtt Davy (1902), not validly publ.; Stipa stricta var. sparsiflora Vasey (1892)

= Eriocoma occidentalis =

Species of flowering plant

Eriocoma occidentalis is a species of grass known by the common name western needlegrass. It is native to western North America from British Columbia to California, Colorado, and Arizona and in northeastern Mexico (Chihuahua), where it grows in many types of habitat.

This is a tufting perennial bunchgrass forming tight clumps of erect stems up to about 120 centimetres (47 in) in maximum height, but sometimes much shorter. The hairlike leaves are less than a millimeter wide and may have rolled edges. The inflorescence is up to 30 centimetres (12 in) long, with each hairy spikelet bearing an awn up to 4 or 5 centimeters long. The awn is kinked twice.

== Subspecies ==
Three subspecies are accepted:

- Eriocoma occidentalis subsp. californica (Merr. & Burtt Davy) Romasch. – Washington, Oregon, California, Nevada, Idaho, and Alberta
- Eriocoma occidentalis subsp. occidentalis – California
- Eriocoma occidentalis subsp. pubescens (Vasey) Romasch. – British Columbia and Alberta to California, Arizona, Colorado, and northeastern Mexico (Chihuahua)
