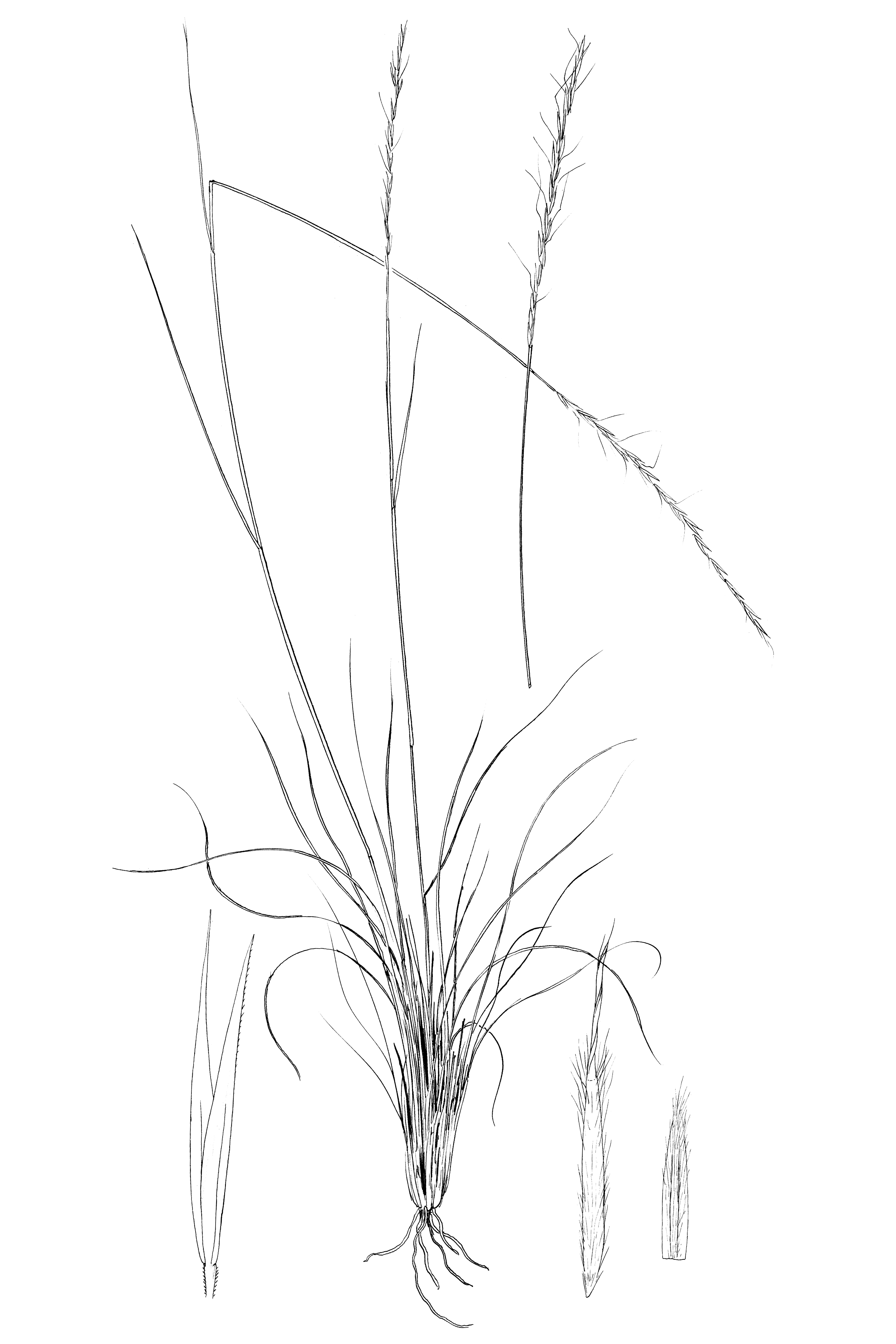

Conservation status
- Secure (NatureServe)

Scientific classification
- Kingdom: Plantae
- Clade: Embryophytes
- Clade: Tracheophytes
- Clade: Angiosperms
- Clade: Monocots
- Clade: Commelinids
- Order: Poales
- Family: Poaceae
- Subfamily: Pooideae
- Genus: Eriocoma
- Species: E. lettermanii

Binomial name
- Eriocoma lettermanii (Vasey) Romasch. (2019)

Synonyms
- Achnatherum lettermanii (Vasey) Barkworth (1993); Stipa lettermanii Vasey (1886); Stipa minor (Vasey) Scribn. (1898); Stipa occidentalis var. minor (Vasey) C.L.Hitchc. (1969); Stipa viridula var. lettermanii (Vasey) Vasey (1893); Stipa viridula var. minor Vasey (1892)

= Eriocoma lettermanii =

Species of flowering plant

Eriocoma lettermanii is a species of grass known by the common name Letterman's needlegrass. It is native to the western United States from California and Oregon to Montana and New Mexico, where it is a resident of several types of habitat.

Eriocoma lettermanii is a tufting perennial bunchgrass which forms large clumps of erect stems up to about 80 centimeters tall. The leaves are short and slightly curly. The inflorescence is up to about 19 centimeters long and has open branches with few spikelets. Each spikelet is less than a centimeter long but has an awn which can be up to about 2.5 centimeters in length. The awn has two kinks.
