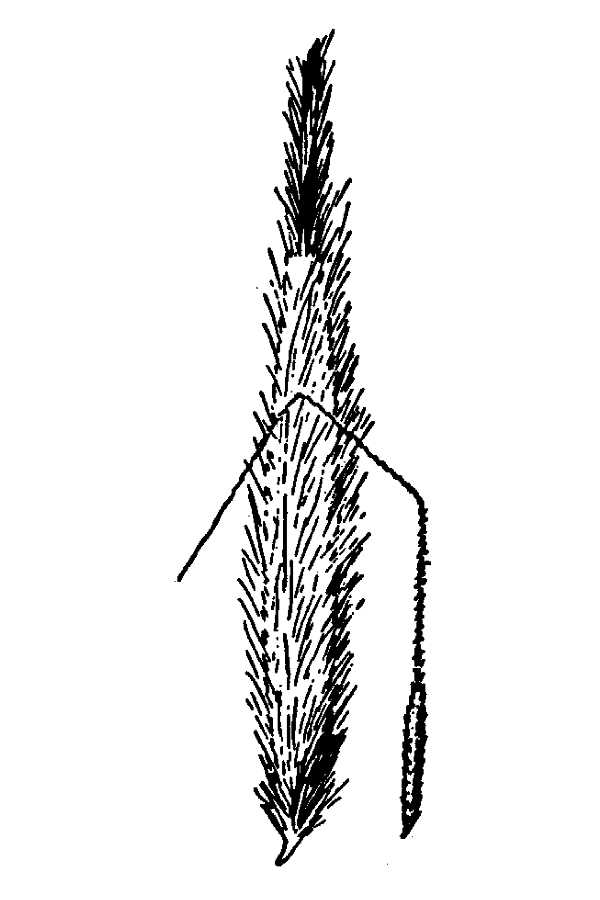

Conservation status
- Apparently Secure (NatureServe)

Scientific classification
- Kingdom: Plantae
- Clade: Tracheophytes
- Clade: Angiosperms
- Clade: Monocots
- Clade: Commelinids
- Order: Poales
- Family: Poaceae
- Subfamily: Pooideae
- Genus: Eriocoma
- Species: E. latiglumis

Binomial name
- Eriocoma latiglumis (Swallen) Romasch. (2019)

Synonyms
- Achnatherum latiglume (Swallen) Barkworth (1993); Stipa latiglumis Swallen (1933)

= Eriocoma latiglumis =

Species of flowering plant

Eriocoma latiglumis is a species of grass known by the common names wide-glumed needlegrass and Sierra needlegrass.

It is a bunchgrass is endemic to montane California, where it grows in the mountain meadows and pine forests of the Sierra Nevada, and in a few areas of the Transverse Ranges to the southwest.

It is also known by the synonyms Stipa latiglumis and Achnatherum latiglume. The Jepson Herbarium calls it Stipa latiglumis.

== Description ==
Eriocoma latiglumis is a perennial bunchgrass forming tight bunches of erect stems up to 110 centimeters tall. It has hairlike leaves under 3 millimeters wide.

The inflorescence is up to about 30 centimeters long. Each hairy spikelet is just over a centimeter long and sharply pointed, with an awn about 4 centimeters long and kinked twice.
