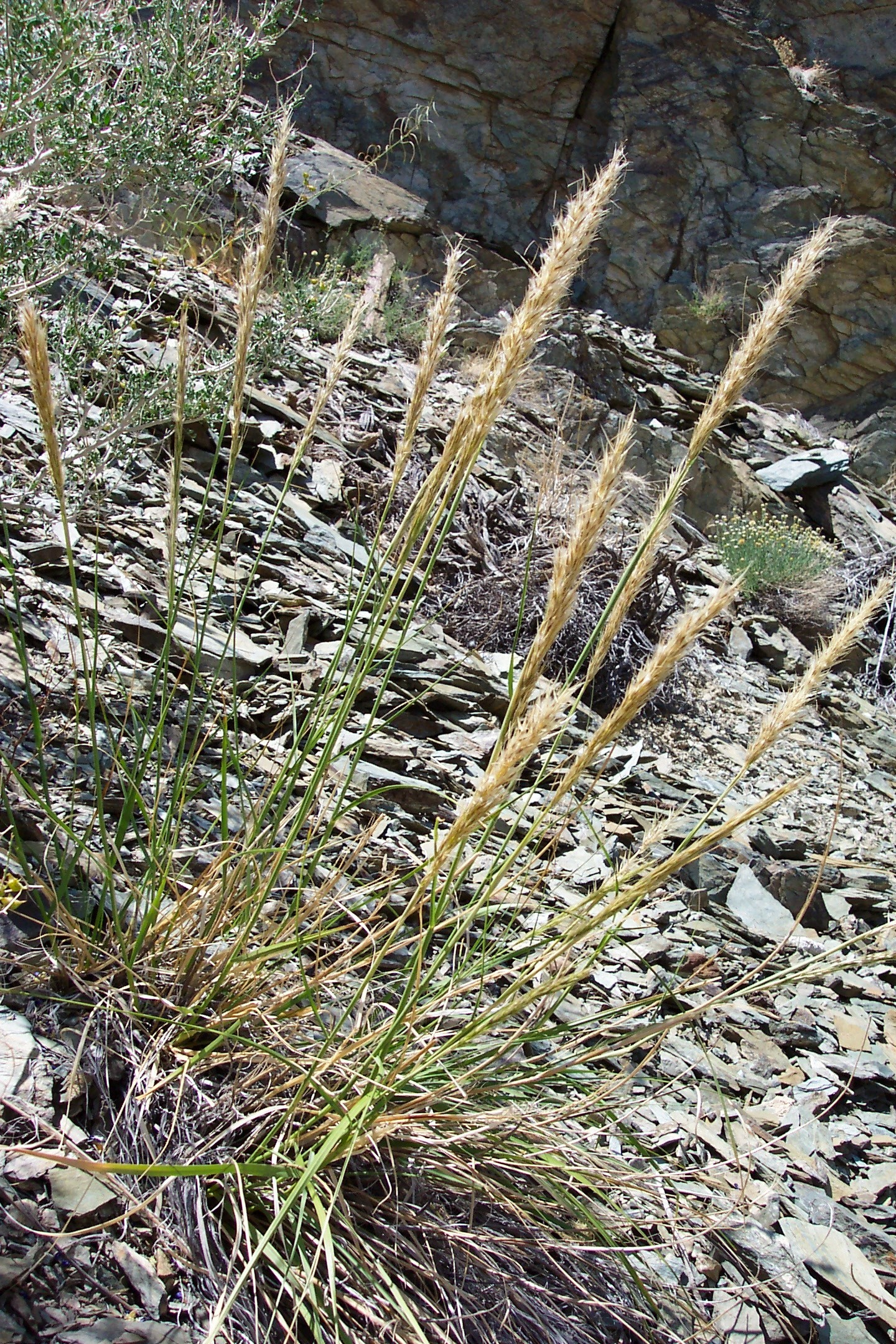

Scientific classification
- Kingdom: Plantae
- Clade: Tracheophytes
- Clade: Angiosperms
- Clade: Monocots
- Clade: Commelinids
- Order: Poales
- Family: Poaceae
- Subfamily: Pooideae
- Genus: Eriocoma
- Species: E. parishii

Binomial name
- Eriocoma parishii (Vasey) Romasch. (2019)

Synonyms
- Achnatherum parishii (Vasey) Barkworth (1993); Stipa coronata var. depauperata (Vasey) Hitchc. (1925); Stipa parishii Vasey (1882)

= Eriocoma parishii =

Species of flowering plant

Eriocoma parishii is a species of grass known by the common name Parish's needlegrass.. It is also known by the synonyms Stipa parishii and Achnatherum parishii. The Jepson Manual 2nd edition (2012) reclassified the plant as Stipa parishii var. parishii.

== Description ==
Stipa parishii is a perennial bunch grass which forms tight tufts of erect stems up to about 80 centimeters tall.

The inflorescence is up to 15 centimeters long and packed with densely hairy spikelets. Each spikelet has an awn up to about 3.5 centimeters long. It has a single kink in it, whereas the awns of many other Stipa species have two kinks.

== Range and habitat ==
The bunchgrass is native to western North America from southern California and Baja California, through Arizona and Nevada, to Utah, where it grows in many types of habitat, especially chaparral and other dry habitats. It is found from 900–2,700 metres (3,000–8,900 ft) in elevation. Locations include the Peninsular Ranges, Mojave Desert sky islands, southern Sierra Nevada and High Sierra, Inyo Mountains, White Mountains, and Great Basin Desert mountains.

== See also ==
- Bunchgrasses of North America
- Native grasses of California
