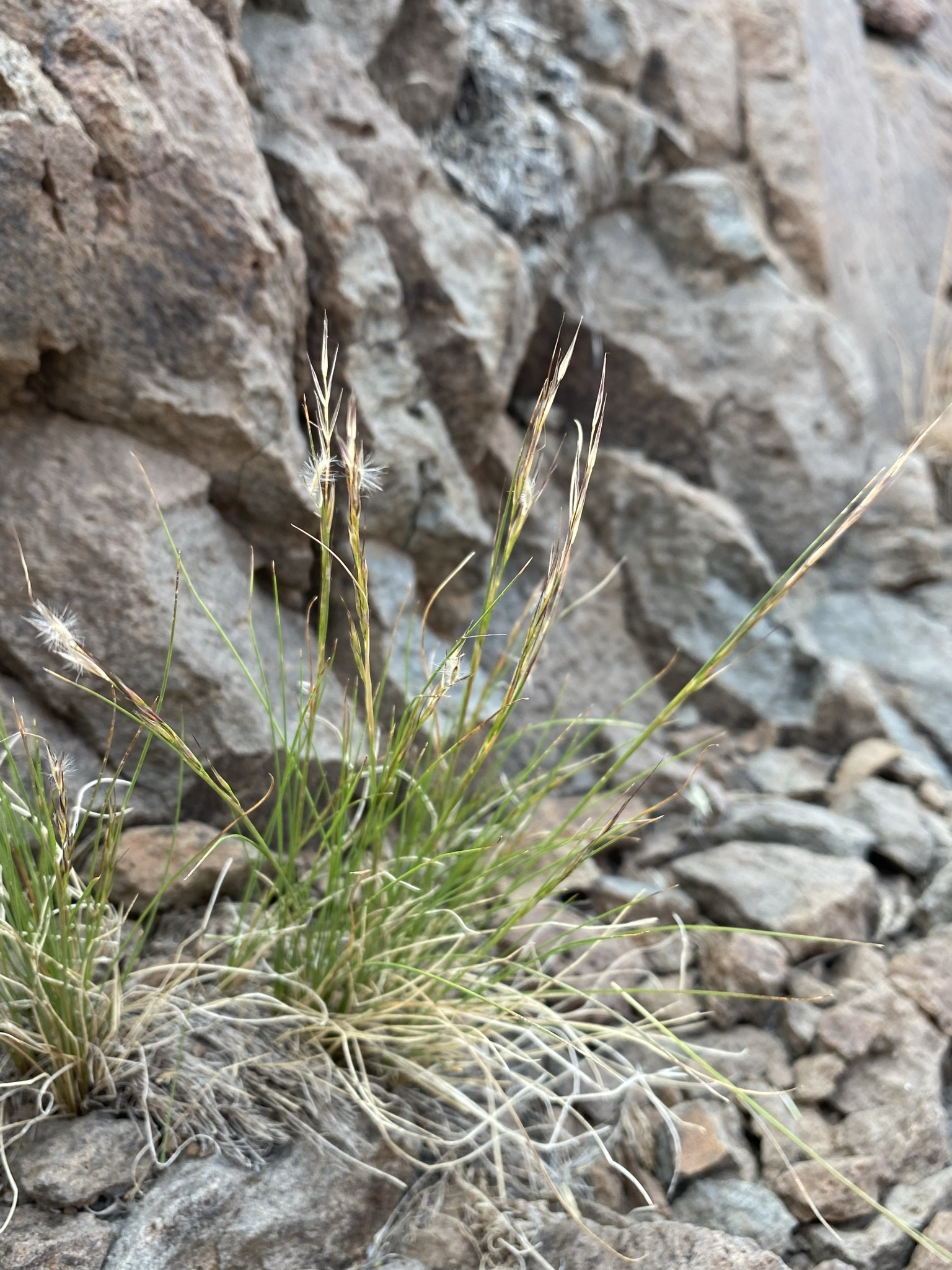

Conservation status
- Apparently Secure (NatureServe)

Scientific classification
- Kingdom: Plantae
- Clade: Tracheophytes
- Clade: Angiosperms
- Clade: Monocots
- Clade: Commelinids
- Order: Poales
- Family: Poaceae
- Subfamily: Pooideae
- Genus: Eriocoma
- Species: E. pinetorum

Binomial name
- Eriocoma pinetorum (M.E.Jones) Romasch.

Synonyms
- Achnatherum pinetorum (M.E.Jones) Barkworth; Stipa pinetorum M.E.Jones

= Eriocoma pinetorum =

Species of flowering plant

Eriocoma pinetorum is a species of grass known by the common names pinewoods needlegrass and pine needlegrass. It is native to most of the western United States from California to Montana to New Mexico, where it grows in woodland and forest in rocky mountainous areas.

== Description ==
Eriocoma pinetorum is a perennial bunchgrass forming tight bunches of erect stems generally between 10 and 50 centimeters tall. The hairlike leaf blades are under a millimeter wide.

The inflorescence is up to about 20 centimetres (7.9 in) long and branched but with the branches running parallel against the main stalk. Each spikelet is coated densely in long hairs and has an awn up to 2.5 centimetres (0.98 in) long with two kinks in it.
