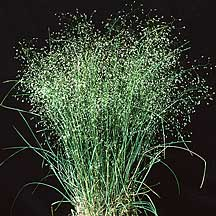
- Flowering bunch

Conservation status
- Secure (NatureServe)

Scientific classification
- Kingdom: Plantae
- Clade: Embryophytes
- Clade: Tracheophytes
- Clade: Spermatophytes
- Clade: Angiosperms
- Clade: Monocots
- Clade: Commelinids
- Order: Poales
- Family: Poaceae
- Subfamily: Pooideae
- Genus: Eriocoma
- Species: E. hymenoides

Binomial name
- Eriocoma hymenoides (Roem. & Schult.) Rydb.

Synonyms
- Synonymy: Oryzopsis hymenoides Ricker ex Piper; Stipa hymenoides Roem. & Schult. (basionym); Eriocoma cuspidata Nutt.; Oryzopsis cuspidata (Nutt.) Benth. ex Vasey; Achnatherum hymenoides (Roem. & Schult.) Barkworth; Eriocoma membranacea (Pursh) Beal 1896 not Steud. 1840; Fendleria rhynchelytroides Steud.; Milium cuspidatum (Nutt.) Spreng.; Oryzopsis membranacea (Pursh) Vasey; Stipa membranacea Pursh; Urachne lanata Trin.

= Eriocoma hymenoides =

Indian ricegrass

Species of flowering plant

Eriocoma hymenoides (common names: Indian ricegrass and sand rice grass) is a cool-season, perennial bunchgrass. It is native to western North America.

== Description ==
In the wild, Eriocoma hymenoides typically grows 10 to 61 centimetres (4 to 24 inches) tall and 20 to 30 cm (8 to 12 in) wide. It has narrow, rolled leaf blades.

== Distribution and habitat ==
Eriocoma hymenoides is native to western North America east of the Cascades from British Columbia and Alberta south to southern California, northeastern Mexico, and Texas.

It grows in a variety of habitats from desert scrub to ponderosa pine forests. It can live in sandy to clayey textured soils. It can stabilize shifting sand.

== Cultivation ==
Indian ricegrass is an important food for wild grazers such as bison, bighorn sheep, elk, mule deer, pronghorns, and jackrabbits. For some of these species, it is especially vital in late winter, as it produces green shoots earlier than other grasses. The seeds are heavily consumed by many rodents and birds. Seed caching rodents may enhance seedling survival and long-term survival of the plant.

Indian ricegrass is preferentially consumed by cattle and is an early casualty of overgrazing.

== Uses ==
In the past, the grass was a staple food of Native Americans, especially when the maize crop failed, and for non-agricultural tribes. Seed of the ricegrass was gathered and ground into meal or flour and made into bread. Since 2000, the ricegrass has been cultivated in Montana and marketed under the trade name Montina as a gluten-free grain. The Zuni people used the ground seeds as a staple before the availability of corn.

== In culture ==
It was officially recognized as the Nevada state grass in 1977, and as the Utah state grass in 1990.
