= List of grasses of New Zealand =

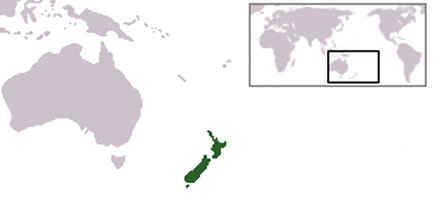
Location of New Zealand

The grass family Poaceae is one of the largest plant families in New Zealand. There are 496 grass species recorded, the majority of which are introduced and naturalised – a total of 285, including one eradicated species and 54 casually–naturalised species. Of the 194 indigenous species, the majority (165 species) are endemic.

== Species list ==
The following is a list of grass species known to exist in New Zealand, sorted alphabetically by genus. The conservation statuses follow the Department of Conservation's Conservation Status of Vascular Plants in New Zealand (2023). All species are sourced from the Landcare Research Flora of New Zealand website, unless indicated otherwise.

=== Achnatherum P.Beauv. ===
- Achnatherum petriei (Buchanan) S.W.L.Jacobs et J.Everett (Endemic; At Risk - Declining)

=== Agrostis L. ===
- Agrostis capillaris L. (Naturalised)
- Agrostis castellana Boiss. et. Reut. (Naturalised)
- Agrostis dyeri Petrie (Endemic; Not Threatened)
- Agrostis gigantea Roth (Naturalised)
- Agrostis imbecilla Zotov (Endemic; Data Deficient)
- Agrostis magellanica Lam. (Indigenous; At Risk - Naturally Uncommon)
- Agrostis muelleriana Vickery (Indigenous; Not Threatened)
- Agrostis muscosa Kirk (Endemic; Not Threatened)
- Agrostis nebulosa Boiss. & Reut. (Naturalised - Casual)
- Agrostis oresbia Edgar (Indigenous; Data Deficient)
- Agrostis pallescens Cheeseman (Endemic; At Risk - Naturally Uncommon)
- Agrostis personata Edgar (Endemic; Not Threatened)
- Agrostis petriei Hack. (Endemic; Not Threatened)
- Agrostis stolonifera L. (Naturalised)
- Agrostis subulata Hook.f. (Endemic; At Risk - Naturally Uncommon)

=== Aira L. ===
- Aira caryophyllea L. (Naturalised)
- Aira cupaniana Guss. (Naturalised - Casual)
- Aira elegans Kunth (Naturalised)
- Aira praecox L. (Naturalised)

=== Alopecurus L. ===
- Alopecurus aequalis Sobol. (Naturalised)
- Alopecurus geniculatus L. (Naturalised)
- Alopecurus myosuroides Huds. (Naturalised - Casual)
- Alopecurus pratensis L. (Naturalised)

=== Amelichloa Arriaga & Barkworth ===
- Amelichloa caudata (Trin.) Arriaga & Barkworth (Naturalised)

=== Ampelodesmos Link ===
- Ampelodesmos mauritanicus (Poir.) T. Durand & Schinz (Naturalised)

=== Amphibromus Nees ===
- Amphibromus fluitans Kirk (Endemic; At Risk - Declining)

=== Andropogon L. ===
- Andropogon virginicus L. (Naturalised)

=== Anemanthele Veldkamp ===
- Anemanthele lessoniana (Steud.) Veldkamp (Endemic; At Risk - Declining)

=== Anthosachne Steud. ===
- Anthosachne aprica (Á.Löve et Connor) C.Yen et J.L.Yang (Endemic; At Risk - Naturally Uncommon)
- Anthosachne falcis (Connor) Barkworth et S.W.L.Jacobs (Endemic; At Risk - Declining)
- Anthosachne kingiana (Banks et Sol. ex Hook.f.) Govaerts (Indigenous; At Risk - Declining)
- Anthosachne sacandros (Connor) Barkworth et S.W.L.Jacobs (Endemic; At Risk - Naturally Uncommon)
- Anthosachne scabra (R.Br.) Nevski (Naturalised)
- Anthosachne solandri (Steud.) Barkworth et S.W.L.Jacobs (Endemic; Not Threatened)

=== Anthoxanthum L. ===
- Anthoxanthum aristatum Boiss. (Naturalised)
- Anthoxanthum brunonis (Hook. f.) de Lange & C.J. James (Endemic; At Risk - Naturally Uncommon)
- Anthoxanthum cupreum (Zotov) de Lange & C.J. James (Endemic; At Risk - Declining)
- Anthoxanthum equisetum (Zotov) de Lange & C.J. James (Endemic; Not Threatened)
- Anthoxanthum fuscum (Zotov) de Lange & C.J. James (Endemic; Not Threatened)
- Anthoxanthum novae-zelandiae (Gand.) de Lange & C.J. James (Endemic; Not Threatened)
- Anthoxanthum odoratum L. (Naturalised)
- Anthoxanthum recurvatum (Hack.) de Lange & C.J. James (Endemic; Not Threatened)
- Anthoxanthum redolens P.Royen (Endemic; Not Threatened)

=== Aristida L. ===
- Aristida longespica Poir. (Naturalised)
- Aristida ramosa R.Br. (Naturalised)
- Aristida vagans Cav. (Naturalised - Casual)

=== Arrhenatherum P.Beauv. ===
- Arrhenatherum elatius (L.) P.Beauv. ex J.Presl & C.Presl (Naturalised)

=== Arundo L. ===
- Arundo donax L. (Naturalised)

=== Australopyrum (Tzvelev) Á.Löve ===
- Australopyrum calcis Connor et Molloy (Endemic; Threatened - Nationally Critical)
- Australopyrum pectinatum (Labill.) (Naturalised)
- Australopyrum retrofractum (Vickery) (Naturalised)

=== Austroderia N.P.Barker et H.P.Linder ===
- Austroderia fulvida (Buchanan) N.P.Barker et H.P.Linder (Endemic; Not Threatened)
- Austroderia richardii (Endl.) N.P.Barker et H.P.Linder (Endemic; Not Threatened)
- Austroderia splendens (Connor) N.P.Barker et H.P.Linder (Endemic; At Risk - Declining)
- Austroderia toetoe (Zotov) N.P.Barker et H.P.Linder (Endemic; Not Threatened)
- Austroderia turbaria (Connor) N.P.Barker et H.P.Linder (Endemic; Nationally Critical)

=== Austrostipa S.W.L.Jacobs & J.Everett ===
- Austrostipa bigeniculata (Hughes) S.W.L. Jacobs et J. Everett (Naturalised)
- Austrostipa blackii (C.E. Hubb.) S.W.L. Jacobs et J. Everett (Naturalised)
- Austrostipa curticoma (Vickery) S.W.L.Jacobs & J.Everett (Naturalised)
- Austrostipa flavescens (Labill.) S.W.L. Jacobs et J. Everett (Naturalised)
- Austrostipa nitida (Summerhayes et C.E.Hubb.) S.W.L. Jacobs et J. Everett (Naturalised)
- Austrostipa nodosa (S.T.Blake) S.W.L. Jacobs et J. Everett (Naturalised)
- Austrostipa ramosissima (Trin.) S.W.L. Jacobs & J. Everett (Naturalised)
- Austrostipa rudis (Spreng.) S.W.L. Jacobs et J. Everett (Naturalised)
- Austrostipa scabra (Lindl.) S.W.L. Jacobs et J. Everett (Naturalised)
- Austrostipa stipoides (Hook.f.) S.W.L. Jacobs et J. Everett (Indigenous; Not Threatened)
- Austrostipa stuposa (Hughes) S.W.L. Jacobs et J. Everett (Naturalised)
- Austrostipa verticillata (Nees) S.W.L. Jacobs et J. Everett (Naturalised)

=== Avena L. ===
- Avena barbata Link (Naturalised)
- Avena byzantina K.Koch (Naturalised - Casual)
- Avena fatua L. (Naturalised)
- Avena sativa L. (Naturalised)
- Avena sterilis (Durieu) M.Gillet & Magne (Naturalised)
- Avena strigosa Schreb. (Naturalised)

=== Avenella L. ===
- Avenella flexuosa (L.) Trin. (Naturalised)

=== Axonopus P.Beauv. ===
- Axonopus compressus (Sw.) P.Beauv. (Naturalised - Casual)
- Axonopus fissifolius (Raddi) Kuhlm. (Naturalised)

=== Bambusa Schreb. ===
- Bambusa multiplex (Willd.) Munro (Naturalised)
- Bambusa oldhamii Munro (Naturalised)

=== Bouteloua Lag. ===
- Bouteloua gracilis (Kunth) Lag. ex Griffiths (Naturalised)

=== Bothriochloa Kuntze ===
- Bothriochloa bladhii (Retz.) S.T.Blake (Naturalised)
- Bothriochloa macra (Steud.) S.T.Blake (Naturalised)

=== Brachypodium P.Beauv. ===
- Brachypodium distachyon (L.) P.Beauv. (Naturalised - Casual)
- Brachypodium pinnatum (L.) P.Beauv. (Naturalised)
- Brachypodium sylvaticum (Huds.) (Naturalised)

=== Briza L. ===
- Briza maxima L. (Naturalised)
- Briza media L. (Naturalised)
- Briza minor L. (Naturalised)

=== Bromus L. ===
- Bromus arenarius Labill. (Indigenous; At Risk - Naturally Uncommon)
- Bromus brevis Nees (Naturalised)
- Bromus catharticus Vahl (Naturalised)
- Bromus commutatus Schrad. (Naturalised)
- Bromus diandrus Roth (Naturalised)
- Bromus erectus Huds. (Naturalised - Casual)
- Bromus hordeaceus L. (Naturalised)
- Bromus inermis Leyss. (Naturalised)
- Bromus japonicus Thunb. (Naturalised - Casual)
- Bromus lithobius Trin. (Naturalised)
- Bromus madritensis L. (Naturalised)
- Bromus racemosus L. (Naturalised)
- Bromus rubens L. (Naturalised - Casual)
- Bromus secalinus L. (Naturalised - Casual)
- Bromus sitchensis Trin. (Naturalised)
- Bromus cebadilla Desv. (Naturalised)
- Bromus sterilis L. (Naturalised)
- Bromus tectorum L. (Naturalised)

=== Buchloe (Nutt.) Engelm. ===
- Buchloe dactyloides (Nutt.) Engelm. (Naturalised - Casual)

=== Calamagrostis L. ===
- Calamagrostis arenaria (L.) Roth (Naturalised)
- Calamagrostis epigejos (L.) Roth (Naturalised - Casual)

=== Catapodium Link ===
- Catapodium rigidum (L.) C.E.Hubb. (Naturalised)

=== Cenchrus L. ===
- Cenchrus americanus (L.) Morrone (Naturalised - Casual)
- Cenchrus caliculatus Cav.
- Cenchrus clandestinus (Hochst. ex Chiov.) Morrone (Naturalised)
- Cenchrus latifolius (Spreng.) Morrone (Naturalised)
- Cenchrus longisetus M.C. Johnst. (Naturalised)
- Cenchrus macrourus (Trin.) Morrone (Naturalised)
- Cenchrus purpurascens Thunb. (Naturalised)
- Cenchrus purpureus (Schumach.) Morrone (Naturalised)
- Cenchrus setaceus (Forssk.) Morrone (Naturalised)

=== Chascolyptrum Lam. ===
- Chascolyptrum subaristatum (Lam.) Desv. (Naturalised)
- Chascolytrum poomorphum (J.Presl) Essi, Longhi-Wagner et Souza-Chies (Naturalised - Casual)
- Chascolytrum rufum J.Presl (Naturalised)
- Chascolytrum subaristatum (Lam.) Desv. (Naturalised - Casual)
- Chascolytrum uniolae (Nees) Essi, Longhi-Wagner et Souza-Chies (Naturalised - Casual)

=== Chasmanthium Link ===
- Chasmanthium latifolium (Michx.) H.O.Yates (Naturalised)

=== Chimonobambusa Makino ===
- Chimonobambusa marmorea (Mitford) Makino (Naturalised)
- Chimonobambusa quadrangularis (Franceschi) (Naturalised)

=== Chionochloa Zotov ===
- Chionochloa acicularis Zotov (Endemic; Not Threatened)
- Chionochloa antarctica (Hook.f.) Zotov (Endemic; At Risk - Naturally Uncommon)
- Chionochloa australis (Buchanan) Zotov (Endemic; Not Threatened)
- Chionochloa beddiei Zotov (Endemic; Threatened - Nationally Vulnerable)
- Chionochloa bromoides (Hook.f.) Zotov (Endemic; At Risk - Naturally Uncommon)
- Chionochloa cheesemanii (Hack.) Zotov (Endemic; Not Threatened)
- Chionochloa conspicua (G.Forst.) Zotov (Endemic; Not Threatened)
- Chionochloa crassiuscula (Kirk) Zotov (Endemic; At Risk - Naturally Uncommon)
- Chionochloa defracta Connor (Endemic; At Risk - Naturally Uncommon)
- Chionochloa flavescens Connor (Endemic; Not Threatened)
- Chionochloa flavicans Connor (Endemic; At Risk - Declining)
- Chionochloa juncea Zotov (Endemic; At Risk - Declining)
- Chionochloa lanea Connor (Endemic; At Risk - Naturally Uncommon)
- Chionochloa macra Zotov (Endemic; Not Threatened)
- Chionochloa nivifera Connor et K.M.Lloyd (Endemic; At Risk - Naturally Uncommon)
- Chionochloa oreophila (Petrie) Zotov (Endemic; Not Threatened)
- Chionochloa ovata (Buchanan) Zotov (Endemic; At Risk - Declining)
- Chionochloa pallens Connor (Endemic; Not Threatened)
- Chionochloa rigida Connor (Endemic; Not Threatened)
- Chionochloa rubra Connor (Endemic; Not Threatened)
- Chionochloa spiralis Zotov (Endemic; At Risk - Naturally Uncommon)
- Chionochloa teretifolia (Petrie) Zotov (Endemic; Not Threatened)
- Chionochloa vireta Connor (Endemic; At Risk - Naturally Uncommon)

=== Chloris Sw. ===
- Chloris gayana Kunth (Naturalised)
- Chloris truncata R.Br. (Naturalised)

=== Chusquea Kunth ===
- Chusquea galeottiana Rupr. ex Munro (Naturalised)
- Chusquea gigantea J. P. Demoly (Naturalised)

=== Connorochloa Barkworth, S.W.L.Jacobs & H.Q.Zhang ===
- Connorochloa tenuis (Buchanan) Barkworth, S.W.L.Jacobs, et H.Q.Zhang (Endemic; At Risk - Declining)

=== Coix L. ===
- Coix lacryma-jobi L. (Naturalised - Casual)

=== Cortaderia Nees ===
- Cortaderia jubata (Lemoine) Stapf (Naturalised)
- Cortaderia selloana (Schult. et Schult.f.) Asch. et Graebn. (Naturalised)

=== Cymbopogon Spreng. ===
- Cymbopogon refractus (R.Br.) A.Camus (Naturalised)

=== Cynodon Rich. ===
- Cynodon dactylon (L.) Pers. (Naturalised)
- Cynodon transvaalensis Burtt Davy (Naturalised)

=== Cynosurus L. ===
- Cynosurus echinatus L. (Naturalised)
- Cynosurus cristatus L. (Naturalised)

=== Dactylis L. ===
- Dactylis glomerata L. (Naturalised)

=== Dactyloctenium Willd. ===
- Dactyloctenium aegyptium (L.) Willd. (Naturalised - Casual)

=== Danthonia DC. ===
- Danthonia decumbens (L.) DC. (Naturalised)

=== Deschampsia P.Beauv. ===
- Deschampsia cespitosa (L.) P.Beauv. (Indigenous; At Risk - Declining)
- Deschampsia chapmanii Petrie (Endemic; Not Threatened)
- Deschampsia gracillima Kirk (Endemic; At Risk - Naturally Uncommon)
- Deschampsia pusilla Petrie (Endemic; At Risk - Naturally Uncommon)
- Deschampsia tenella Petrie (Endemic; Not Threatened)

=== Dichanthelium (Hitchc. & Chase) Gould ===
- Dichanthelium lanuginosum (Ell.) Gould (Naturalised)
- Dichanthelium lindheimeri (Nash) Gould (Naturalised - Casual)
- Dichanthelium sphaerocarpon (Elliott) Gould (Naturalised)

=== Digitaria Haller ===
- Digitaria abyssinica (Hochst. ex A.Rich.) Stapf (Naturalised - Casual)
- Digitaria aequiglumis (Hack. et Arechav.) Parodi (Naturalised)
- Digitaria ciliaris (Retz.) Koeler (Naturalised)
- Digitaria ischaemum (Schreb.) Muhl. (Naturalised)
- Digitaria sanguinalis (L.) Scop. (Naturalised)
- Digitaria setigera Roem. et Schult. (Indigenous; At Risk - Naturally Uncommon)
- Digitaria violascens Link (Naturalised)

=== Diplachne Lam. ===
- Diplachne fusca (L.) P.Beauv. ex Roem. & Schult. (Naturalised - Casual)

=== Distichlis Raf. ===
- Distichlis spicata (L.) Greene (Naturalised - Casual)

=== Echinochloa P.Beauv. ===
- Echinochloa crus-galli (L.) P.Beauv. (Naturalised)
- Echinochloa crus-pavonis (Kunth) Schult. (Naturalised)
- Echinochloa esculenta (A.Braun) H.Scholz (Naturalised)
- Echinochloa microstachya (Wiegand) Rydb. (Naturalised - Casual)
- Echinochloa oryzoides (Ard.) Fritsch (Naturalised - Casual)
- Echinochloa telmatophila P.W. Michael et Vickery (Naturalised)

=== Echinopogon P.Beauv. ===
- Echinopogon ovatus (G.Forst.) P.Beauv. (Indigenous; At Risk - Declining)

=== Ehrharta Thunb. ===
- Ehrharta calycina Sm. (Naturalised)
- Ehrharta erecta Lam. (Naturalised)
- Ehrharta longiflora Sm. (Naturalised)
- Ehrharta villosa (L.f.) Schult. et Schult.f. (Naturalised)

=== Eleusine Gaertn. ===
- Eleusine indica (L.) Gaertn. (Naturalised)
- Eleusine tristachya (Lam.) Lam. (Naturalised)

=== Elytrigia Desv. ===
- Elytrigia repens (l.) Nevski (Naturalised)

=== Entolasia Stapf ===
- Entolasia marginata (R.Br.) Hughes (Naturalised)

=== Eragrostis Wolf ===
- Eragrostis amabilis (L.) Wright & Arn. ex Nees (Naturalised)
- Eragrostis brownii (Kunth) Wight (Naturalised)
- Eragrostis cilianensis (All.) Janch. (Naturalised)
- Eragrostis curvula (Schrad.) Nees (Naturalised)
- Eragrostis diffusa Buckley (Naturalised - Casual)
- Eragrostis leptostachya (R.Br.) Steud. (Indigenous - Coloniser)
- Eragrostis mexicana (Hornem.) Link (Naturalised - Casual)
- Eragrostis minor Host (Naturalised - Casual)
- Eragrostis multicaulis Steud. (Naturalised)
- Eragrostis pilosa (L.) P.Beauv. (Naturalised - Casual)
- Eragrostis plana Nees (Naturalised)
- Eragrostis tenuifolia (A.Rich.) Hochst. ex Steud. (Naturalised - Casual)

=== Festuca L. ===
- Festuca actae Connor (Endemic; At Risk - Naturally Uncommon)
- Festuca bromoides L. (Naturalised)
- Festuca contracta Kirk (Naturalised)
- Festuca coxii (Petrie) Hack. (Endemic; At Risk - Naturally Uncommon)
- Festuca deflexa Connor (Endemic; Not Threatened)
- Festuca fasciculata Forssk. (Naturalised)
- Festuca filiformis Pourr. (Naturalised)
- Festuca luciarum Connor (Endemic; Data Deficient)
- Festuca madida Connor (Endemic; At Risk - Naturally Uncommon)
- Festuca matthewsii Connor (Endemic; Not Threatened)
- Festuca megalura L. (Naturalised)
- Festuca multinodis Petrie et Hack. (Endemic; Not Threatened)
- Festuca myuros L. (Naturalised)
- Festuca novae-zelandiae (Hack.) Cockayne (Endemic; Not Threatened)
- Festuca ovina L. (Naturalised)
- Festuca rubra Gaudin (Naturalised)
- Festuca trachyphylla (Hack.) Krajina (Naturalised)
- Festuca ultramafica Connor (Endemic; At Risk - Naturally Uncommon)

=== Gastridium P.Beauv. ===
- Gastridium ventricosum (Gouan) Schinz et Thell. (Naturalised)

=== Glyceria R.Br. ===
- Glyceria declinata Bréb. (Naturalised)
- Glyceria fluitans (L.) R.Br. (Naturalised)
- Glyceria maxima (Hartm.) Holumb. (Naturalised)
- Glyceria notata Chevall. (Naturalised)
- Glyceria striata (Lam.) Hitchc. (Naturalised)

=== Hainardia Greuter ===
- Hainardia cylindrica (Willd.) Greuter (Naturalised)

=== Helictotrichon Besser ===
- Helictotrichon pubescens (Huds.) Pilg. (Naturalised - Casual)

=== Hemarthria R.Br. ===
- Hemarthria uncinata R.Br. (Naturalised - Casual)

=== Himalayacalamus Keng f. ===
- Himalayacalamus falconeri (Munro) Keng f. (Naturalised)

=== Holcus L. ===
- Holcus lanatus L. (Naturalised)
- Holcus mollis L. (Naturalised)

=== Hordeum L. ===
- Hordeum jubatum L. (Naturalised)
- Hordeum marinum Huds. (Naturalised)
- Hordeum murinum L. (Naturalised)
- Hordeum secalinum Schreb. (Naturalised)
- Hordeum vulgare L. (Naturalised)

=== Imperata Cirillo ===
- Imperata cheesemanii Hack. (Endemic; At Risk - Naturally Uncommon)
- Imperata cylindrica (Nees) C.E.Hubb. (Naturalised)

=== Isachne R.Br. ===
- Isachne globosa (Thunb.) Kuntze (Indigenous; Not Threatened)

=== Koeleria Pers. ===
- Koeleria antarctica (G.Forst.) Barberá, Quintanar, Soreng et P.M.Peterson (Endemic; At Risk - Declining)
- Koeleria arduana (Edgar et A.P.Druce) Barberá, Quintanar, Soreng et P.M.Peterson (Indigenous; At Risk - Declining)
- Koeleria cheesemanii (Hack.) Petrie (Endemic; Not Threatened)
- Koeleria drucei (Edgar) Barberá, Quintanar, Soreng et P.M.Peterson (Endemic; At Risk - Naturally Uncommon)
- Koeleria lasiorhachis (Hack) Barberá, Quintanar, Soreng et P.M.Peterson (Endemic; Not Threatened)
- Koeleria lepida (Edgar et A.P.Druce) Barberá, Quintanar, Soreng et P.M.Peterson (Endemic; Not Threatened)
- Koeleria novozelandica Domin (Endemic; Not Threatened)
- Koeleria riguorum Edgar et Gibb (Endemic; Data Deficient)
- Koeleria serpentina (Edgar et A.P.Druce) Barberá, Quintanar, Soreng et P.M.Peterson (Endemic; At Risk - Naturally Uncommon)
- Koeleria spicata (L.) Barberá, Quintanar, Soreng et P.M.Peterson (Indigenous; Not Threatened)
- Koeleria tenella (Petrie) Barberá, Quintanar, Soreng et P.M.Peterson (Endemic; Not Threatened)
- Koeleria youngii (Hook.f.) Barberá, Quintanar, Soreng et P.M.Peterson (Endemic; Not Threatened)

=== Lachnagrostis Trin. ===
- Lachnagrostis ammobia Edgar (Endemic; At Risk - Declining)
- Lachnagrostis billardierei (R.Br.) Trin. (Indigenous; Not Threatened)
- Lachnagrostis elata Edgar (Endemic; At Risk - Naturally Uncommon)
- Lachnagrostis filiformis (G.Forst.) Trin. (Indigenous; Not Threatened)
- Lachnagrostis glabra (Petrie) Edgar (Endemic; Data Deficient)
- Lachnagrostis leptostachys (Hook.f.) Zotov (Endemic; At Risk - Naturally Uncommon)
- Lachnagrostis littoralis (Hack.) Edgar (Endemic; Not Threatened)
- Lachnagrostis lyallii (Hook.f.) Zotov (Endemic; Not Threatened)
- Lachnagrostis pilosa (Buchanan) Edgar (Endemic; Not Threatened)
- Lachnagrostis striata (Colenso) Zotov (Endemic; Not Threatened)
- Lachnagrostis tenuis (Cheeseman) Edgar (Endemic; Threatened - Nationally Vulnerable)
- Lachnagrostis uda Edgar (Endemic; Not Threatened - Naturally Uncommon)

=== Lagurus L. ===
- Lagurus ovatus L. (Naturalised)

=== Leersia Sw. ===
- Leersia oryzoides (L.0) Sw. (Naturalised)

=== Lepturus R.Br. ===
- Lepturus repens (G.Forst.) R.Br. (Indigenous - Vagrant)

=== Leymus Hochst. ===
- Leymus arenarius (L.) Hochst. (Naturalised)
- Leymus racemosus (Lam.) Tzvelev (Naturalised)

=== Lolium L. ===
- Lolium arundinaceum (Schreb.) Darbysh. (Naturalised)
- Lolium multiflorum Lam. (Naturalised)
- Lolium perenne L. (Naturalised)
- Lolium pratense (Huds.) Darbysh (Naturalised)
- Lolium remotum Schrank (Naturalised)
- Lolium rigidum Gaudin. (Naturalised)
- Lolium temulentum L. (Naturalised)

=== Megathyrsus (Pilg.) B.K.Simon & S.W.L.Jacobs ===
- Megathyrsus maximus (Jacq.) B.K.Simon & S.W.L.Jacobs (Naturalised)

=== Melica L. ===
- Melica minuta L. (Naturalised - Casual)

=== Melinis P.Beauv ===
- Melinis repens (Willd.) Zizka (Naturalised - Casual)

=== Microlaena R.Br ===
- Microlaena avenacea (Raoul.) Hook.f. (Indigenous; Not Threatened)
- Microlaena carsei Cheeseman (Endemic; Threatened - Nationally Vulnerable)
- Microlaena polynoda (Hook.f.) Hook.f. (Endemic; At Risk - Declining)
- Microlaena stipoides (Labill.) R.Br. (Indigenous; Not Threatened)

=== Milium L. ===
- Milium effusum L. (Naturalised - Casual)

=== Miscanthus Andersson ===
- Miscanthus nepalensis (Trin.) Hack. (Naturalised)
- Miscanthus sinensis Andersson (Naturalised)

=== Nardus L. ===
- Nardus stricta Sp. (Naturalised)

=== Nassella (Trin.) É.Desv. ===
- Nassella neesiana (Trin. et Rupr.) Barkworth (Naturalised)
- Nassella tenuissima (Trin.) Barkworth (Naturalised - Casual)
- Nassella trichotoma (Nees) Arechav. (Naturalised)

=== Oloptum Röser & Hamasha ===
- Oloptum miliaceum (L.) Röser & Hamasha (Naturalised)

=== Oplismenus P.Beauv. ===
- Oplismenus hirtellus (L.) P.Beauv. (Indigenous; Not Threatened)

=== Panicum L. ===
- Panicum capillare L. (Naturalised)
- Panicum dichotomiflorum Michx. (Naturalised)
- Panicum miliaceum L. (Naturalised)
- Panicum schinzii Hack. (Naturalised)
- Panicum virgatum L. (Naturalised)

=== Parapholis C.E.Hubb. ===
- Parapholis incurva (L.) C.E.Hubb. (Naturalised)
- Parapholis strigosa (Dumort.) C.E.Hubb. (Naturalised)

=== Paspalum L. ===
- Paspalum conjugatum P.J.Bergius (Naturalised)
- Paspalum dilatatum Poir. (Naturalised)
- Paspalum distichum L. (Naturalised)
- Paspalum orbiculare G.Forst. (Indigenous; Threatened - Nationally Vulnerable)
- Paspalum paniculatum L. (Naturalised - Casual)
- Paspalum pubiflorum E.Fourn. (Naturalised - Casual)
- Paspalum urvillei Steud. (Naturalised)
- Paspalum vaginatum Sw. (Naturalised)

=== Pentapogon R.Br. ===
- Pentapogon aucklandicus (Hook.f.) de Lange et L.M.H.Schmid (Endemic; Not Threatened)
- Pentapogon avenoides (Hook.f.) P.M. Peterson, Romasch. et Soreng (Endemic; Not Threatened)
- Pentapogon crinitus (L. f.) P.M. Peterson, Romasch. et Soreng (Indigenous; Not Threatened)
- Pentapogon inaequiglumis (Hack. ex Cheeseman) P.M. Peterson, Romasch. et Soreng (Indigenous; At Risk - Declining)
- Pentapogon lacustris (Edgar et Connor) de Lange et L.M.H.Schmid (Endemic; Threatened - Nationally Critical)
- Pentapogon lautumia (Edgar & Connor) P.M. Peterson, Romasch. & Soreng (Endemic; Threatened - Nationally Endangered)
- Pentapogon micranthus (Cav.) P.M. Peterson, Romasch. et Soreng (Indigenous; Threatened - Nationally Critical)
- Pentapogon rarus (R. Br.) P.M. Peterson, Romasch. et Soreng (Indigenous; At Risk - Declining)
- Pentapogon quadrifidus (Labill.) Baill. (Naturalised)
- Pentapogon quadrisetus (Labill.) P.M. Peterson, Romasch. et Soreng (Naturalised)
- Pentapogon sieberianus (Trin. et Rupr.) P.M. Peterson, Romasch. et Soreng (Naturalised)
- Pentapogon youngii (Hook.f.) de Lange L.M.H.Schmid, comb. nov. (Endemic; At Risk - Naturally Uncommon)

=== Phalaris L. ===
- Phalaris angusta Trin. (Naturalised - Casual)
- Phalaris aquatica L. (Naturalised)
- Phalaris arundinacea L. (Naturalised)
- Phalaris canariensis L. (Naturalised)
- Phalaris minor Retz. (Naturalised)
- Phalaris paradoxa L. (Naturalised)

=== Phleum L. ===
- Phleum pratense L. (Naturalised)

=== Phragmites Adans. ===
- Phragmites australis (Cav.) Trin. ex Steud. (Naturalised)
- Phragmites karka (Retz.) Trin. ex Steud. (Naturalised)

=== Phyllostachys Siebold & Zucc. ===
- Phyllostachys aurea Rivière (Naturalised)
- Phyllostachys bambusoides Siebold et Zucc. (Naturalised)
- Phyllostachys edulis (Carrière) J.Houz. (Naturalised)
- Phyllostachys heterocycla (Carrière) S.Matsum. (Naturalised)
- Phyllostachys nigra (Mitford) Rendle (Naturalised)

=== Piptochaetium J.Presl ===
- Piptochaetium depressum (Steud.) Pena Hernández, Negritto, Ruiz, E. & C.M. Baeza (Naturalised)

=== Pleioblastus Nakai ===
- Pleioblastus auricomus (Mitford) D.C.McClint. (Naturalised)
- Pleioblastus chino (Franch. et Sav.) Makino (Naturalised)
- Pleioblastus gramineus (Bean) Nakai (Naturalised)
- Pleioblastus hindsii (Munro) Nakai (Naturalised)
- Pleioblastus variegatus (Miq.) Makino (Naturalised)

=== Poa L. ===
- Poa acicularifolia Buchanan (Endemic; At Risk - Naturally Uncommon)
- Poa alpina L. (Naturalised - Casual)
- Poa anceps G.Forst. (Endemic; Not Threatened)
- Poa annua L. (Naturalised)
- Poa antipoda Petrie (Endemic; At Risk Naturally Uncommon)
- Poa astonii Petrie (Endemic; Not Threatened)
- Poa aucklandica Petrie (Endemic; At Risk - Naturally Uncommon)
- Poa billardierei (Spreng.)St.-Yves (Endemic; At Risk Declining)
- Poa breviglumis Hook.f. (Endemic; Not Threatened)
- Poa buchananii Zotov (Endemic; Not Threatened)
- Poa bulbosa L. (Naturalised)
- Poa celsa Edgar (Endemic; Not Threatened)
- Poa chathamica Petrie (Endemic; At Risk - Naturally Uncommon)
- Poa cita Edgar (Endemic; Not Threatened)
- Poa cockayneana Petrie (Endemic; Not Threatened)
- Poa colensoi Hook.f. (Endemic; Not Threatened)
- Poa compressa L. (Naturalised)
- Poa dipsacea Petrie (Endemic; Not Threatened)
- Poa foliosa (Hook.f.) Hook.f. (Endemic; At Risk - Naturally Uncommon)
- Poa hesperia Edgar (Endemic; Not Threatened)
- Poa imbecilla Spreng (Endemic; Not Threatened)
- Poa incrassata Petrie (Endemic; At Risk - Naturally Uncommon)
- Poa infirma Kunth (Naturalised)
- Poa intrusa Edgar (Endemic; Data Deficient)
- Poa kirkii Buchanan (Endemic; Not Threatened)
- Poa labillardierei Steud. (Naturalised)
- Poa lindsayi Hook.f. (Endemic; Not Threatened)
- Poa litorosa Cheeseman (Endemic; At Risk - Naturally Uncommon)
- Poa maia Edgar (Endemic; Not Threatened)
- Poa maniototo Petrie (Endemic; At Risk - Declining)
- Poa matthewsii Petrie (Endemic; Not Threatened)
- Poa nemoralis L. (Naturalised)
- Poa novae-zelandiae Hack. (Endemic; Not Threatened)
- Poa palustris L. (Naturalised)
- Poa polyphylla Hack. (Endemic; At Risk - Naturally Uncommon)
- Poa pratensis L. (Naturalised)
- Poa pusilla Bergg. (Endemic; Not Threatened)
- Poa pygmaea Buchanan (Endemic; At Risk - Naturally Uncommon)
- Poa ramosissima Hook.f. (Endemic; At Risk - Declining)
- Poa remota Forselles (Naturalised - Casual)
- Poa schistacea Edgar (Endemic; Not Threatened)
- Poa senex Edgar (Endemic; At Risk - Naturally Uncommon)
- Poa sieberiana Spreng. (Naturalised)
- Poa spania Edgar et Molloy (Endemic; Threatened - Nationally Critical)
- Poa sublimis Edgar (Endemic; Not Threatened)
- Poa subvestita (Hack.) Edgar (Endemic; Not Threatened)
- Poa sudicola Edgar (Endemic; At Risk - Naturally Uncommon)
- Poa tennantiana Petrie (Endemic; At Risk - Naturally Uncommon)
- Poa tonsa Edgar (Endemic; Not Threatened)
- Poa trivialis L. (Naturalised)
- Poa xenica Edgar et Connor (Endemic; At Risk - Naturally Uncommon)

=== Polypogon Desf. ===
- Polypogon fugax Nees ex Streud. (Naturalised)
- Polypogon monspeliensis (L.) Desf. (Naturalised)
- Polypogon viridis (Gouan) Breistr. (Naturalised)

=== Pseudosasa Nakai ===
- Pseudosasa japonica (Steud.) Makino (Naturalised)

=== Puccinellia Parl. ===
- Puccinellia antipoda (Petrie) Allan et Jansen (Endemic; At Risk - Naturally Uncommon)
- Puccinellia chathamica (Cheeseman) Allan et Jansen (Endemic; At Risk - Declining)
- Puccinellia distans (L.) Parl. (Naturalised)
- Puccinellia fasciculata (Torr.) E.P.Bicknell (Naturalised)
- Puccinellia raroflorens Edgar (Endemic; Threatened - Nationally Critical)
- Puccinellia rupestris (With.) Fernald et Weath. (Naturalised)
- Puccinellia stricta (Hook.f.) Blom. (Endemic; Not Threatened)
- Puccinellia walkeri (Kirk) Allan (Endemic; At Risk - Naturally Uncommon)

=== Rostraria Trin. ===
- Rostraria cristata (L.) Tzvelev (Naturalised - Casual)

=== Rytidosperma Steud. ===
- Rytidosperma auriculatum (J.M.Black) Connor et Edgar (Naturalised)
- Rytidosperma australe (Petrie) Connor et Edgar (Indigenous; Not Threatened)
- Rytidosperma biannulare (Zotov) Connor et Edgar (Endemic; Not Threatened)
- Rytidosperma buchananii (Hook.f.) Connor et Edgar (Endemic; At Risk - Declining)
- Rytidosperma caespitosum (Gaudich.) Connor et Edgar (Naturalised)
- Rytidosperma carphoides (F.Muell. ex Benth.) Connor & Edgar (Naturalised)
- Rytidosperma clavatum (Zotov) Connor et Edgar (Endemic; Not Threatened)
- Rytidosperma corinum Connor et Edgar (Endemic; Data Deficient)
- Rytidosperma erianthum (Lindl.) Connor et Edgar (Naturalised)
- Rytidosperma exiguum (Kirk) H.P.Linder (Endemic; At Risk - Declining)
- Rytidosperma gracile (Hook.f.) Connor et Edgar (Indigenous; Not Threatened)
- Rytidosperma horrens Connor et Molloy (Endemic; Threataned - Nationally Critical)
- Rytidosperma laeve (Vickery) Connor et Edgar (Naturalised)
- Rytidosperma maculatum (Zotov) Connor et Edgar (Endemic; At Risk - Declining)
- Rytidosperma merum Connor et Edgar (Endemic; At Risk - Declining)
- Rytidosperma nigricans (Petrie) Connor et Edgar (Endemic; Not Threatened)
- Rytidosperma nudum (Hook.f.) Connor et Edgar (Endemic; At Risk - Naturally Uncommon)
- Rytidosperma penicillatum (Labill.) Connor et Edgar (Naturalised)
- Rytidosperma petrosum Connor et Edgar (Endemic; At Risk - Naturally Uncommon)
- Rytidosperma pilosum (R.Br.) Connor et Edgar (Naturalised)
- Rytidosperma pulchrum (Zotov) Connor et Edgar (Endemic; At Risk - Naturally Uncommon)
- Rytidosperma pumilum (Kirk) Connor et Edgar (Indigenous; Not Threatened)
- Rytidosperma racemosum (R.Br.) Connor et Edgar (Naturalised)
- Rytidosperma setifolium (Hook.f.) Connor et Edgar (Endemic; Not Threatened)
- Rytidosperma telmaticum Connor et Molloy (Endemic; Threataned - Nationally Vulnerable)
- Rytidosperma tenue (Petrie) Connor et Edgar (Endemic; Not Threatened)
- Rytidosperma tenuius (Steud.) A.Hansen et Sunding (Naturalised)
- Rytidosperma thomsonii (Buchanan) Connor et Edgar (Endemic; At Risk - Declining)
- Rytidosperma unarede (Raoul) Connor et Edgar (Endemic; Not Threatened)
- Rytidosperma viride (Zotov) Connor et Edgar (Endemic; Not Threatened)

=== Saccharum L. ===
- Saccharum officinarum L. (Naturalised - Casual)

=== Sacciolepis Nash ===
- Sacciolepis indica (L.) Chase (Naturalised)

=== Sasa Makino & Shibata ===
- Sasa palmata (Burb.) E.G.Camus (Naturalised)

=== Sasaella Makino ===
- Sasaella ramosa (Makino) Makino (Naturalised)

=== Secale L. ===
- Secale cereale L. (Naturalised)

=== Semiarundinaria Nakai ===
- Semiarundinaria fastuosa (Mitford) Makino (Naturalised)

=== Sesleria Scop. ===
- Sesleria albicans Schult. (Naturalised - Casual)
- Sesleria autumnalis (Scop.) F.W.Schultz (Naturalised - Casual)

=== Setaria P.Beauv. ===
  - Setaria gracilis Kunth (Naturalised)
- Setaria italica (L.) P.Beauv. (Naturalised)
- Setaria palmifolia (J. König) Stapf (Naturalised)
- Setaria parviflora (Poir.) Kerguélen (Naturalised)
- Setaria pumila (Poir.) Roem. et Schult. (Naturalised)
- Setaria sphacelata (Schumach.) Stapf & C.E.Hubb. (Naturalised - Casual)
- Setaria verticillata (L.) P.Beauv. (Naturalised)
- Setaria viridis (L.) P.Beauv. (Naturalised)

=== Simplicia Kirk ===
- Simplicia buchananii (Zotov) Zotov (Endemic; Threatened - Nationally Critical)
- Simplicia felix de Lange, J.R.Rolfe, Smissen et Ogle (Endemic; Threatened - Nationally Critical)
- Simplicia laxa Kirk (Endemic; Threatened - Nationally Critical)

=== Sorghum Moench ===
- Sorghum bicolor (L.) Moench (Naturalised)
- Sorghum halepense (L.) Pers. (Naturalised)

=== Spinifex L. ===
- Spinifex sericeus R.Br. (Indigenous; Not Threatened)

=== Sporobolus R.Br. ===
- Sporobolus africanus (Poir.) Robyns et Tournnay (Naturalised)
- Sporobolus anglicus (C.E.Hubb.) P.M.Peterson & Saarela (Naturalised)
- Sporobolus alterniflorus (Loisel.) P.M.Peterson & Saarela (Naturalised)
- Sporobolus cryptandrus (Torr.) A.Gray (Naturalised - Casual)
- Sporobolus diandrus (Retz.) P.Beauv. (Naturalised - Casual)
- Sporobolus elongatus R.Br. (Naturalised)

=== Stenostachys Turcz. ===
- Stenostachys deceptorix Connor (Endemic; At Risk - Naturally Uncommon)
- Stenostachys enysii (Kirk) Barkworth et S.W.L.Jacobs (Endemic; At Risk - Naturally Uncommon)
- Stenostachys gracilis (Hook.f.) Connor (Endemic; Not Threatened)
- Stenostachys laevis (Petrie) Connor (Endemic; At Risk - Naturally Uncommon)

=== Stenotaphrum Trin. ===
- Stenotaphrum secundatum (Walter) Kuntze (Naturalised)

=== Themeda Forssk. ===
- Themeda triandra Forssk. (Naturalised)

=== Thinopyrum Á.Löve ===
- Thinopyrum acutum (DC.) Banfi (Naturalised)
- Thinopyrum intermedium (Host) Barkworth & D.R.Dewey (Naturalised - Casual)
- Thinopyrum junceiforme (Á.Löve et D.Löve) Á.Löve (Naturalised)
- Thinopyrum obtusiflorum (Podp.) Barkworth & D.R.Dewey (Naturalised)

=== Trisetum Pers. ===
- Trisetum flavescens (L.) P.Beauv. (Naturalised - Casual)

=== Triticum L. ===
- Triticum aestivum L. (Naturalised)
- Triticum compactum Host (Naturalised - Casual)

=== Urochloa P.Beauv. ===
- Urochloa mutica (Forssk.) T.-Q.Nguyen (Naturalised)
- Urochloa panicoides P.Beauv. (Naturalised - Casual)
- Urochloa subquadripara (Trin.) R.D.Webster (Naturalised - Casual)

=== Zea L. ===
- Zea mays L. (Naturalised - Casual)

=== Zizania L. ===
- Zizania latifolia (Griseb.) Stapf (Naturalised)
- Zizania palustris L. (Naturalised - Eradicated)

=== Zotovia Edgar & Connor ===
- Zotovia acicularis Edgar et Connor (Endemic; At Risk - Naturally Uncommon)
- Zotovia colensoi (Hook.f.) Edgar et Connor (Endemic; Not Threatened)
- Zotovia thomsonii (Petrie) Edgar et Connor (Endemic; Not Threatened)

=== Zoysia Willd. ===
- Zoysia minima (Colenso) Zotov (Endemic; At Risk - Declining)
- Zoysia pauciflora Mez (Endemic; Not Threatened)
