= Grasses of New Zealand =

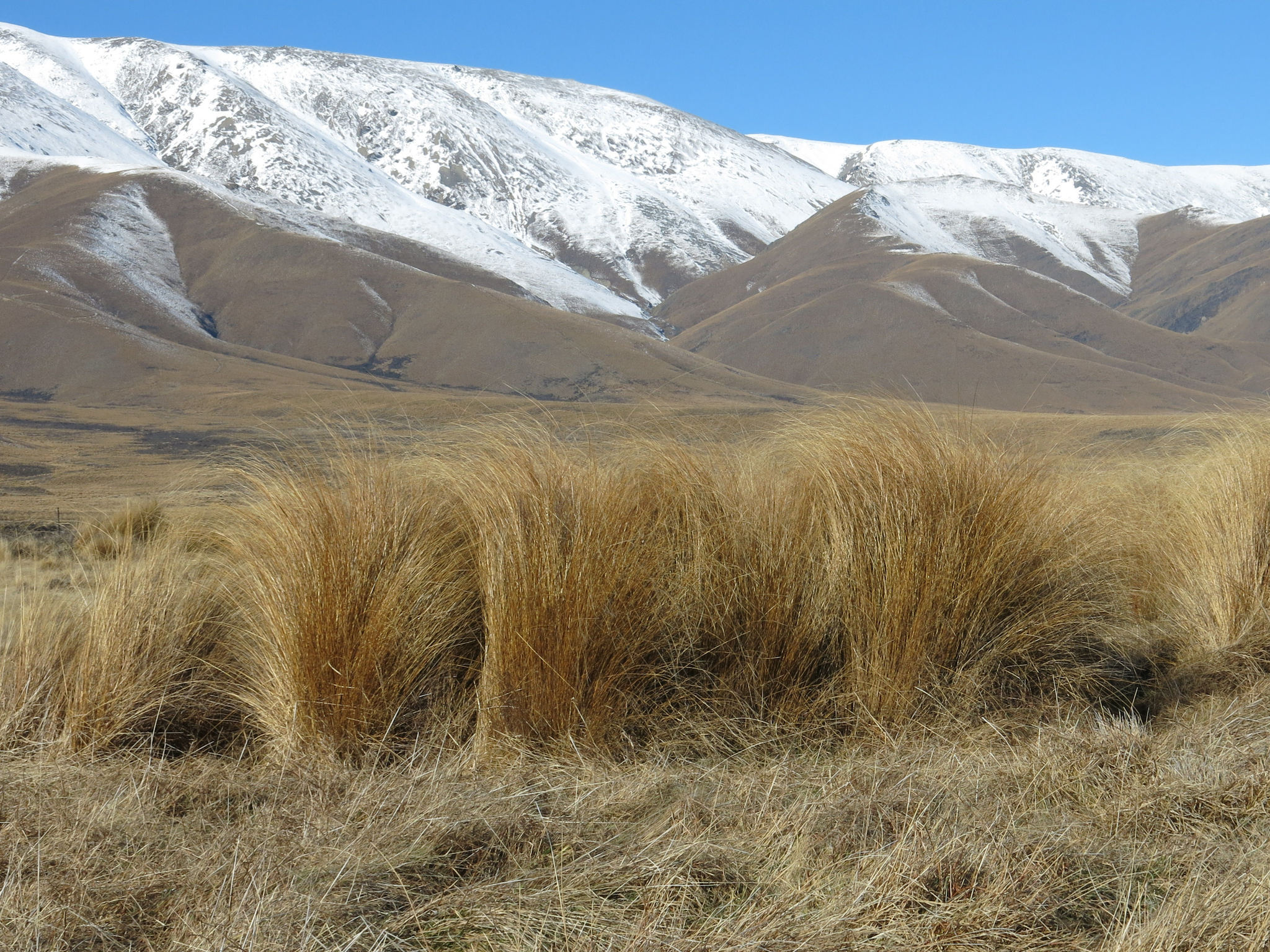
Chionochloa rubra - (red tussock) is a widely dispersed New Zealand endemic tussock grass

The grass family Poaceae is one of the largest plant families in New Zealand. There are 496 grass species recorded, the majority of which are introduced and naturalised - a total of 285 of the species including one eradicated species and 54 casually naturalised species. Of the 194 indigenous species, the majority, 165 species, are endemic.

== Grassland habitats ==
Grasses exist in all habitats in New Zealand, including alpine and montane areas, forests, wetlands, and coastal areas. However, several ecosystems are dominated largely by grasses. These are largely either alpine or montane tussock grasslands, or coastal.

== Threats ==
According to the report Conservation status of vascular plants in Aotearoa New Zealand, a slight majority of species are threat listed. This includes 16 Threatened species, 79 At Risk species, 7 Data Deficient species, and 2 non-resident native species.

Threat Statuses of Indigenous Species
Threat Status	Number of species	Percentage
Not Threatened	90	46.4
Vagrant	1	0.5
Coloniser	1	0.5
Data Deficient	7	3.6
At Risk - Declining	29	14.9
At Risk - Naturally Uncommon	50	25.8
Threatened - Nationally Endangered	1	0.5
Threatened - Nationally Vulnerable	5	2.6
Threatened - Nationally Critical	10	5.2
Total	194	

=== Threatening processes ===
Threatening processes include weeds, browsing, and habitat loss.

==== Weeds ====
In coastal areas, the spread of weeds such as Cortaderia jubata, Cortaderia selloana and Sporobolus africanus is threatening the native grasses Anthosachne kingiana subsp. multiflora, Austroderia splendens, and Echinopogon ovatus.

The invasive grass Ehrharta erecta poses a further threat to the already Threatened - Nationally Critical Simplicia felix, in the Wairarapa.

The Threatened - Nationally Critical Pentapogon micranthus is threatened by an influx of weedy species into its seral habitats.

The very localised limestone endemic Poa spania is threatened by invasive Hieracium spp., Sedum acre, and Dactylis glomerata.

The Threatened - Nationally Vulnerable Lachnagrostis tenuis, is impacted by competition with Agrostis stolonifera and Elytrigia spp., as well a grazing.

==== Habitat loss ====
Habitat loss to agriculture and urban development in the eastern South Island drylands are a threatening process for grasslands. One such example is Rytidosperma telmaticum, which is threatened by weeds resulting from hydrological change following intensified dairy farming in intermontane basins. Grassland loss to the Central Otago wine industry is threatening Anthosachne falcis (At Risk - Declining).

Amphibromus fluitans is threatened (At Risk - Declining) by wetland loss to drainage and weeds, as well as grazing.

The locally endemic Chionochloa juncea could be threatened by the expansion of open cast coal mining in its habitat in the Denniston and Stockton Plateaus.

Coastal habitat is particularly threatened in New Zealand, through development, use of vehicles, weeds, and erosion. Poa billardierei (Syn. Poa triodioides) and Lachnagrostis ammobia are two species impacted by these threats.

==== Browsing ====
New Zealand is not home to any native browsing mammals. As such, introduced species, particularly deer, feral pigs, feral goats, rabbits, and hares, as well as domestic livestock, are major threats to New Zealand plants.

The Chatham Island Austroderia turbaria was recently moved to Threatened – Nationally Critical, due to continued impacts of browse by livestock (sheep and cattle), feral pigs, and buff weka, which are naturalised on the Chatham Islands.

The limestone endemic Australopyrum calcis subsp. optatum is listed as Threatened - Nationally Critical, given its vulnerability to browsing.

In some cases, such as with the native grasses Simplicia felix and Anthosachne solandri, browsing can increase abundance, by reducing competition.

==== Local Endemism ====
Many New Zealand grass species are local endemics, leading them to be highly threatened by small changes to their environments. This includes taxa such as Pentapogon lacustris, Poa aucklandica subsp. rakiura, Poa spania, Puccinellia raroflorens, Simplicia buchananii, and Simplicia laxa, many of which do not have other obvious threats. Many of these species are endemic to specific rock or soil types.

== See also ==
- List of grasses of New Zealand
- Flora of New Zealand
