= Rytidosperma petrosum =

Conservation status
- Naturally Uncommon (NZ TCS)

Scientific classification
- Kingdom: Plantae
- Clade: Tracheophytes
- Clade: Angiosperms
- Clade: Monocots
- Clade: Commelinids
- Order: Poales
- Family: Poaceae
- Genus: Rytidosperma
- Species: R. petrosum

Binomial name
- Rytidosperma petrosum Connor & Edgar

Species of plant

Rytidosperma petrosum is a species of true grass in the subfamily Danthonioideae. It is endemic to New Zealand and was described in 1979 by New Zealand botanists Henry Connor and Elizabeth Edgar.

== Distribution ==
R. petrosum is endemic to New Zealand, and is found in the vicinity of the Cook Strait. In the Marlborough Sounds and surrounding islands it is found at D'Urville Island, the Chetwode Islands, and Stephens Island. In the North Island, it is found in the vicinity of Cape Palliser, as well as on Kāpiti Island.

The type specimen was collected by A.P. Druce in 1973 at Cape Palliser, on a cliff at 30 meters above sea level.

== Habitat ==
R. petrosum mainly grows in coastal sites on exposed, dry, sunny, lichen encrusted cliff faces surrounding the Cook Strait. It does not grow in deep soil, preferring cracks among lichen. It also grows on ultramafic boulders near the summit of D'Urville Island.

=== Rock types ===
It is found growing on limestone, greywacke, and ultramafic rock.

=== Habitat descriptions ===
At one site in Cape Palliser, it is described as associated with Pellaea calidirupium in dry windswept greywacke crevices.

At one site on D'Urville Island, it is associated with Leptospermum scoparium, Hebe urvilleana, Celmisia aff. gracilenta, andMetrosideros umbellata on ultramafic boulders.

On a greywacke outcrop on Kāpiti Island, R. petrosum is described as growing with Parmotrema perlatum agg., P. reticulatum agg., Xanthoparmelia spp., and Teloschistes flavicans.

== Description ==
R. petrosum is a stiff, dense grass that forms small tussocks with intravaginal branching. The small, erect inflorescences are racemes with very few large spikelets on short pedicels. The spikelets have 4-6 florets, with awns and sometimes lemma lobes exserted from glumes. The florets, like in other Rytidosperma, contain three obvious rows of hairs, one on the callus, and two on the lemmas. The upper lemma hairs are made up of interrupted, dense marginal tufts, which are shorter than lemma lobes, awn columns, and equal or shorter than palea tips. The lower rows is more or less continuous, that overlaps upper lemma hairs. The callus has strong marginal hair tufts overlapping lower lemma hairs.

=== Identification ===
As a Rytidosperma, the easiest way to identify R. buchananii is to select a single floret (which will contain a single awn, two lateral lobes, and usually three rows of hairs - one on the callus and two on the lemma). The arrangement of the hairs, as well as the relative lengths of the awn, lateral lobes, sometimes the callus can help identify to species, using a key such as that found in the New Zealand Flora.

=== Similar species ===
R. petrosum is similar to R. corinum. However, R. corinum has closely short-scabrid rachis' and pedicels (which are virtually glabrous in R. petrosum). The upper lemma hairs are also more or less continuous (but are sparse and irregular in R. petrosum).

It is also similar to R. setifolium, but has longer lemma lobes.

== Biology ==
R. petrosum can produce flowers that are either cleistogamous (flowers that self-pollinate without opening) and chasmogamous (out-crossing flowers), with short and long anthers produced respectively.

It is a tetraploid species (4x), with 2n = 48 chromosomes.

== Threats ==
R. petrosum is classified under the NZTCS as At Risk - Naturally Uncommon nationally, and is Regionally Uncommon in the Wellington Region. It is locally endemic, and threatened at some sites in the Wellington Region by weeds and quarrying. Generally very uncommon throughout its range, but occasionally locally abundant.

== Taxonomy ==
Rytidosperma petrosum was described in 1979 by New Zealand botanists Henry Connor and Elizabeth Edgar under its present name and has no synonyms.

=== Etymology ===
Rytidosperma: 'wrinkled seed' from the Greek 'rhytidos' = wrinkled and 'sperma' = seed

petrosum - from the Latin petrōsus "rocky, stony".
