= Tufted fescue =

Tufted fescue is a common name for several grasses in the genus Festuca and may refer to:

- Festuca airoides
- Festuca amethystina, native to Europe
- Festuca contracta, native to areas in the Southern Ocean

== See also ==
- Festuca occidentalis, a tufted fescue known as western fescue
