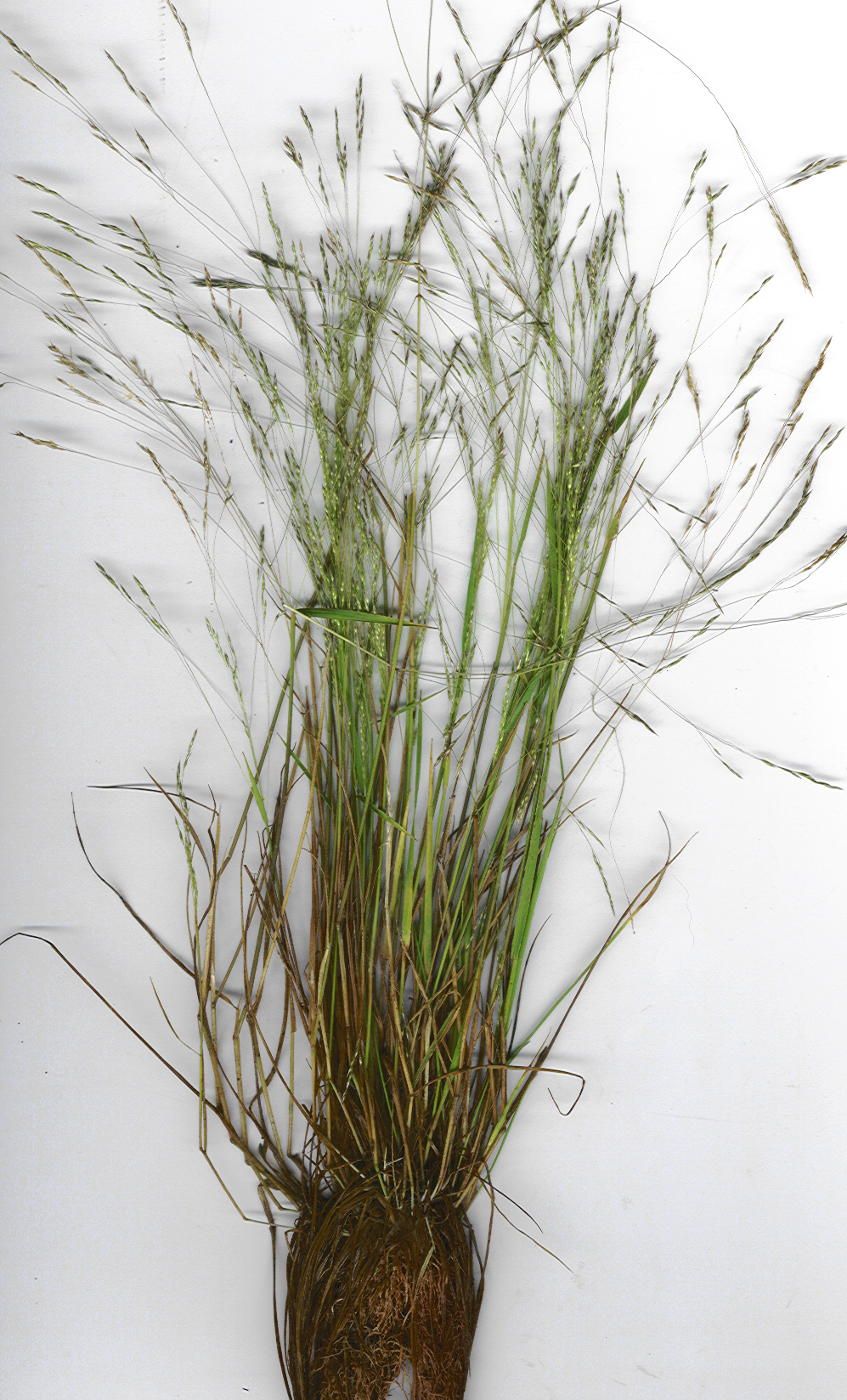

Scientific classification
- Kingdom: Plantae
- Clade: Tracheophytes
- Clade: Angiosperms
- Clade: Monocots
- Clade: Commelinids
- Order: Poales
- Family: Poaceae
- Subfamily: Pooideae
- Genus: Lachnagrostis
- Species: L. filiformis

Binomial name
- Lachnagrostis filiformis (G.Forst.) Trin.

Synonyms
- Agrostis avenacea J.F.Gmel.; Agrostis chamissonis (Trin.) Trin.; Agrostis debilis Poir.; Agrostis filiformis (G.Forst.) Biehler; Agrostis forsteri Rich. ex Roem. & Schult.; Agrostis lasiantha Phil.; Agrostis leonii Parodi; Agrostis ligulata Steud.; Agrostis novae-hollandiae P.Beauv.; Agrostis retrofracta Willd.; Agrostis solandri F.Muell.; Avena filiformis G.Forst.; Calamagrostis avenacea (J.F.Gmel.) W.R.B.Oliv.; Calamagrostis chamissonis (Trin.) Steud.; Calamagrostis filiformis (G.Forst.) Cockayne; Calamagrostis forsteri (Kunth) Steud.; Calamagrostis retrofracta (Willd.) Link ex Steud.; Calamagrostis willdenowii Steud.; Deyeuxia chamissonis (Trin.) Kunth; Deyeuxia filiformis (G.Forst.) Petrie; Deyeuxia filiformis var. aristata (Benth.) Domin; Deyeuxia filiformis var. laeviglumis (Benth.) Domin; Deyeuxia forsteri Kunth; Deyeuxia forsteri var. aristata Benth.; Deyeuxia forsteri var. laeviglumis Benth.; Deyeuxia retrofracta (Willd.) Kunth; Lachnagrostis avenacea (J.F.Gmel.) Veldkamp; Lachnagrostis chamissonis Trin.; Lachnagrostis forsteri Trin.; Lachnagrostis retrofracta (Willd.) Trin.; Lachnagrostis willdenowii Trin.; Vilfa debilis (Poir.) P.Beauv.; Vilfa novae-hollandiae P.Beauv.; Vilfa retrofracta (Willd.) P.Beauv.

= Lachnagrostis filiformis =

Species of grass

Lachnagrostis filiformis (syn. Agrostis avenacea) is a species of grass known by the common names Pacific bent grass, New Zealand wind grass, fairy grass, or blown-grass.

== Description ==
Pacific bent grass is a tufted perennial grass growing up to 65 centimeters tall. The leaf blades are flat and about 8-25 centimeters long and 2-3 millimeters wide. The stems, which are round or polygonal, are hollow. The inflorescence, which appears in June and July, may be from 7-30 centimeters long. It consists of a panicle of wispy strands, each with several tiny, fuzzy spikelets at the end. The spikelets are two or three millimeters long, with geniculate awns and hairy lemmas.

L. filiformis is similar to the L. littoralis, a species endemic to New Zealand. Both species have geniculate awns and intravaginal branching. L. filiformis can be distinguished from the primary and secondary branches of the panicle, which are obviously unequal in length.

== Distribution ==
It is native to Australia, New Zealand, and other Pacific Islands including New Guinea and Easter Island.

In New Zealand, it is scattered throughout the North and South Island, mainly near the coast and on lake margins inland. It is also found on the Kermadec, Three Kings Is., Stewart I., and Chatham Is.

It has been introduced to southern Africa, the United Kingdom, Taiwan, the southern United States and Mexico.

=== Invasiveness ===
Lachnagrostis filiformis is sometimes known as a noxious weed. It is particularly invasive in California, where it is a weed of sensitive vernal pool ecosystems around San Diego.

While L. filiformis is native to Australia, recent climate change induced droughts have caused allowed it to colonise dry lake beds in Victoria, Australia. Its detached seeds have dispersed, accumulating to cause fire hazards and general nuisance in nearby towns. It is also thought to interfere with trains.

In Belgium, L. filiformis has three times been found near grain mills and wool silos, likely having been imported as contaminant from overseas.

== Habitat ==
In New Zealand, L. filiformis is found often of damp ground, such as lake margins, and on disturbed ground and roadsides. It is usually lowland, but occasionally montane. It is also often an urban weed, found in waste land around muddles and in muddy ground. It is thought to have increased its range due following human settlement.

L. filiformis has a high salt tolerance.

== Taxonomy ==
L. filiformis has been known by at least 33 synonyms. The genus name Lachnagrostis means a woolly grass, as in 'lachne' (wool) and 'agrostis' (grass). The 'agrostis' part of the name has often been misattributed to be referring to the genus Agrostis. The name filiformis comes from the Latin filum ‘thread’ and forma ‘shape’, and thus means 'thread-shaped'.

== See also ==
- Invasive species
- Grasses of New Zealand
- List of grasses of New Zealand
- Lachnagrostis
