= Lachnagrostis limitanea =

Scientific classification
- Kingdom: Plantae
- Clade: Tracheophytes
- Clade: Angiosperms
- Clade: Monocots
- Clade: Commelinids
- Order: Poales
- Family: Poaceae
- Subfamily: Pooideae
- Genus: Lachnagrostis
- Species: L. limitanea

Binomial name
- Lachnagrostis limitanea (J.M.Black) S.W.L.Jacobs

Species of plant

Lachnagrostis limitanea (syn. Agrostis limitanea, Spalding blown grass) is a threatened plant native to South Australia.
