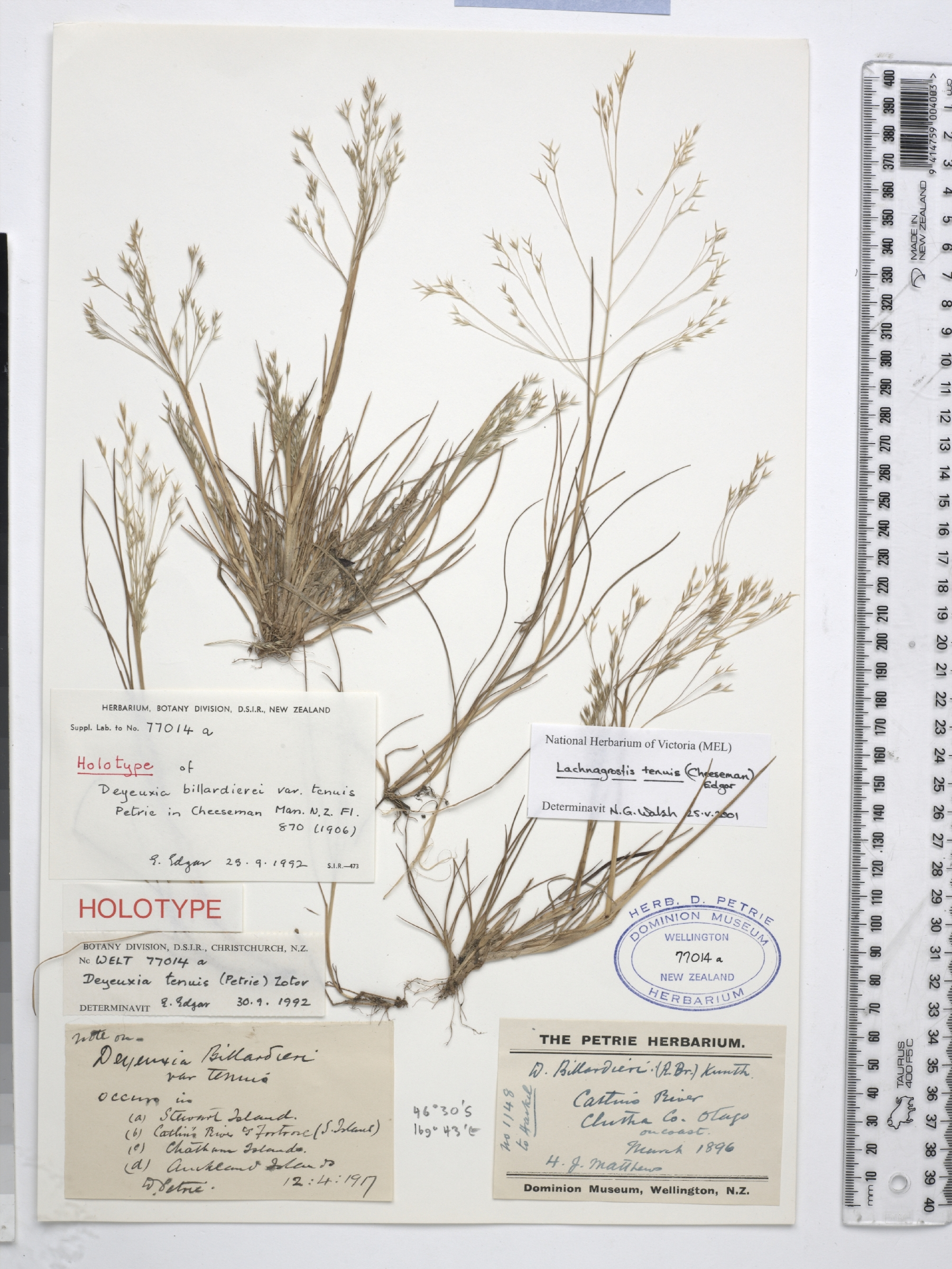

Scientific classification
- Kingdom: Plantae
- Clade: Tracheophytes
- Clade: Angiosperms
- Clade: Monocots
- Clade: Commelinids
- Order: Poales
- Family: Poaceae
- Subfamily: Pooideae
- Genus: Lachnagrostis
- Species: L. tenuis

Binomial name
- Lachnagrostis tenuis (Cheeseman) Edgar

= Lachnagrostis tenuis =

Species of plant

Lachnagrostis tenuis, commonly known as wind grass, is a species of plant in the true grass family. It is endemic to coastal areas of Stewart Island and the South Island of New Zealand from Christchurch to Bluff.

== Description ==
L. tenuis is a stiff, tufted grass, with thin (0.3-0.9 mm diameter), inrolled leaf-blades, 2–12 cm in length. Spikelets contain a single floret with hairless lemmas and geniculate awns.

L. tenuis is easily separated from most New Zealand Lachnagrostis by its hairless lemmas and geniculate awns, which rules out all other species but L. billardierei. From this species, it can be distinguished by its stiff, inrolled leaves, and short spikelets (3-5mm long, versus 4-5-6mm long).

== Distribution ==
L. tenuis is a local endemic of the eastern Canterbury and Otago coast, as well as Stewart Island. In Canterbury, it is found in South Brighton and Teddington. In Otago and Southland, it is known from the Otago Peninsula, the Catlins, Bluff, and Stewart Island.

One possible record was collected from the Auckland Islands, but is generally considered doughtful, and is not included in the Flora.

== Habitat ==
Coastal, on slopes, as well as salt marsh and tidal flats. It prefers slightly vegetated, raised, sandy ground, and is often associated with Selliera radicans.

== Threats ==
L. tenuis is a local endemic, threatened by grazing and competition with exotic salt marsh grasses, such as Agrostis stolonifera and Elymus sp.

It is designated as Threataned - Nationally Vulnerable. It was given the qualifiers CI (Climate Impact), DPR (Data Poor Recognition), EF (Extreme Fluctuations), and RR (Range Restricted).

== See also ==
- Lachnagrostis
- Grasses of New Zealand
- List of grasses of New Zealand

== Photos ==
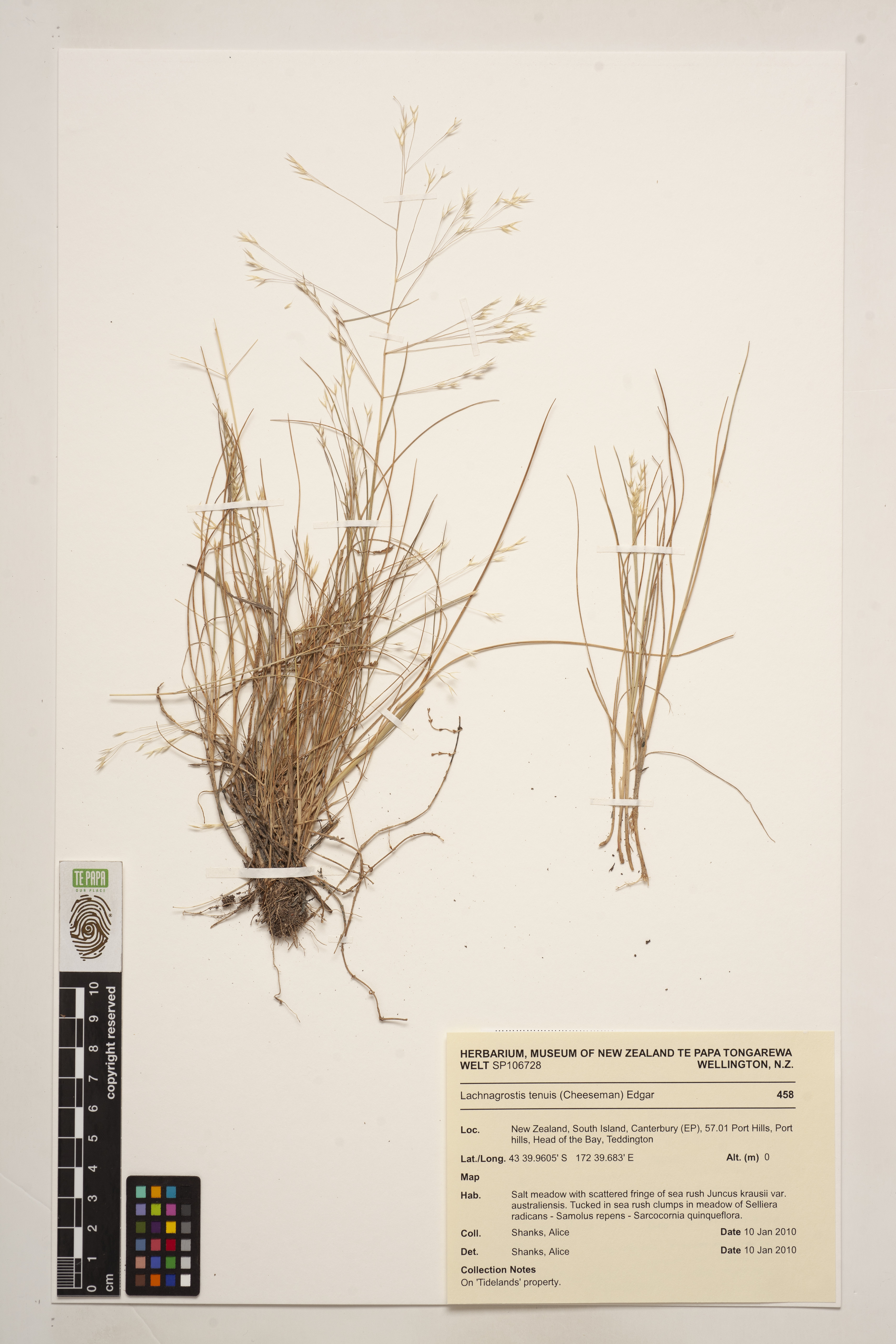
L. tenuis specimen
