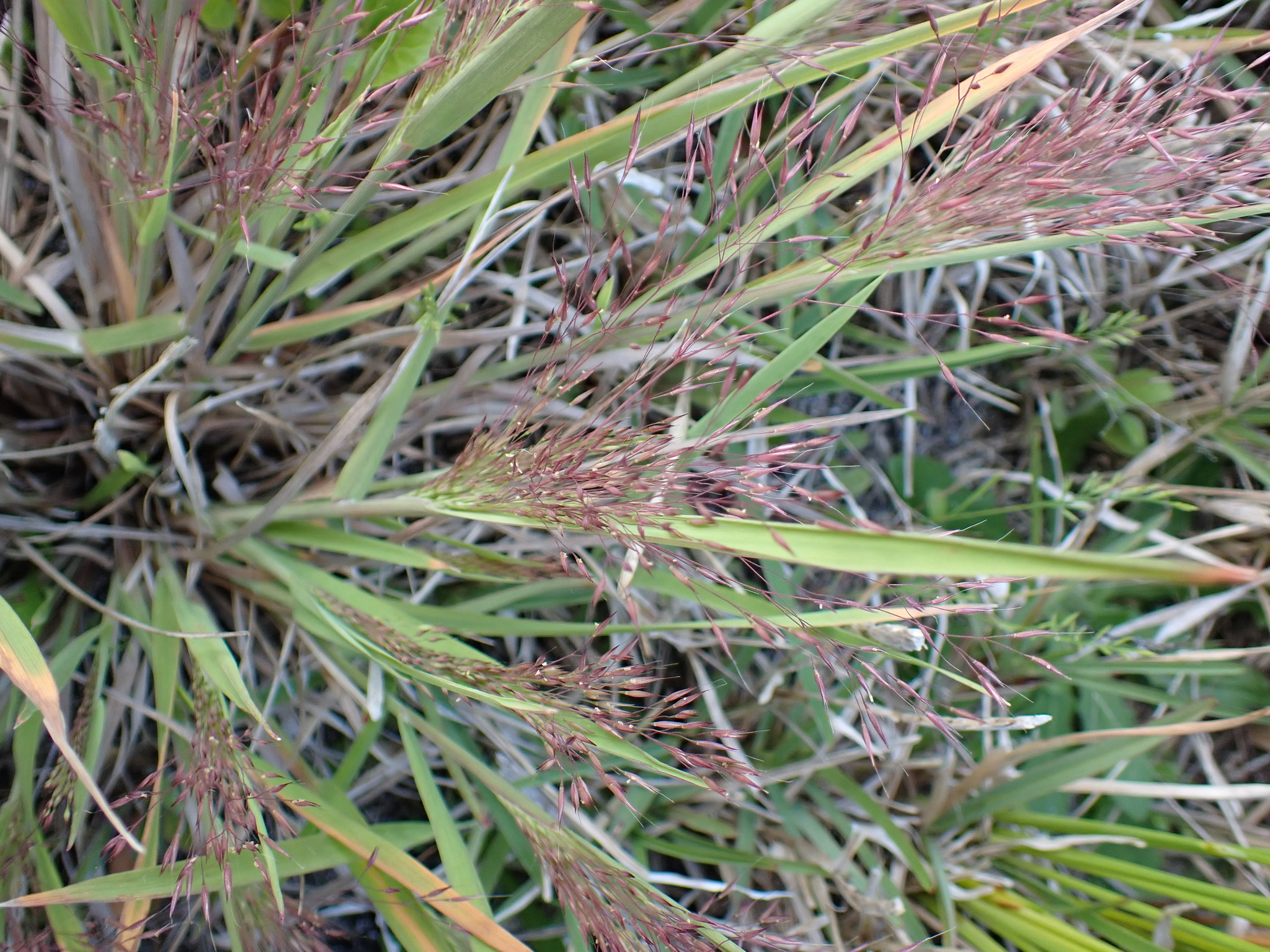

Scientific classification
- Kingdom: Plantae
- Clade: Tracheophytes
- Clade: Angiosperms
- Clade: Monocots
- Clade: Commelinids
- Order: Poales
- Family: Poaceae
- Subfamily: Pooideae
- Supertribe: Poodae
- Tribe: Poeae
- Subtribe: Agrostidinae
- Genus: Lachnagrostis; Trin.

Type species
- Lachnagrostis filiformis (G.Forst.) Trin.

Synonyms
- Agrostis sect. Lachnagrostis (Trin.) E. Desv.

= Lachnagrostis =

Genus of grasses

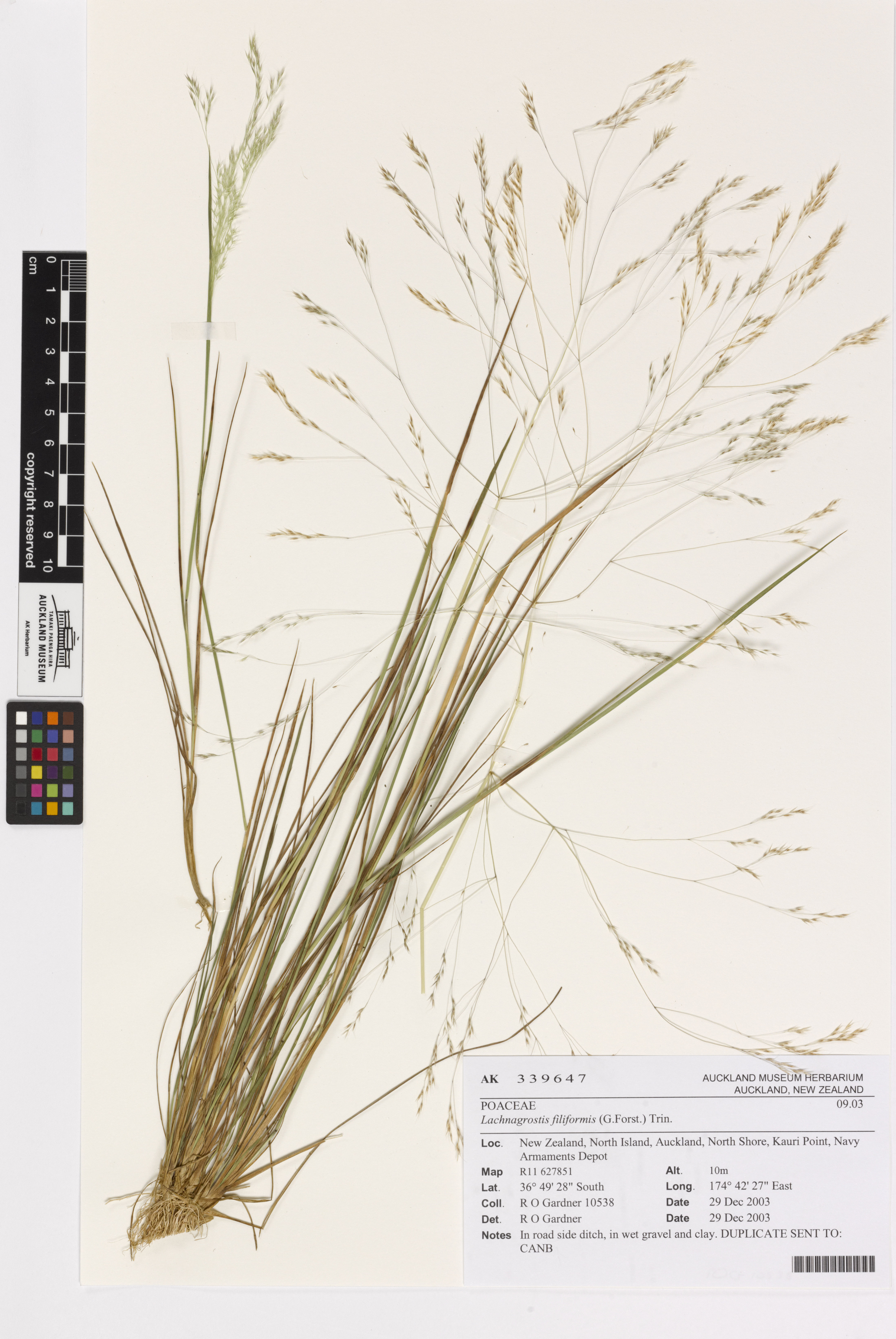
The type species; Lachnagrostis filiformis

Lachnagrostis is a genus of African, Australian, Pacific Island, and South American plants in the grass family. They are often treated as members of genus Agrostis.

Lachnagrostis contains 38 accepted species, of which, the majority are found Australia and New Zealand. Australia is home to 21 species, and New Zealand is home to 12 species, 10 of which are endemics.

== Species ==
Sources:

- Lachnagrostis adamsonii - Victoria
- Lachnagrostis aemula - Australia incl Lord Howe I
- Lachnagrostis ammobia - New Zealand (South)
- Lachnagrostis barbuligera - South Africa, Lesotho, Eswatini
- Lachnagrostis billardierei - Australia, New Zealand (North+ South+ Chatham Is)
- Lachnagrostis collicola - Tasmania
- Lachnagrostis deflexa - Victoria
- Lachnagrostis distans - South Australia
- Lachnagrostis drummondiana - Western Australia
- Lachnagrostis elata - New Zealand (North+ South)
- Lachnagrostis eriantha - South Africa
- Lachnagrostis filiformis - Australia (incl Norfolk I), New Guinea, Lesser Sunda Is, New Zealand (North+ South + Antipodes+ Chatham + Kermadec Is), Easter I; naturalized in South Africa, Taiwan, scattered locales in the Americas
- Lachnagrostis glabra - New Zealand (North)
- Lachnagrostis huttoniae - South Africa
- Lachnagrostis lachnantha - Yemen, eastern + southern Africa from Eritrea to Cape Province
- Lachnagrostis lacunis - Tasmania
- Lachnagrostis leptostachys - New Zealand (Antipodes)
- Lachnagrostis leviseta - Victoria
- Lachnagrostis limitanea - South Australia
- Lachnagrostis littoralis - New Zealand (North+ South+ Chatham + Kermadec Is)
- Lachnagrostis lyallii - New Zealand (North+ South+ Chatham Is)
- Lachnagrostis meionectes- Victoria, New South Wales
- Lachnagrostis morrisii - Tasmania
- Lachnagrostis nesomytica - Western Australia
- Lachnagrostis palustris - South Australia, Victoria
- Lachnagrostis perennis - South Australia
- Lachnagrostis pilosa - New Zealand (North+ South+ Antipodes + Chatham Is)
- Lachnagrostis plebeia - Western Australia, South Australia
- Lachnagrostis polypogonoides - South Africa
- Lachnagrostis preissii - Western Australia
- Lachnagrostis robusta - South Australia, Victoria, and Tasmania
- Lachnagrostis rudis - South Australia, Victoria, New South Wales, Tasmania
- Lachnagrostis schlechteri - Cape Province of South Africa
- Lachnagrostis semibarbata - South Australia, Victoria, Tasmania
- Lachnagrostis sodiroana - Ecuador, Peru
- Lachnagrostis striata - New Zealand (North + South)
- Lachnagrostis tenuis - New Zealand (South)
- Lachnagrostis uda - New Zealand (South)

=== Hybrids ===
- Lachnagrostis × contracta - Victoria (L. adamsonii × L. deflexa)
- Lachnagrostis × ripulae - Victoria (L. filiformis × L. rudis)

formerly included

see Agrostis Calamagrostis Gastridium Triplachne

- Lachnagrostis australis - Calamagrostis australis
- Lachnagrostis ciliata - Agrostis pilosula
- Lachnagrostis griffithiana - Agrostis griffithiana
- Lachnagrostis gussonis - Triplachne nitens
- Lachnagrostis hookeri - Agrostis pilosula
- Lachnagrostis hookeriana - Agrostis pilosula
- Lachnagrostis phleoides - Gastridium phleoides
- Lachnagrostis royleana - Agrostis pilosula
- Lachnagrostis roylei - Agrostis pilosula
- Lachnagrostis scabra Nees ex Steud. 1820 not A.J.Br. 2006 - Agrostis pilosula
- Lachnagrostis willdenowii Nees 1843 not Trin. 1824 - Agrostis venusta
