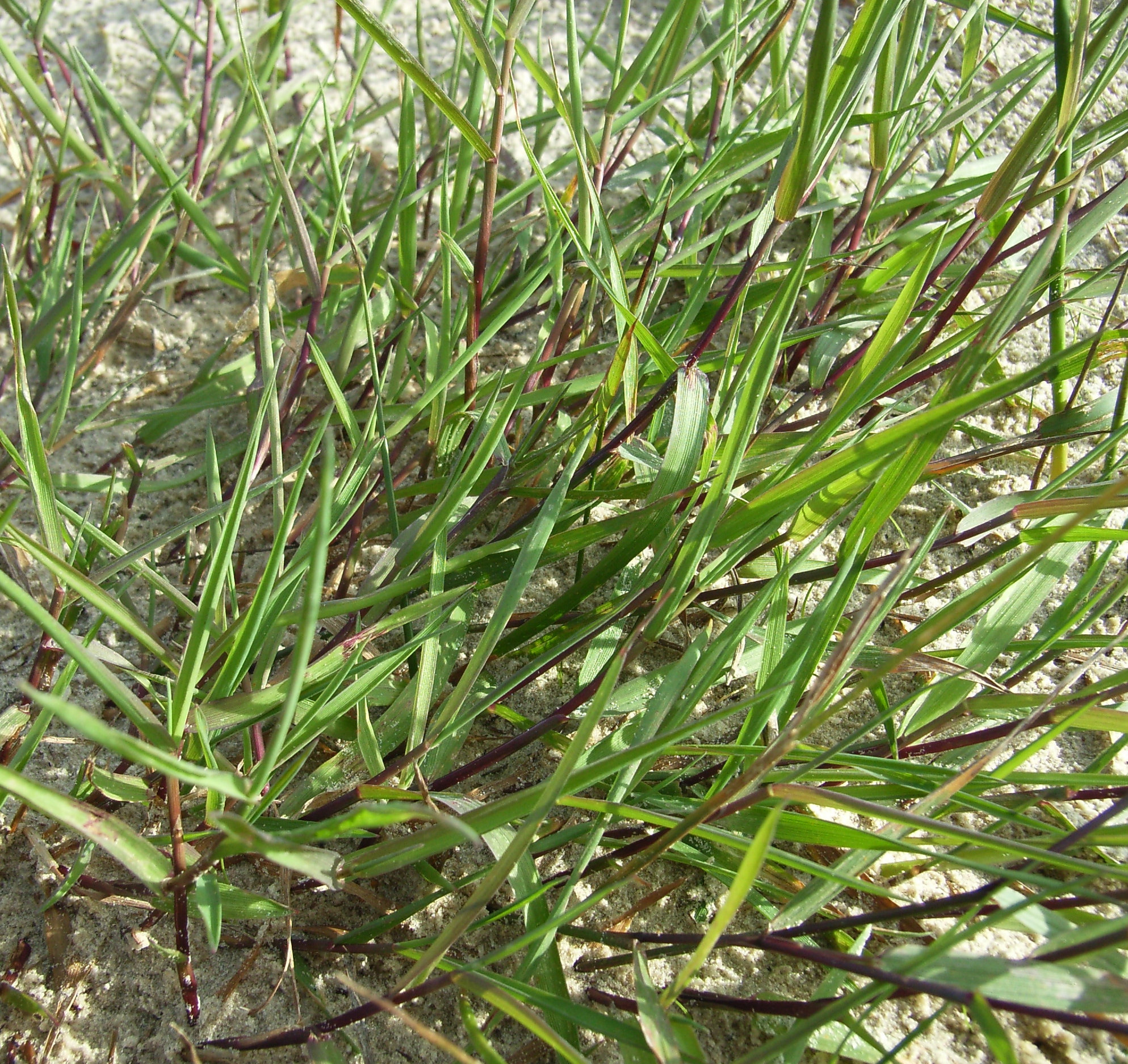

Conservation status
- Least Concern (IUCN 3.1)

- Secure (NatureServe)

Scientific classification
- Kingdom: Plantae
- Clade: Embryophytes
- Clade: Tracheophytes
- Clade: Angiosperms
- Clade: Monocots
- Clade: Commelinids
- Order: Poales
- Family: Poaceae
- Subfamily: Pooideae
- Genus: Agrostis
- Species: A. stolonifera

Binomial name
- Agrostis stolonifera L., 1753

Synonyms
- List: Agrostis adscendens Lange; Agrostis alba L. var. palustris (Huds.) Pers.; Agrostis alba L. var. stolonifera (L.) Sm.; Agrostis capillaris Pollich; Agrostis filifolia Link; Agrostis karsensis Litv.; Agrostis maritima Lam.; Agrostis palustris Huds.; Agrostis stolonifera L. subsp. prorepens Koch; Agrostis stolonifera L. var. compacta Hartm.; Agrostis stolonifera L. var. palustris (Huds.) Farw.; Agrostis stolonizans Schult. & Schult. f.; Agrostis straminea Hartm.; Agrostis zerovii Klokov

= Agrostis stolonifera =

Species of grass

Agrostis stolonifera (creeping bentgrass, creeping bent, fiorin, spreading bent or carpet bentgrass) is a perennial grass species in the family Poaceae. It is widely used as turf for golf courses. It flowers in spring and summer months.

== Description ==
Agrostis stolonifera is stoloniferous and may form mats or tufts. The prostrate stems of this species grow to 0.4–1.0 metre (1 ft 4 in – 3 ft 3 in) long with 2–10-centimetre (0.79–3.94 in) long leaf blades and a panicle reaching up to 40 cm (16 in) in height.

The ligule is pointed and up to 5 millimetres (0.20 in) long. This differs from common bent, Agrostis capillaris, which is short and does not come to a point.

The leaves are tapering, often with a blue-grey colour. The grass is not tufted and the spikelets are red and tightly closed within the panicle.

Where ranges overlap, A. stolonifera is easily confused with the stoloniferous A. gigantea and A. castellana. From those species, it can be distinguished by its thinner panicle (0.5-2.5cm wide, versus 4-8cm wide). In New Zealand, it is suspected to hybridise with A. castellana, complicating identification.

A. stolonifera and Polypogon monspesulensis are the parents of the sterile intergeneric hybrid ×Agropogon lutosus. From A. stolonifera, ×Agropogon differs by its awned lemmas. From P. monspesulensis, ×Agropogon differs in having more persistent spikelets, and lemmas with subterminal awns.

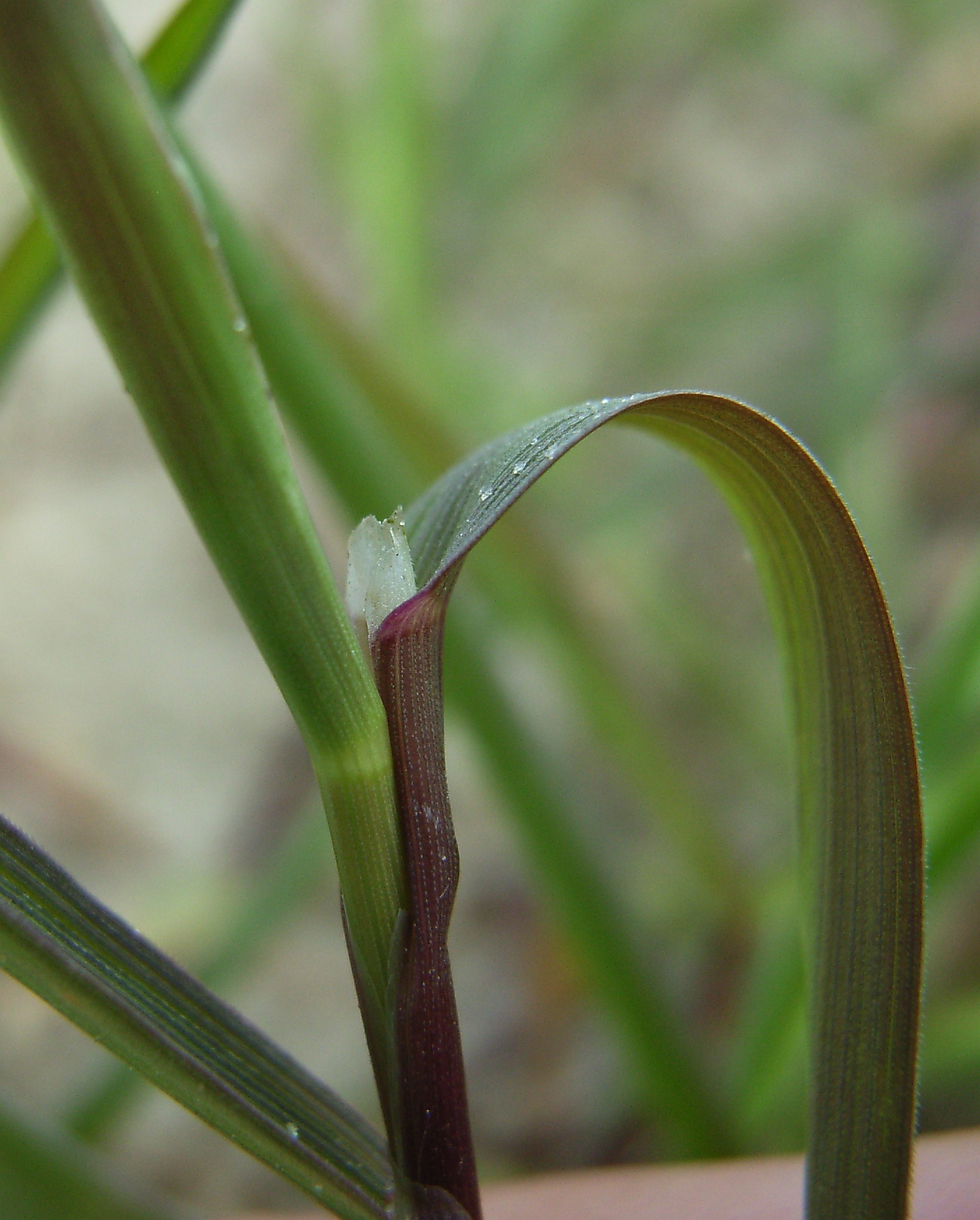
ligule is pointed up to 5mm long

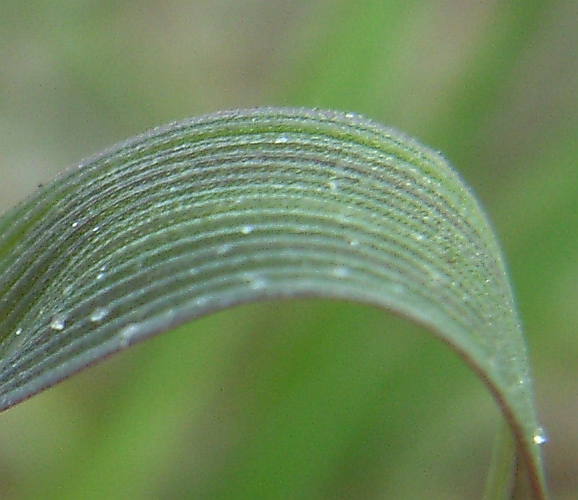
leaf blade

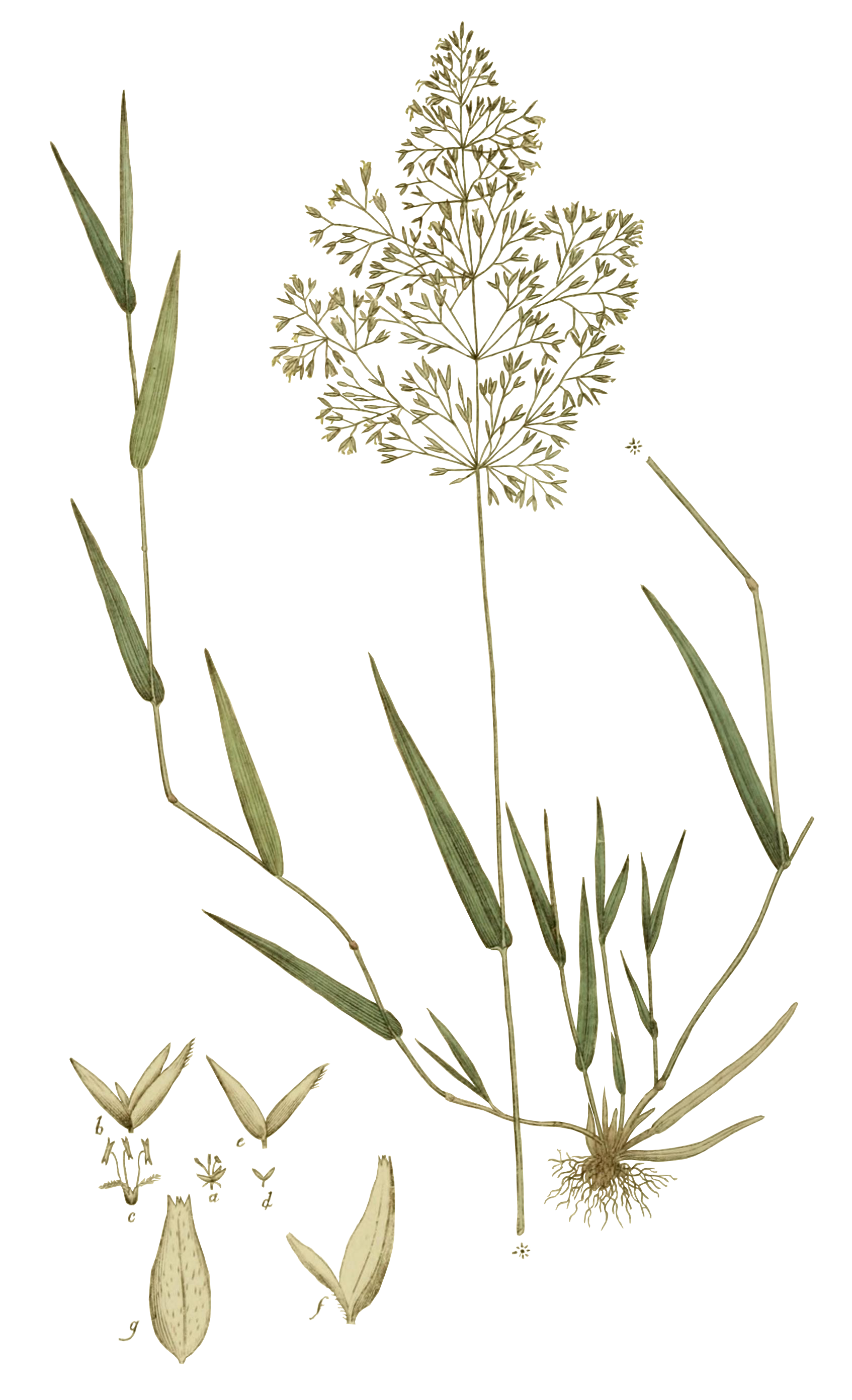
Inflorescence

== Distribution ==
A. stolonifera is native to Eurasia and North Africa (Algeria, Morocco and Tunisia). It is possible that it may also be native to northern parts of North America, and in any case it has been widely introduced and naturalised on that continent and in many other places.

In New Zealand, Agrostis stolonifera naturalised in 1878, and is widespread throughout both main islands, as well as Chatham Islands, Auckland Islands, and Campbell Island. As a weed of wetland areas, it competes with the Threatened - Nationally Vulnerable Lachnagrostis tenuis, and the At Risk - Declining Amphibromus fluitans.

== Habitat ==
It can be found growing in a variety of habitats including woodlands, grasslands and meadows, wetlands, riparian zones, and as a pioneer species on disturbed sites.

In New Zealand, A. stolonifera is recognised as a Facultative Wetland plant, meaning that it is usually associated with wetlands and aquatic habitats. It can exist up to 2,500 feet (760 m).

== Cultivation ==
It is the most commonly used species of Agrostis.

It is used for turf in gardens and landscapes, particularly on golf courses. Many of the putting greens as well as an increasing number of fairways in the northern United States are creeping bentgrass.

== Transgenic varieties ==
In the 1990s, Scotts Miracle-Gro and Monsanto looked to produce glyphosate-resistant creeping bentgrass through an early use of transgenics. Plants were grown in the open at an experimental farm in Oregon in 2003. This led to the accidental establishment of uncontrolled feral populations through windborne seeds and pollen. Scotts Miracle-Gro was fined $500,000 as a result. In 2017, the USDA agreed not to regulate it at Scotts request, which meant that Scotts "will no longer be legally required to pay to clean up the grass after 2017, though it has promised to do so." A 2004 study documented gene flow of transgenic plants on a landscape level, with sentinel and resident plants observed by scientist at a maximum at 21 kilometres (13 mi) and 14 km (8.7 mi) (respectively), located in primarily nonagronomic places such as irrigation ditches. Subsequently, a 2017 study found that despite mitigation efforts, the transgene was still present in feral populations of the A. stolonifera. Furthermore, it found that transgenic A. stolonifera had hybridised with A. gigantea and Polypogon monspeliensis, producing potentially transgenic hybrid offspring. Hybrids between A. stolonifera and A. gigantea are fertile, raising the possibility that the transgene could spread into populations of A. gigantea. However, intergeneric hybrids with Polypogon monspeliensis (called ×Agropogon) are thought to be sterile.

Other work in transgenic bentgrass looks into salinity tolerance. The improved performance of the transgenic plants was associated with higher relative water content, higher sodium uptake and lower solute leakage in leaf tissues, with higher concentrations of Na+, K+, Cl- and total phosphorus in root tissues, and with higher auxin accumulation rate in the root tissue. This transgenic plant can survive in the presence of 1.7% sodium chloride (half seawater salinity concentration), while the non transgenic line and wild type plants cannot.
