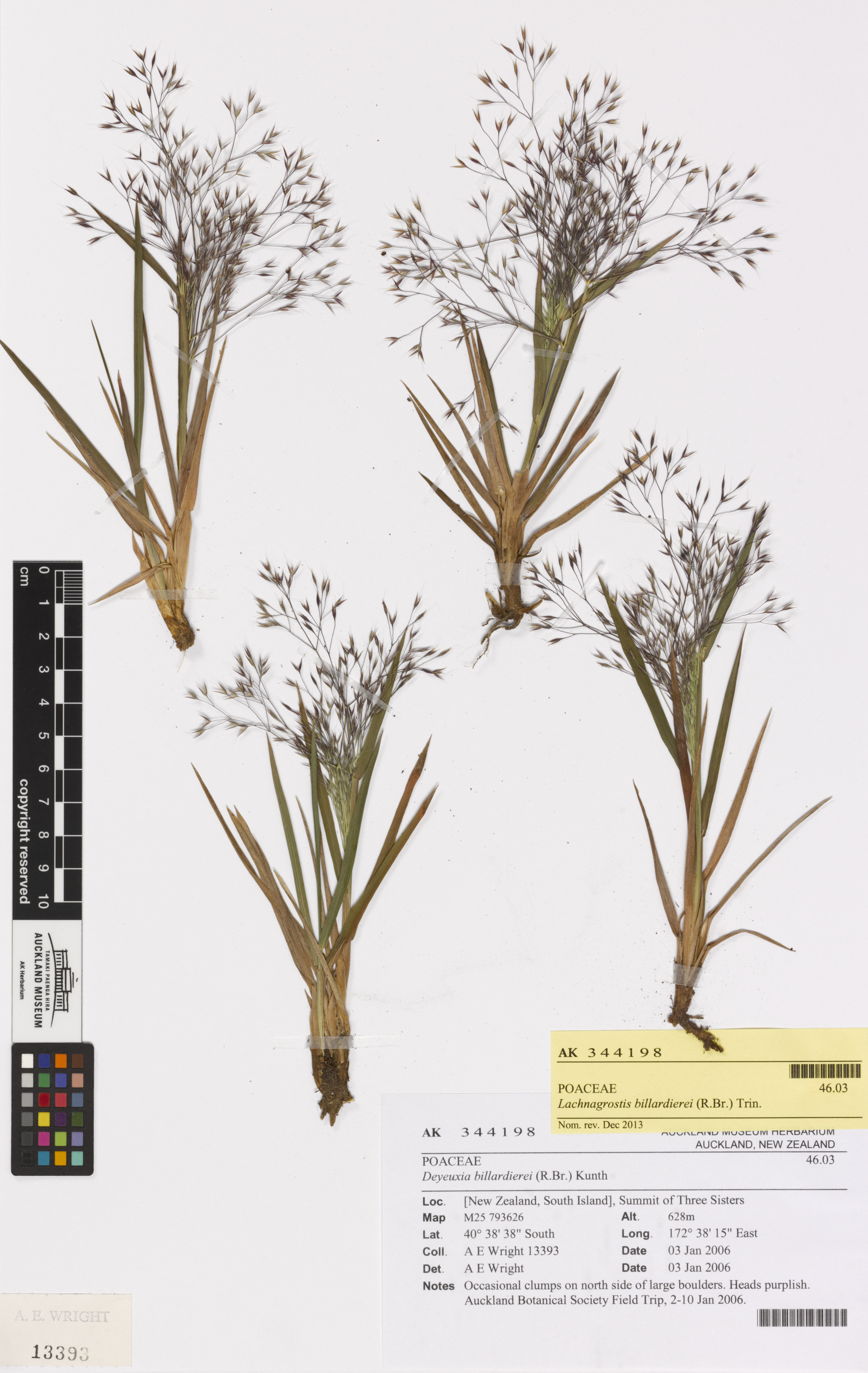
- Specimen growing in Kiritehere Beach, North Island of New Zealand

Conservation status
- Not Threatened (NZ TCS)

Scientific classification
- Kingdom: Plantae
- Clade: Embryophytes
- Clade: Tracheophytes
- Clade: Angiosperms
- Clade: Monocots
- Clade: Commelinids
- Order: Poales
- Family: Poaceae
- Subfamily: Pooideae
- Genus: Lachnagrostis
- Species: L. billardierei

Binomial name
- Lachnagrostis billardierei (R.Br.) Trin.

Subspecies
- L. b. subsp. billardierei; L. b. subsp. tenuiseta (D.Morris) S.W.L.Jacobs

Synonyms
- Agrostis billardierei R.Br.; Deyeuxia billardierei (R.Br.) Kunth.; Calamagrostis billardierei (R.Br.) Steud.

= Lachnagrostis billardierei =

Species of plant

Lachnagrostis billardierei, commonly known as coast blown-grass or sand wind grass, is a species of plant in the true grass family. It is found in largely coastal areas in New Zealand and Australia.

== Description ==
A. billardierei is a tufted perennial grass, with glaucous to bluish-green leaves, about 50 cm in height. It forms circular tufts of leaf blades and straw-coloured flowers. The seeds are wind-dispersed.

In New Zealand, L. billardierei could be confused with two other coastal Lachnagrostis; L. pilosa subsp. pilosa, or L. tenuis, both of which are nationally endemic. From L. pilosa subsp. pilosa, L. billardierei can be distinguished by its hairless lemmas. From L. tenuis, the most similar species, L. billardierei can be distinguished by its 2.5-6-10 mm wide, flat leaf-blades, and its longer spikelets (4-5-6 mm), in comparison to the 0.3-0.9 mm, inrolled leaves, and 3-5 mm spikelets of L. tenuis.

The two subspecies can be distinguished by the length of the awns:

- L. b. subsp. billardierei: awns are >3.5mm, and longer than glumes.
- L. b. subsp. tenuiseta, awns are <2mm, and not or hardly longer than glumes.

== Distribution ==
Its principal area of occurrence is south-eastern Australia and New Zealand, though there are also records from the Warren IBRA bioregion of south-western Western Australia.

Two subspecies are recognised:

- L. b. subsp. billardierei a subspecies from Tasmania, New South Wales, Victoria, and South Australia.
- L. b. subsp. tenuiseta, or small-awned blown-grass, a subspecies once thought to be endemic to the east coast of Tasmania and Whitemark Island, but which has been identified from three herbarium specimens in New Zealand.

== Habitat ==
L. billardierei is a mainly coastal species, with a few inland records mainly in Australia. Coastal habitats include sand dunes, cobble and boulder beaches, cliff faces, coastal lagoon and pond edges, and free draining estuarine river banks. In New Zealand, it occasionally occurs well inland on limestone or calcareous sandstone bluffs.

== Taxonomy ==
Lachnagrostis billardierei has three synonyms. It was originally described in 1810 as Agrostis billardierei R.Br., in the Prodromus Flora Novae Hollandiae. Following this, it has been recognised as a Lachnagrostis in 1820, Deyeuxia in 1829, and Calamagrostis in 1840. Presently, it is recognised as Lachagrostis billardierei (R.Br.) Trin.

The genus name means “woolly agrostis” with reference to the closely related genus Agrostis; the specific epithet billardierei honours French botanist Jacques Labillardière (1755–1834).

== Photos ==
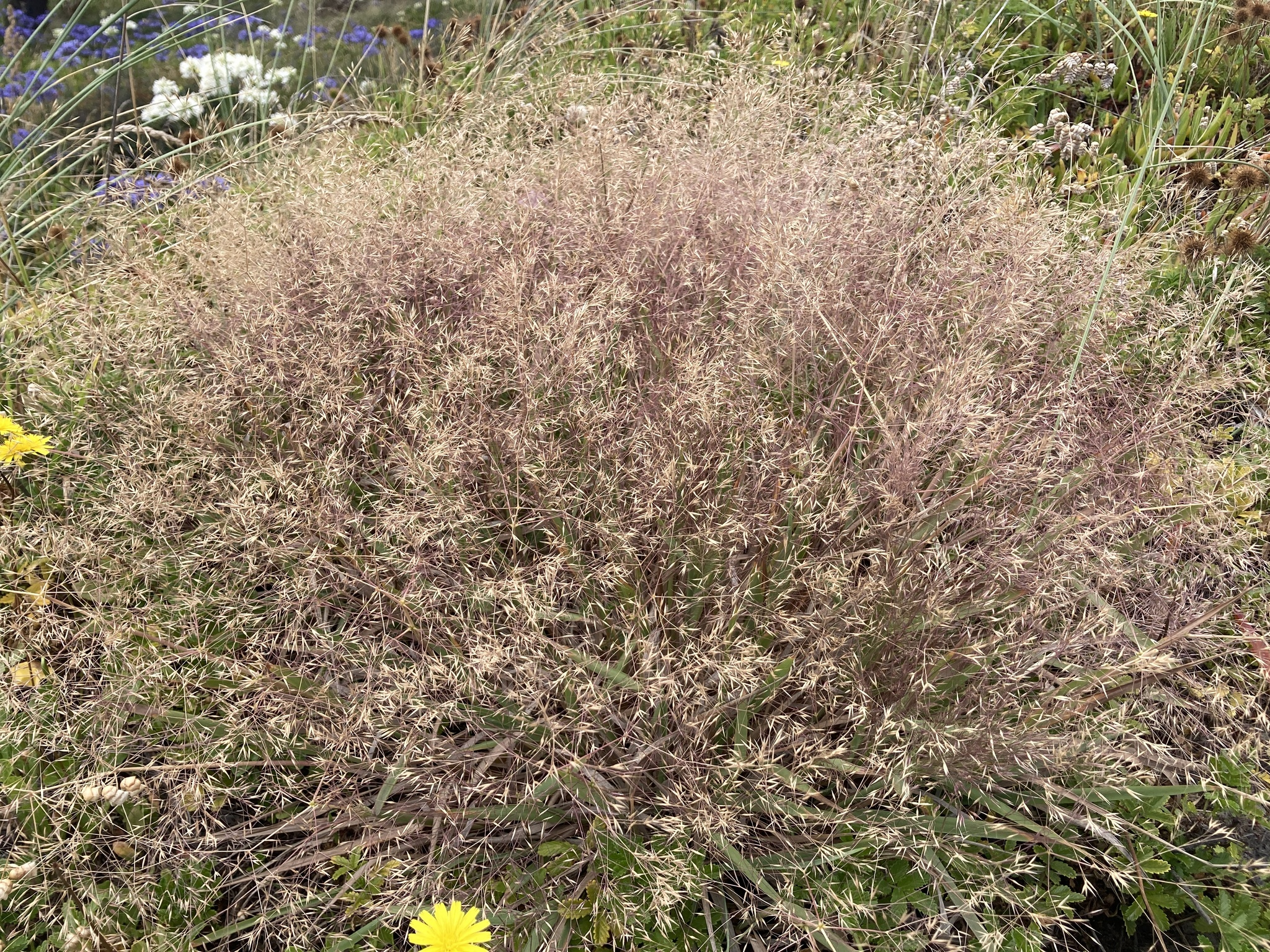
Profile

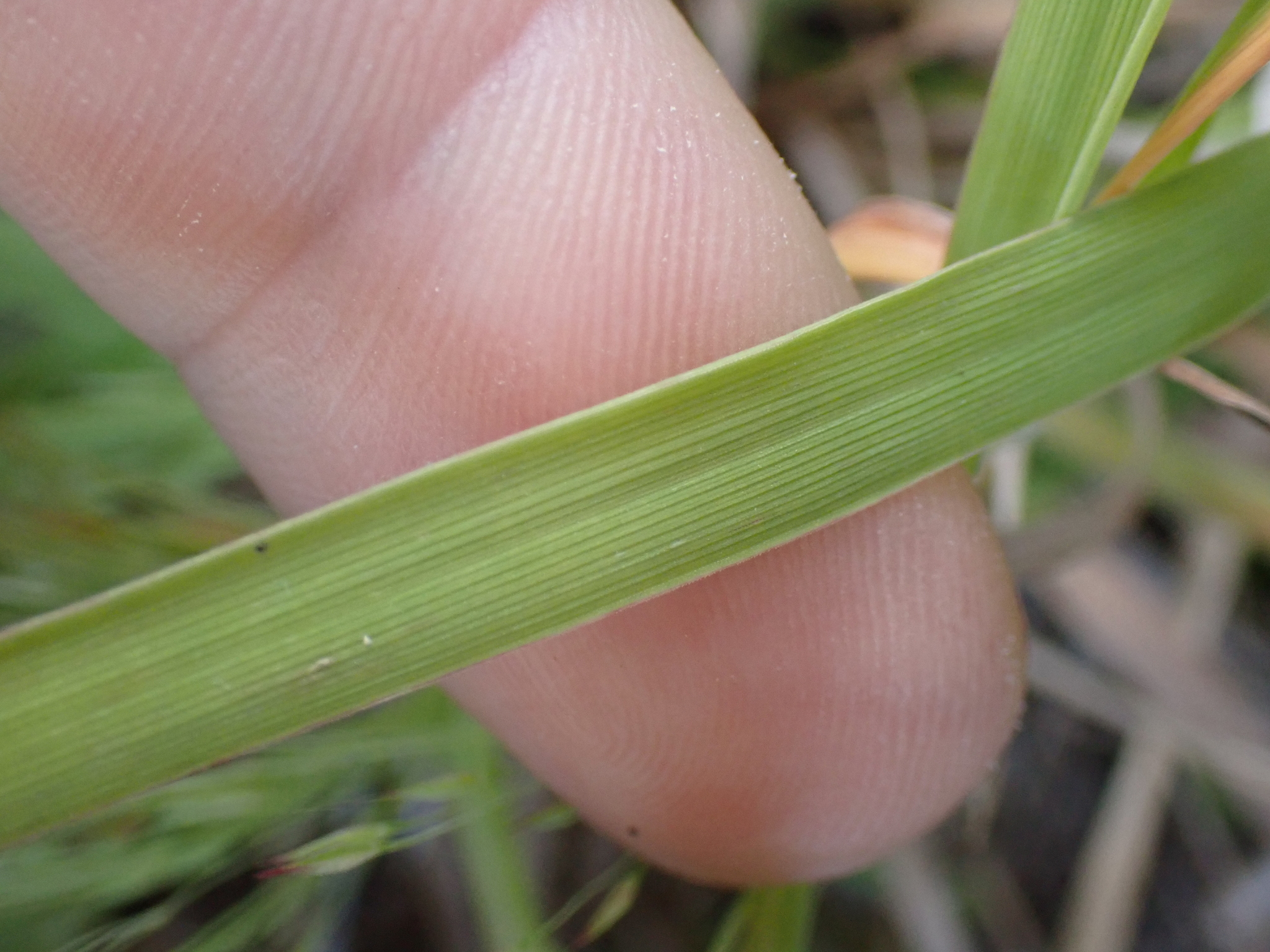
Leaf-blade

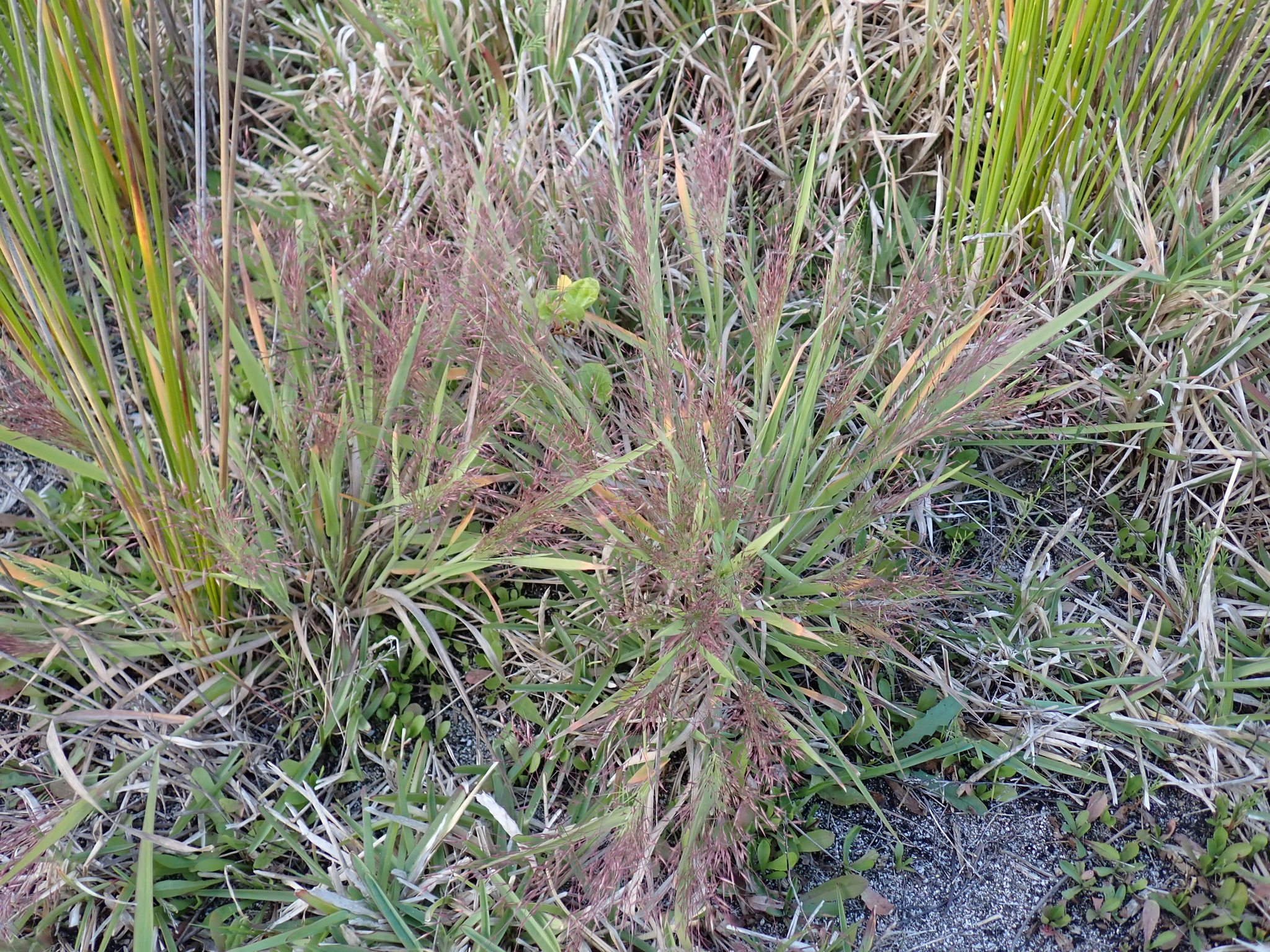
Flowering on sand

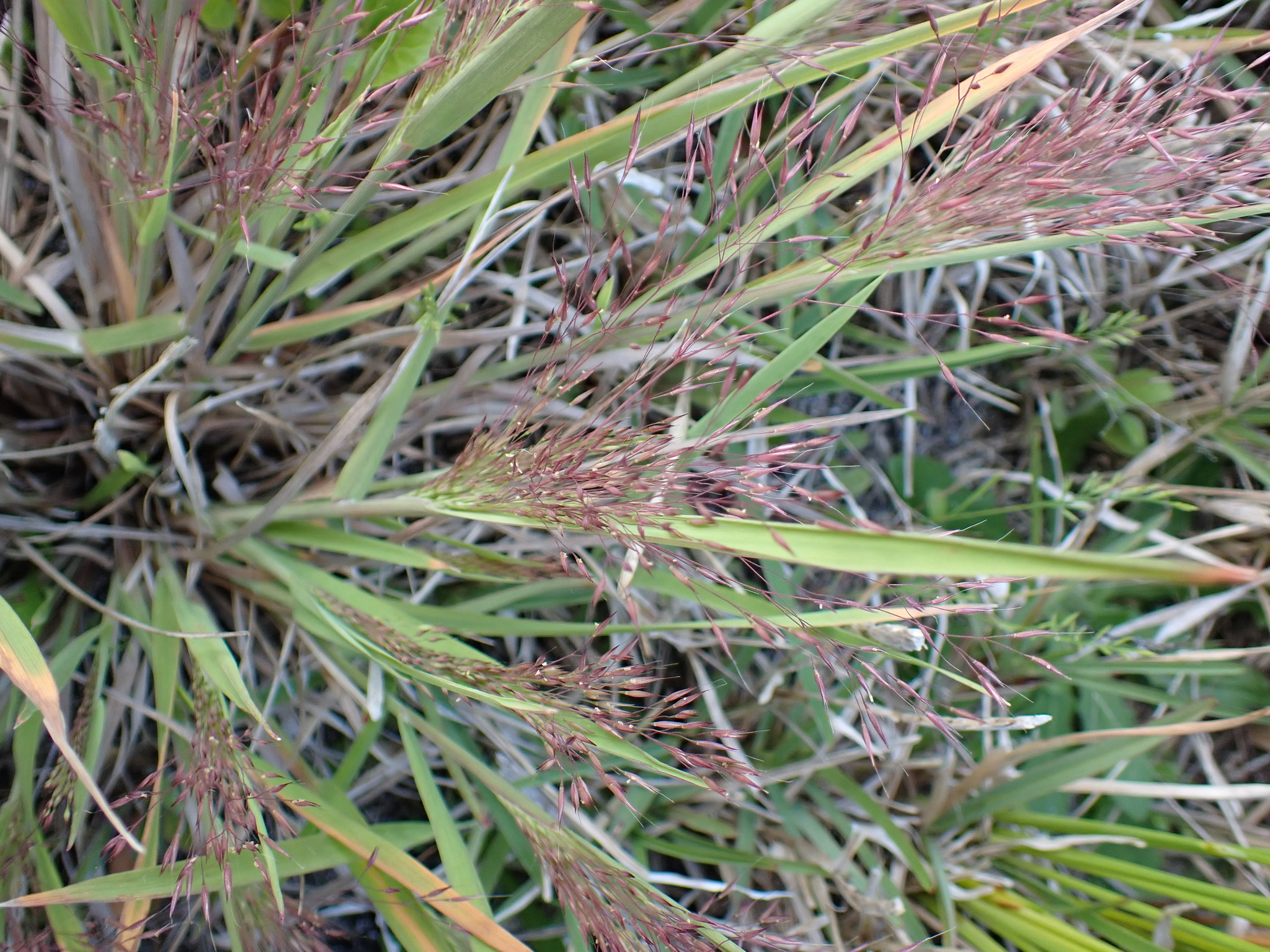
Flowers close-up

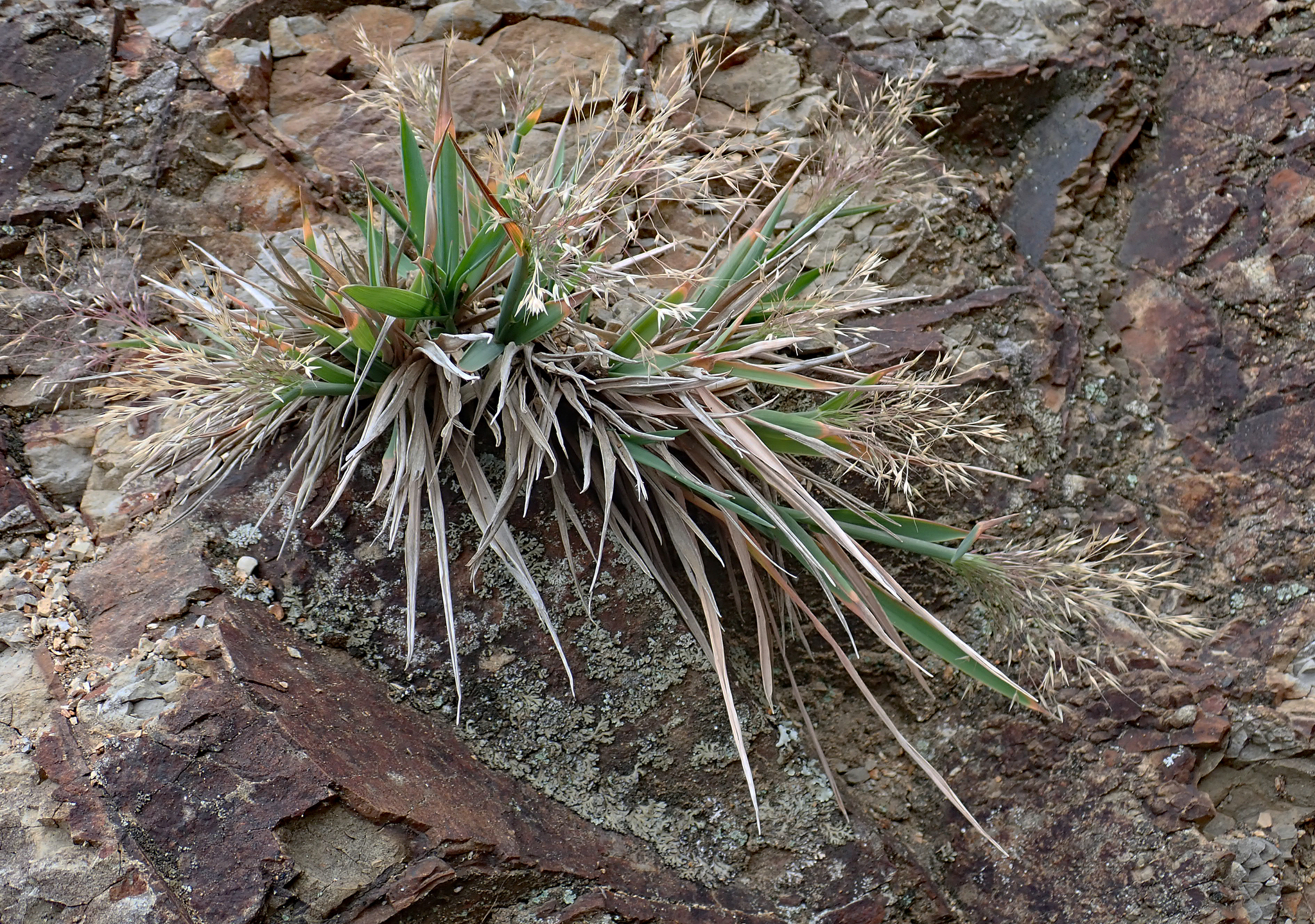
L. billardierei in rocky habitat.
