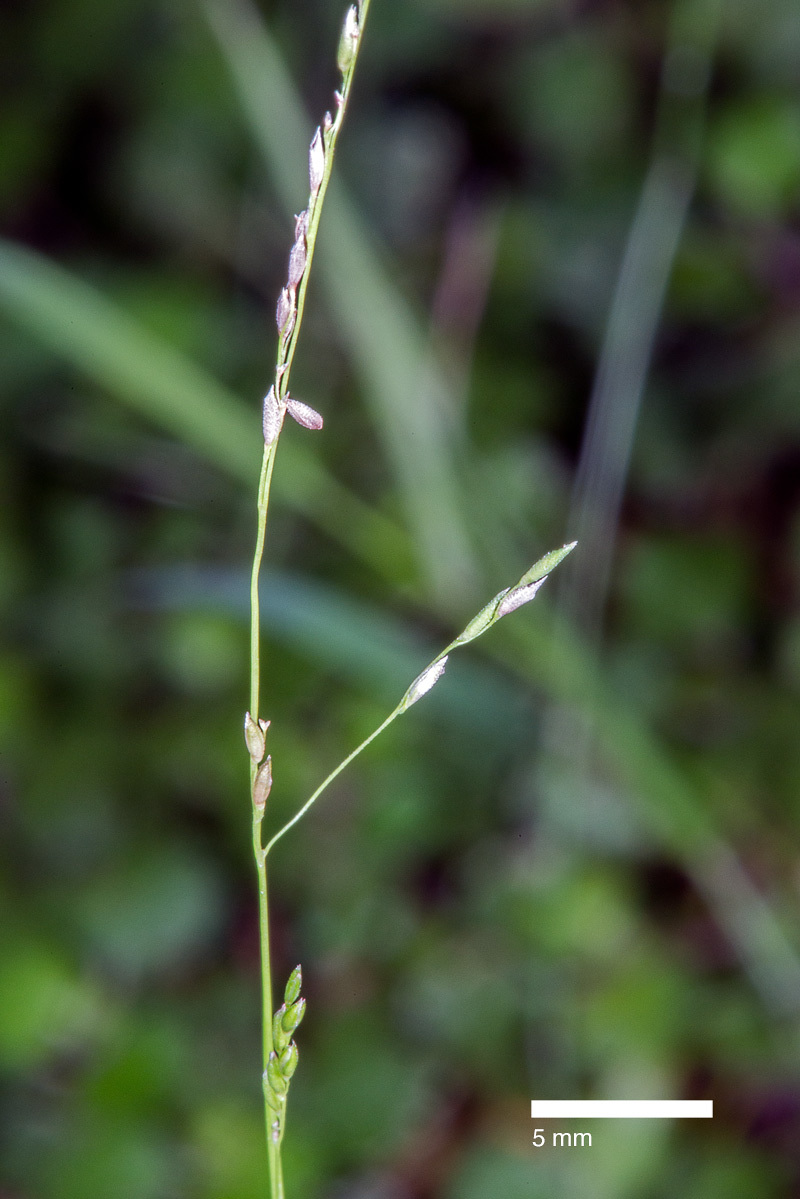

Conservation status
- Nationally Critical (NZ TCS)

Scientific classification
- Kingdom: Plantae
- Clade: Tracheophytes
- Clade: Angiosperms
- Clade: Monocots
- Clade: Commelinids
- Order: Poales
- Family: Poaceae
- Subfamily: Pooideae
- Genus: Simplicia
- Species: S. felix

Binomial name
- Simplicia felix de Lange, J.R.Rolfe, Smissen & Ogle

= Simplicia felix =

Species of plant

Simplicia felix is a rare, recently described species of true grass in the tribe Poeae from New Zealand. It was first described in 2016 by de Lange et al.

== Description ==
A short, flaccid, stoloniferous grass, forming sprawling patches up to 1 m wide. Panicles are small and delicate, with branches appressed to the rachis. Spikelets are 2.7–3 mm long, bright green, and contain a single floret.

S. felix differs from S. laxa by the dark brown, ribbed leaf sheaths; by the mostly glabrous, ribbed mid-stem and upper-stem; the longer culm internodes and shorter panicles (<80mm long) with scabrid branches; the narrower, glabrous leaves; and the minutely scabrid lemma and smaller, thin rachilla with cilia only at the apex.

S. felix differs from S. buchananii which has lax, sprawling rather than erect culms, linear-pyramidal inflorescences with reflexed lower braches rather than branches appressed to the rachis.

== Distribution ==
Simplicia felix is endemic to New Zealand. In the North Island, it is found near Taihape, and in several locations throughout the Wairarapa. In the South Island, it is found in one location in Northern Otago.

The type specimen is from Te Kanuka Farm Station, Kaumingi Stream, in Eastern Wairarapa.

== Habitat ==
S. felix is found from lowland to lower montane environments, often banks of rivers in seasonally dry podocarp forests on basic soils such as limestone, mudstone, and siltstone. In one location in Otago, it is found in a limestone overhang.

In the Taihape-Rangitikei area, S. felix is associated with other indigenous grasses and herbs, such as Echinopogon ovatus, Poa imbecilla, Poa matthewsii, Cardamine sp., and Oxalis exilis. In the Wairarapa, it is associated with the same species, as well as Arthropodium candidum, Australina pusilla, and Stellaria parviflora. In Otago, S. laxa is associated with Poa imbecilla, Poa matthewsii, Chenopodium allanii, and an unnamed Cardamine sp.

== Threats ==
S. felix is classified as Threatened - Nationally Critical. There is very little data on population size, range, or trends.

It is highly local to the eight locations from which it is known, occupying only a few square metres at each site. It has specific light requirements, and is vulnerable to competition from other low-growing species. Grazing by cattle and sheep benefits it, but if maintained for long periods, will lead to the collapse of the forests it exists in.

== Taxonomy ==
Simplicia felix was first described in 2016 and has no synonyms.

S. felix is more closely related to S. laxa than S. buchananii.

=== Etymology ===
The etymology was not provided for the name Simplicia in the description for the type species S. laxa. However, in Latin, the word simplicia is the plural of simplex, meaning "plain, or simple; single".

The name felix is taken from the Latin for 'lucky', referring to the luck that lead to the species being described from a small tuft of grass found near Mangaweka.
