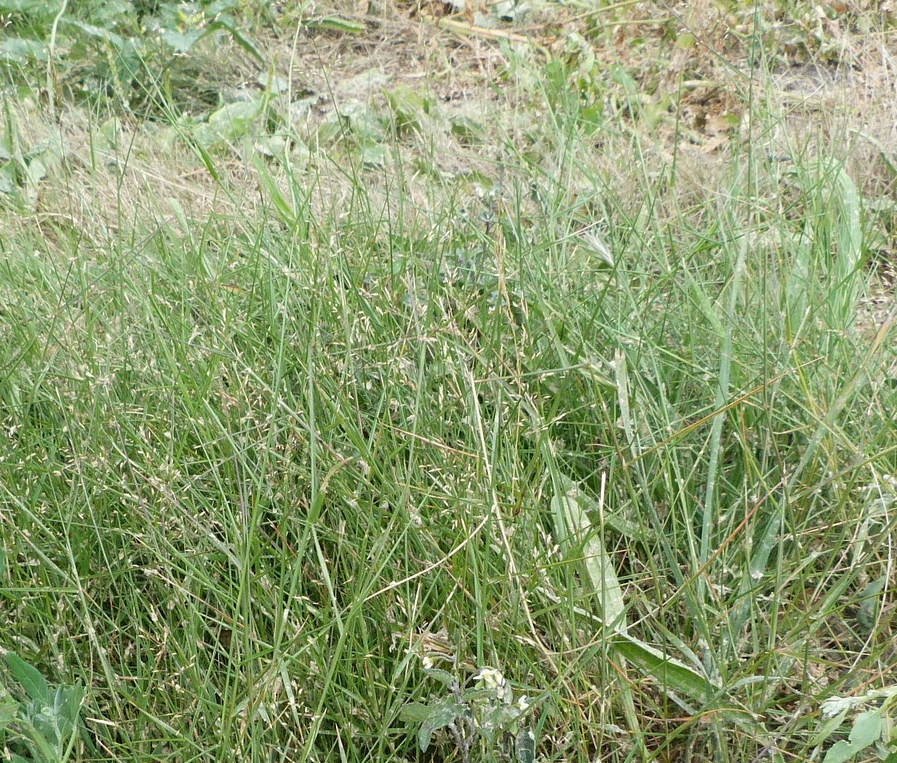

Scientific classification
- Kingdom: Plantae
- Clade: Tracheophytes
- Clade: Angiosperms
- Clade: Monocots
- Clade: Commelinids
- Order: Poales
- Family: Poaceae
- Subfamily: Pooideae
- Genus: Agrostis
- Species: A. castellana

Binomial name
- Agrostis castellana Boiss. & Reut.

Synonyms
- List: Agrostis azorica (Hochst. ex Seub.) Tutin & E.F.Warb.; Agrostis bolivaris Sennen; Agrostis byzantina Boiss.; Agrostis canariensis Parl.; Agrostis capillaris subsp. castellana (Boiss. & Reut.) O.Bolòs, Masalles & Vigo; Agrostis capillaris subsp. olivetorum (Godr. & Gren.) O.Bolòs, Masalles & Vigo; Agrostis capillaris var. olivetorum (Godr. & Gren.) Kerguélen; Agrostis castellana var. olivetorum (Godr. & Gren.) Kerguélen; Agrostis cavanillesiana Font Quer; Agrostis delicatula Pourr. ex Lapeyr.; Agrostis frondosa Ten. ex Spreng.; Agrostis gigantea subsp. moldavica (Dobrescu & Beldie) Dihoru; Agrostis hispanica Boiss. & Reut.; Agrostis lusitanica Steud.; Agrostis moldavica Dobrescu & Beldie; Agrostis olivetorum Godr. & Gren.; Agrostis pauciflora Costa; Agrostis schottii Trin.; Agrostis tricuspidata Hack.; Agrostis vinealis Honck.; Calamagrostis azorica (Hochst. ex Seub.) Steud.; Deyeuxia azorica Hochst. ex Seub.; Vilfa frondosa C.Presl

= Agrostis castellana =

Species of grass

Agrostis castellana, the highland bent, dryland bent or dryland browntop, is a species of cool-season grass in the family Poaceae. It is native to Macaronesia and the Mediterranean, has been widely introduced elsewhere, and is considered an invasive species in some locales. It is a hyperaccumulator of zinc and lead.
