= Rytidosperma telmaticum =

Scientific classification
- Kingdom: Plantae
- Clade: Tracheophytes
- Clade: Angiosperms
- Clade: Monocots
- Clade: Commelinids
- Order: Poales
- Family: Poaceae
- Genus: Rytidosperma
- Species: R. telmaticum

Binomial name
- Rytidosperma telmaticum Connor & Molloy

Species of plant

Rytidosperma telmaticum is a species of true grass in the subfamily Danthonioideae. It is endemic to New Zealand and was described as Rytidosperma telmaticum in 2005 by New Zealand botanist Brian Molloy and Henry Connor.

== Description ==
=== Identification ===
As a Rytidosperma, the easiest way to identify R. telmaticum is to select a single floret (which will contain a single awn, two lateral lobes, and usually three rows of hairs - one on the callus and two on the lemma). The arrangement of the hairs, as well as the relative lengths of the awn, lateral lobes, sometimes the callus can help identify to species, using a key such as that found in the New Zealand Flora.

== Taxonomy ==
=== Etymology ===
Rytidosperma: 'wrinkled seed' from the Greek 'rhytidos' = wrinkled and 'sperma' = seed
