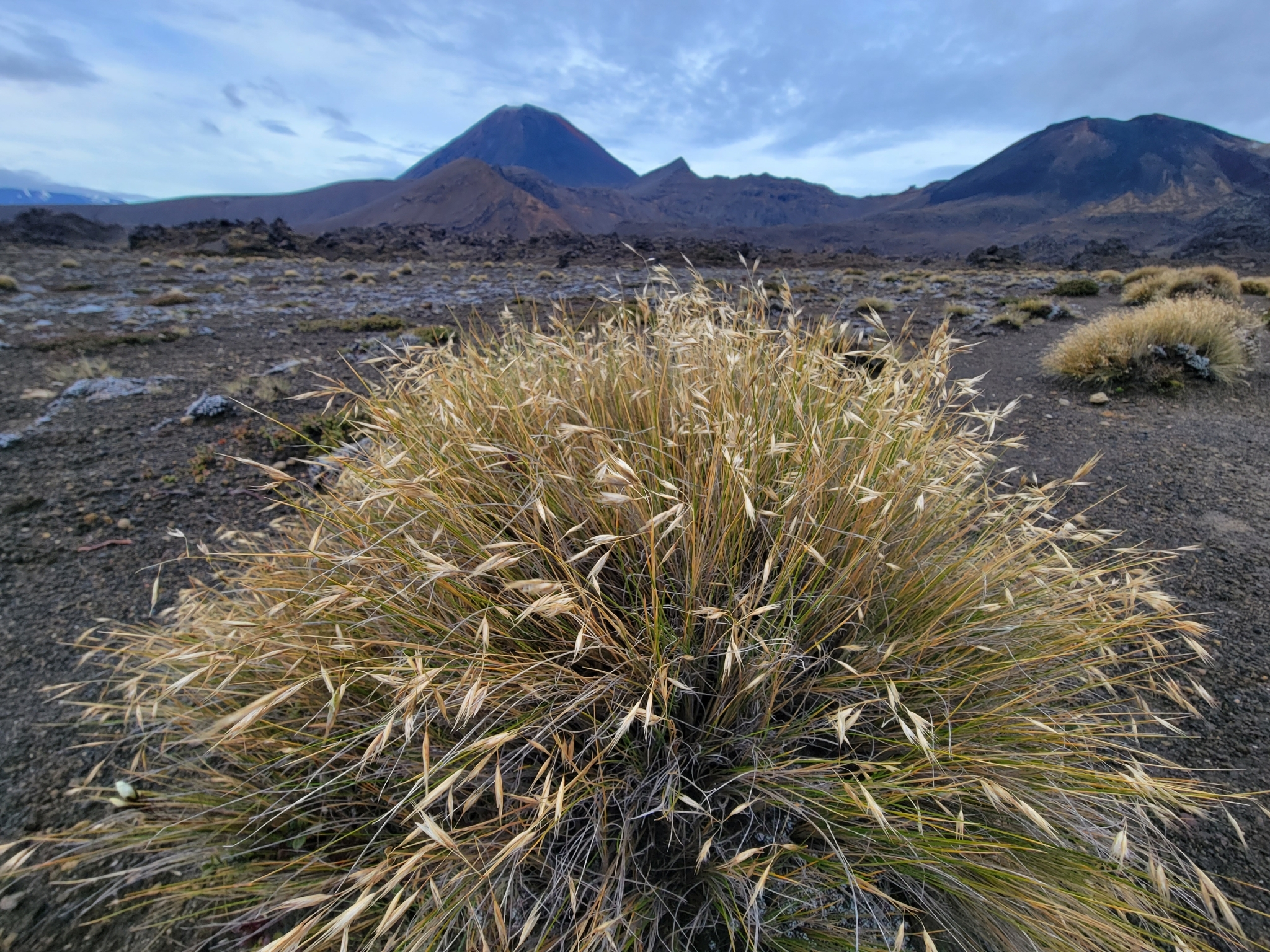
- Rytidosperma setifolium in Tongariro National Park

Conservation status
- Not Threatened (NZ TCS)

Scientific classification
- Kingdom: Plantae
- Clade: Tracheophytes
- Clade: Angiosperms
- Clade: Monocots
- Clade: Commelinids
- Order: Poales
- Family: Poaceae
- Genus: Rytidosperma
- Species: R. setifolium

Binomial name
- Rytidosperma setifolium (Hook.f.) Connor & Edgar

= Rytidosperma setifolium =

Species of flowering plant

Rytidosperma setifolium, the bristle tussock or mountain danthonia, is a species of grass, endemic to New Zealand. It is known largely from alpine areas.

== Description ==
Rytidosperma setifolium is a perennial plant. It grows in low tussocks. The glumes are purple, from red to black.

== Distribution and habitat ==
Rytidosperma setifolium is known from the North, South, and Stewart Island in New Zealand. It grows in mountainous areas, particularly in rocky areas in the northern part of its range.

== Ecology ==
The rust fungus Uromyces danthoniae, a species found that grows parasitically on the leaves of several Rytidosperma species in New Zealand and Australia, infects Rytidosperma setifolium. It forms dense clusters of orange-brown aecidia on both surfaces of the leaf.

== Etymology ==
Setifolium means 'bristle-leaved' in Latin.
