= Festuca contracta =

Scientific classification
- Kingdom: Plantae
- Clade: Tracheophytes
- Clade: Angiosperms
- Clade: Monocots
- Clade: Commelinids
- Order: Poales
- Family: Poaceae
- Subfamily: Pooideae
- Genus: Festuca
- Species: F. contracta

Binomial name
- Festuca contracta Kirk

Species of grass

Festuca contracta, commonly known as tufted fescue or land tussac, is a species of true grass (Poaceae). It is native to many subantarctic islands in, and the coasts bordering, the Southern Ocean. The specific epithet comes from the Latin contractus (compressed or contracted), with reference to the inflorescence.

== Description ==
Festuca contracta is an erect, stiff-tufted, dense, blue-green grass that grows to 80–400 mm in height. It has ridged culms and a contracted panicle 30–120 mm in length. The spikelets are about 12 mm long, including the awns. The glumes have a strong mid-nerve, and are scabrous near the tip. The anthers are about 0.5 mm long. It flowers from October to January.

== Distribution and habitat ==
The plant is native to Macquarie Island, South Georgia, the Kerguelen and Falkland Islands, as well as to Tierra del Fuego and Patagonia. On Macquarie it is common in peaty areas, from the coast to at least 350 m above sea level.
