= Rytidosperma corinum =

Scientific classification
- Kingdom: Plantae
- Clade: Tracheophytes
- Clade: Angiosperms
- Clade: Monocots
- Clade: Commelinids
- Order: Poales
- Family: Poaceae
- Genus: Rytidosperma
- Species: R. corinum

Binomial name
- Rytidosperma corinum Connor & Edgar

Species of plant

Rytidosperma corinum is a species of true grass in the subfamily Danthonioideae. It is endemic to New Zealand and was described in 1979 by New Zealand botanists Henry Connor and Elizabeth Edgar.

== Description ==
=== Identification ===
As a Rytidosperma, the easiest way to identify R. corinum is to select a single floret (which will contain a single awn, two lateral lobes, and usually three rows of hairs - one on the callus and two on the lemma). The arrangement of the hairs, as well as the relative lengths of the awn, lateral lobes, sometimes the callus can help identify to species, using a key such as that found in the New Zealand Flora.

== Taxonomy ==
=== Etymology ===
Rytidosperma: 'wrinkled seed' from the Greek 'rhytidos' = wrinkled and 'sperma' = seed
