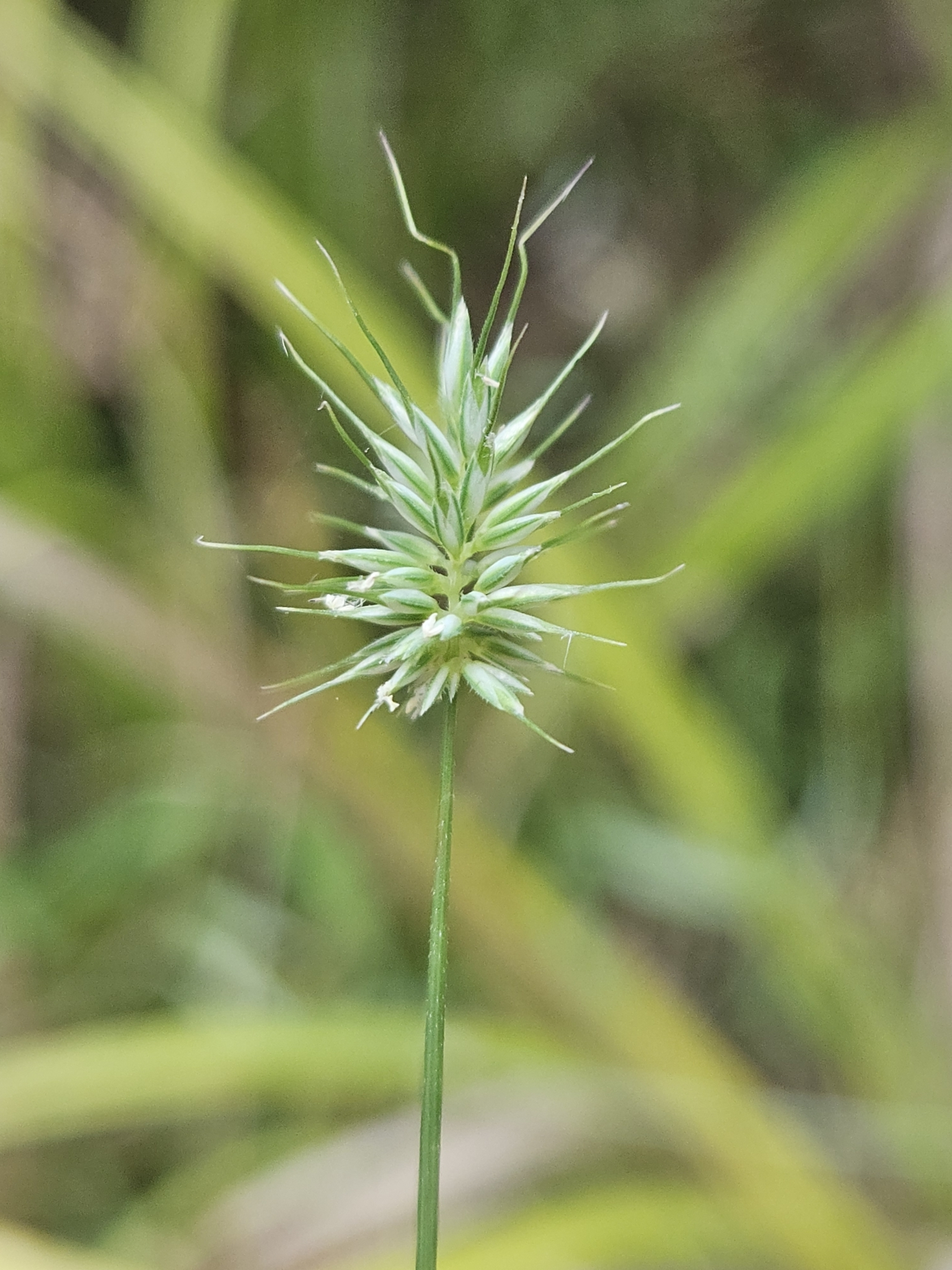
- A stalk of Echinopogon ovatus

Conservation status
- Declining (NZ TCS)

Scientific classification
- Kingdom: Plantae
- Clade: Tracheophytes
- Clade: Angiosperms
- Clade: Monocots
- Clade: Commelinids
- Order: Poales
- Family: Poaceae
- Subfamily: Pooideae
- Genus: Echinopogon
- Species: E. ovatus

Binomial name
- Echinopogon ovatus (G.Forst.) P.Beauv.

= Echinopogon ovatus =

Species of grass

Echinopogon ovatus, or hedgehog grass, is a species of grass. It is indigenous to Australia and New Zealand. It has bluish-green tufts which grow up to around 140 cm (55 in).

== Description ==
Echinopogon ovatus is a lax, tufted grass up to 140 cm (55 in) tall. The culm is upright-decumbent, baring an ovate panicle made up of 20–30 green spikelets with finely scabrid awns.

Echinopogon ovatus could be confused with Cynosurus echinatus, from which it can be distinguished by the lack of clustered spikelets.

== Distribution ==
Echinopogon ovatus is indigenous to both Australia and New Zealand.

In New Zealand it is found throughout both main islands, although is rarer in the western parts of the South Island. It is also found on the Three Kings Islands and Chatham Islands.

== Habitat ==
Echinopogon ovatus is found from sea level to montane. It is found in forest or scrub, as well as on dry banks and waste places.

== Threats ==
Echinopogon ovatus is classified as At Risk - Declining, partly due to the spread of invasive grasses Cortaderia jubata, C. selloana, and Sporobolus africanus.
