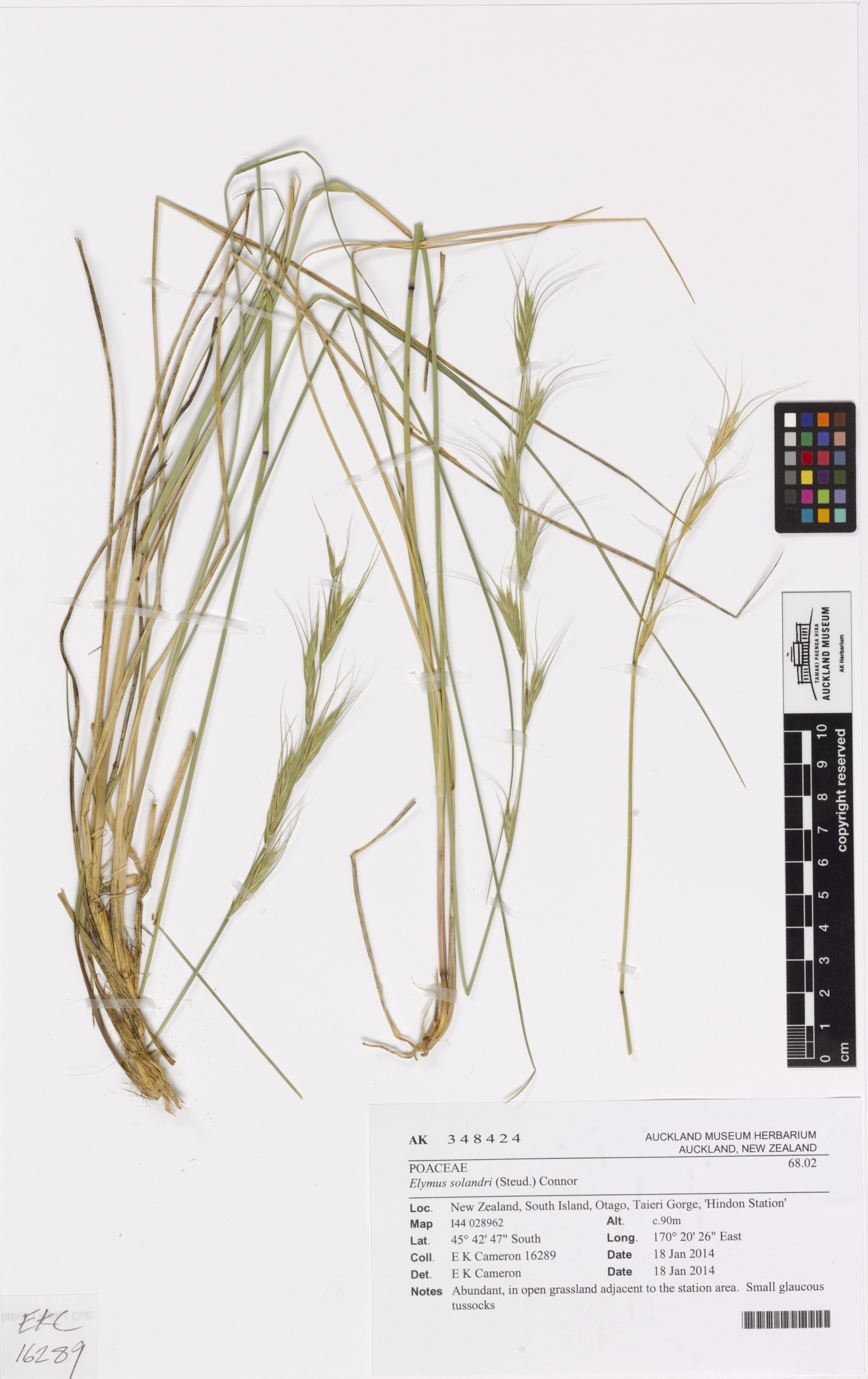

Conservation status
- Not Threatened (NZ TCS)

Scientific classification
- Kingdom: Plantae
- Clade: Tracheophytes
- Clade: Angiosperms
- Clade: Monocots
- Clade: Commelinids
- Order: Poales
- Family: Poaceae
- Subfamily: Pooideae
- Genus: Anthosachne
- Species: A. solandri

Binomial name
- Anthosachne solandri (Connor) Barkworth & S.W.L.Jacobs

Synonyms
- Elymus solandri Connor (1994); Triticum solandri Steud. (1854); Triticum squarrosum Banks & Sol. ex Hook.f. (1844)

= Anthosachne solandri =

Endemic grass of New Zealand

Anthosachne solandri, blue wheat grass, or pātītī taranui is a species of true grass in the tribe Triticeae endemic to New Zealand. It is a medium stature tufted grass that tends to have flat, blueish leaves. It flowers from September–February, and fruits from October–May.

== Distribution and habitat ==
A. solandri is endemic to the North and South Islands of Aotearoa New Zealand. It is found in open habitats in coastal environments and inland tussock grasslands, as well as in riverbeds, screes, and moraines from elevations 0-1500 m.

It has never been found north of Motu Kaikoura, an island off Great Barrier Island. It had originally been collected there by Thomas Kirk in 1867 (AK 11174), but was presumed extinct there until 2006, when it was refound by Ewen Cameron.

The type for the species was collected by Joseph Banks and Daniel Solander during Caption James Cook's first voyage to New Zealand onboard the HMS Endeavour. The type location was "on rocks near Tōtaranui", a location in present day Marlborough Sounds.

== Description ==
Anthosachne solandri is a medium stature tufted grass, usually brightly glaucous, sometimes green. Inflorescences have 3-15 spikelets that lie closely against the rachis, which contain 4-10 florets with long awns.

A. solandri and its most similar relative, A. scabra, can be distinguished from other long-awned Anthosachne in Aotearoa New Zealand by their flat leaves and long, clasping auricles.

A. solandri has long been confused with the exotic A. scabra. From that species, A. solandri is separated by its more glaucous (blueish) leaves, by its recurved awns, and pointed, bifid, palea apexes.

== Ecology ==
As a species of open habitats, the recovery following the removal of grazing has resulted in declines of this species in tussock grassland in Marlborough (declining from 12.5% frequency to 4.1%). In the Canterbury and Otago Regions, A. solandri increased in response to rabbit control between 1990 and 1995.

At Flat Top Hill, Central Otago, A. solandri is found within plant communities dominated by the invasive species Thymus vulgaris, Rosa rubiginosa, and Sedum acre, growing even within dense canopies Thymus vulgaris. It is also associated there with grasses Agrostis capillaris, Anthoxanthum odoratum, Arrhenatherum elatius, Dactylis glomerata, Festuca novae-zelandiae, Festuca rubra, Holcus lanatus, Poa maniototo, Rytidosperma buchananii, R. clavatum, R. thomsonii, R. unarede, and Poa annua, with the herbs Acaena novae-zelandiae, Lysimachia arvensis, Crepis capillaris, Helichrysum filicaule, Hypericum perforatum, Hypochaeris radicata, Chaerophyllum ramosum, Pseudognaphalium luteoalbum, Trifolium repens, T. arvense, Verbascum thapsus, and Vittadinia australis, Wahlenbergia albomarginata, the orchids Microtis unifolia and Thelymitra longifolia, the ferns Asplenium flabellifolium and Austroblechnum penna-marina, the liane Muehlenbeckia complexa, and the sedges Carex subtilis, Carex breviculmis.

== Taxonomy ==
What is now known as Anthosachne solandri was originally described in 1844 in the genus Triticum, as T. squarrosum, by Joseph Dalton Hooker. Hooker used specimens collected by Joseph Banks and Daniel Solander during Caption James Cook's first voyage to New Zealand onboard the HMS Endeavour. On the collection sheet was the location "in rupibus prope Totaranui", Latin for on rocks near Tōtaranui, a location in present day Marlborough Sounds, where they visited on 22 January 1770.

T. squarrosum was renamed T. solandri in 1854, presumably because a taxon named T. squarrosum already existed. In 1864, Joseph Dalton Hooker described a second taxon from the source of the river Waitaki, as Triticum youngii, separating it from then T. solandri on the basis that it was particularly tall, and had longer awns. This taxon was renamed Agropyron youngii in 1901. In 1994, Connor moved T. solandri into Elymus as Elymus solandri, and recognised A. youngii as a synonym of it. In 2011, genetic analysis showed that the Australasian Elymus were distinct from Elymus elsewhere, and were moved into the resurrected genus Anthosachne, hence the present name Anthosachne solandri.

Anthosachne solandri has been described as a variable species. On islands in the Cook Strait and Marlborough Sounds, plants are described as having longer shoots, broader leaves, and more toothed lemmas than on the mainland, as well as more compact inflorescences and asymmetrical florets. Similar plants exist at Paritutu on the Taranaki coast. In Wellington, plants are very glaucous and prostrate. Plants in inland Otago and Marlborough have inrolled, channelled leaves, but the variation is not stable in cultivation. On alpine screes also exist a short-culmed, few-flowered form.

=== Etymology ===
The name 'Anthosachne' comes from the Greek 'anthos', meaning flower, and 'achne' , meaning scale, probably referring to the sterile upper florets of the spikelets.

The name solandri is named after the Swedish botanist Daniel Solander (1733-1782), who collected the type specimen of the species.

=== Hybrids ===
Experimental hybrids exist between A. solandri and A. aprica, A. kingiana, A. rectisetus, as well as Corronochloa tenuis, and Stenostachys enysii.

Several wild hybrids are known, the most common of which is between Anthosachne solandri and Anthosachne kingiana. While many collections are labelled as such, most are in fact long-awned A. kingiana. True hybrids tend to have awns equal or greater than the lemma length.

Wild, sterile hybrids are also known between A. solandri and all members of Stenostachys. Several hybrids between A. solandri and Stenostachys enysii have been collected, and are named Elymus ×wallii. Hybrids are also known between A. solandri and Stenostachys gracilis, S. laevis, and S. deceptorix.

== Threats ==
In the Wellington Region, this species is recognised as Regionally Endangered. The recent spread of the weedy herb Aichryson laxum may further threaten A. solandri, given that it is largely found in open coastal habitats that A. laxum is invading.

The species was previously thought extinct in Auckland, having been collected on Motu Kaikoura off Great Barrier Island in 1867. It was rediscovered at the same location in 2006 by Ewen Cameron.

== Gallery ==
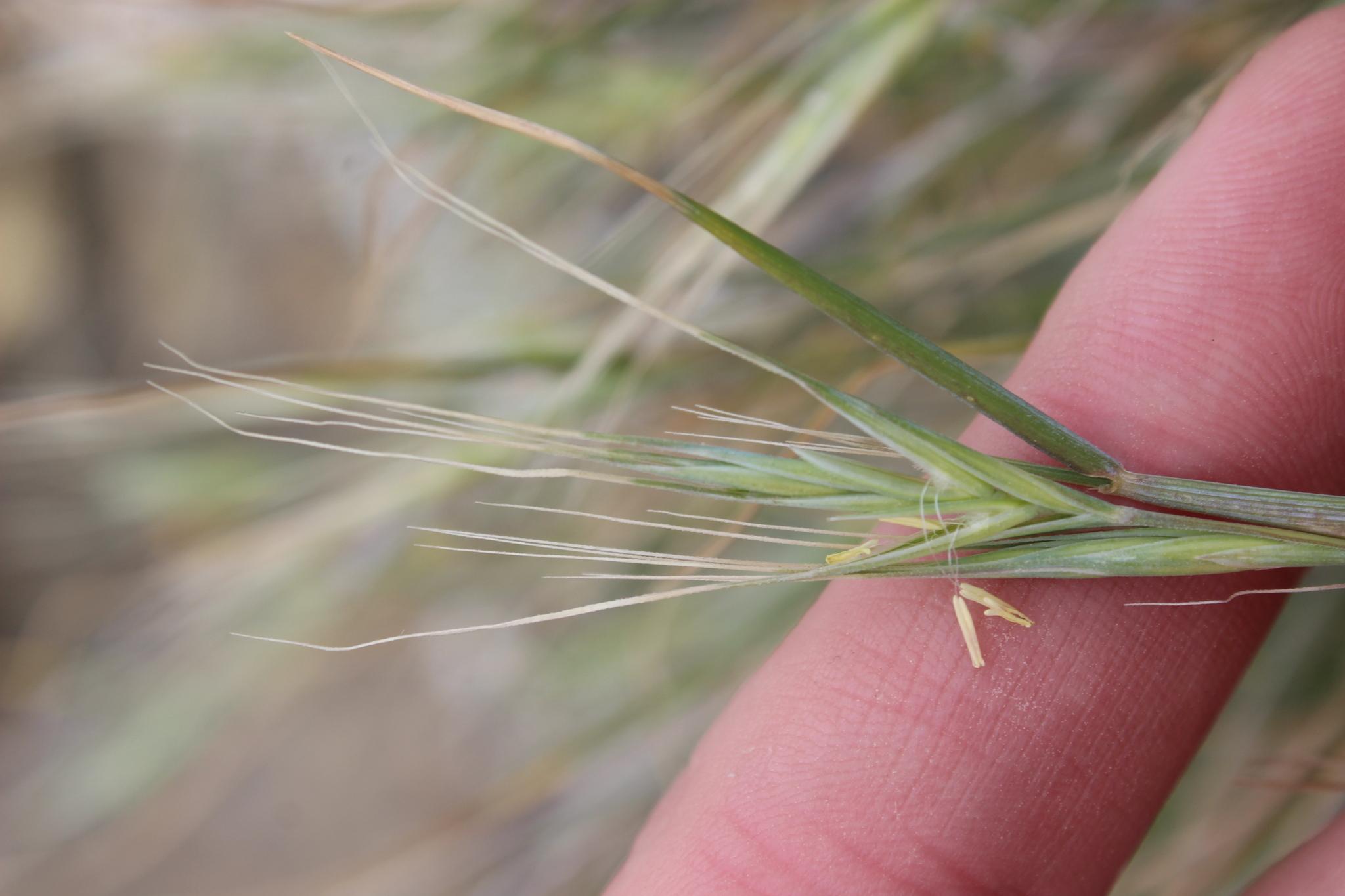
Flowering Anthosachne solandri spikelet

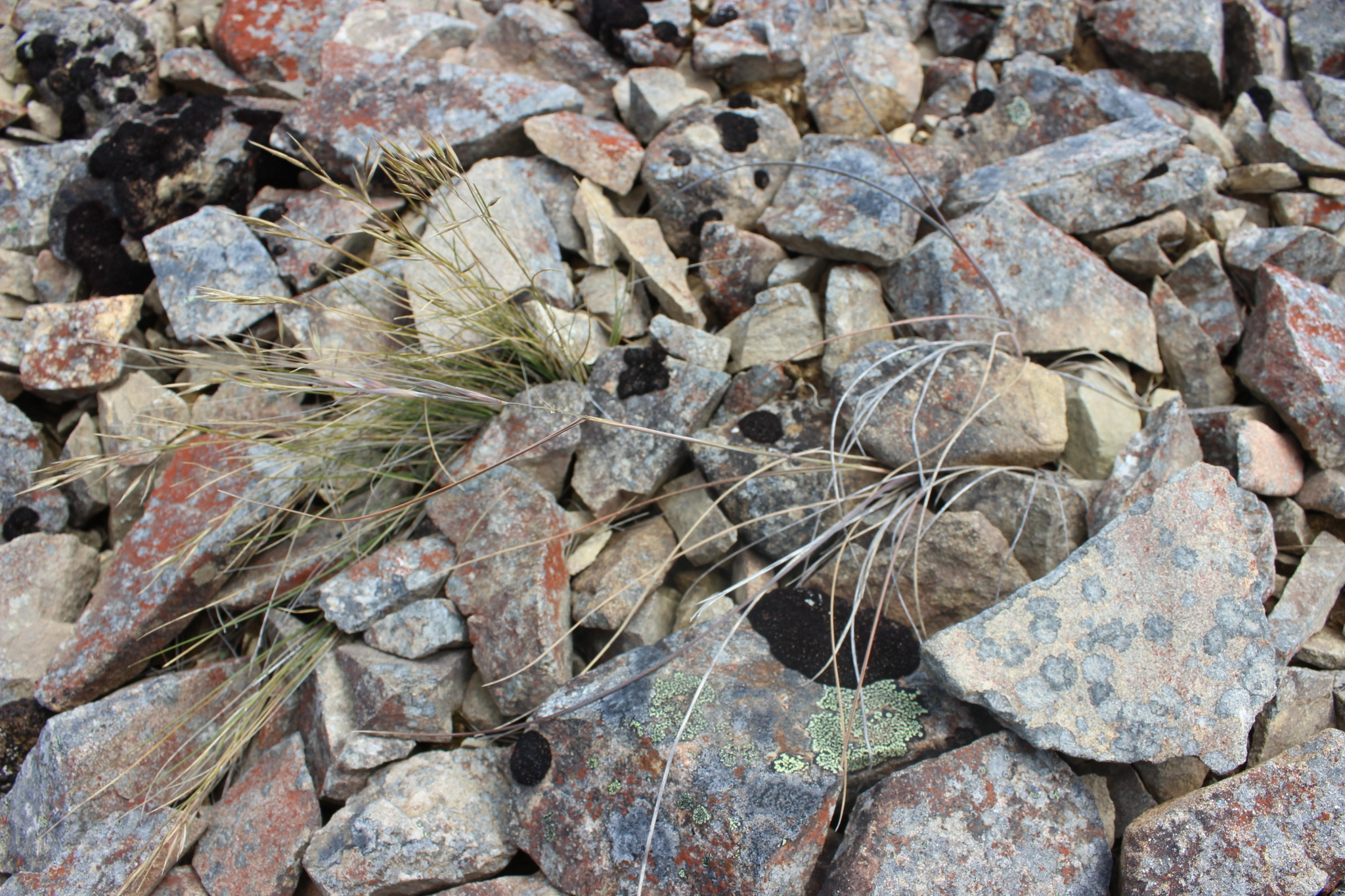
Alpine scree form with rolled leaves and few flowers

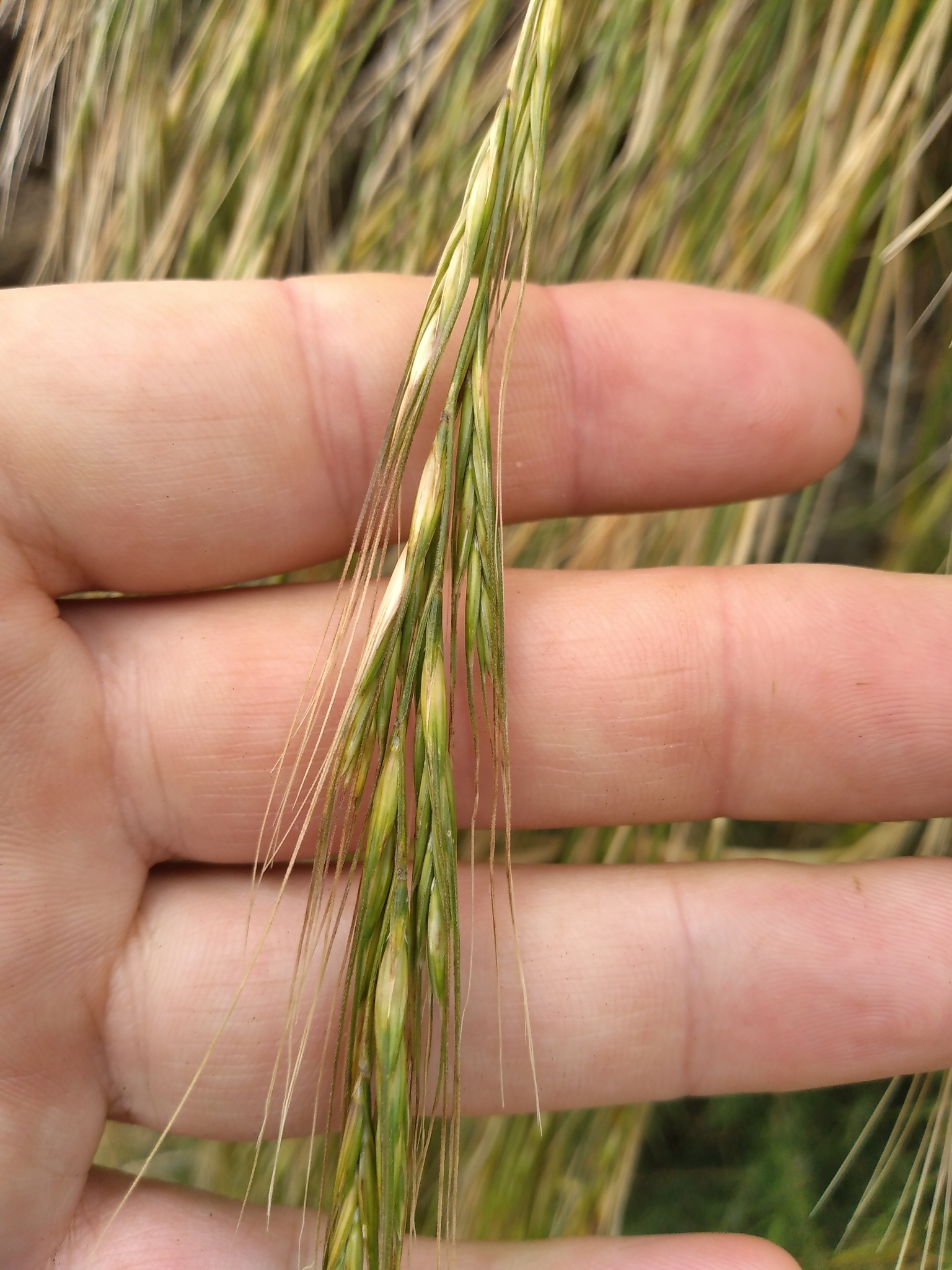
Inflorescence

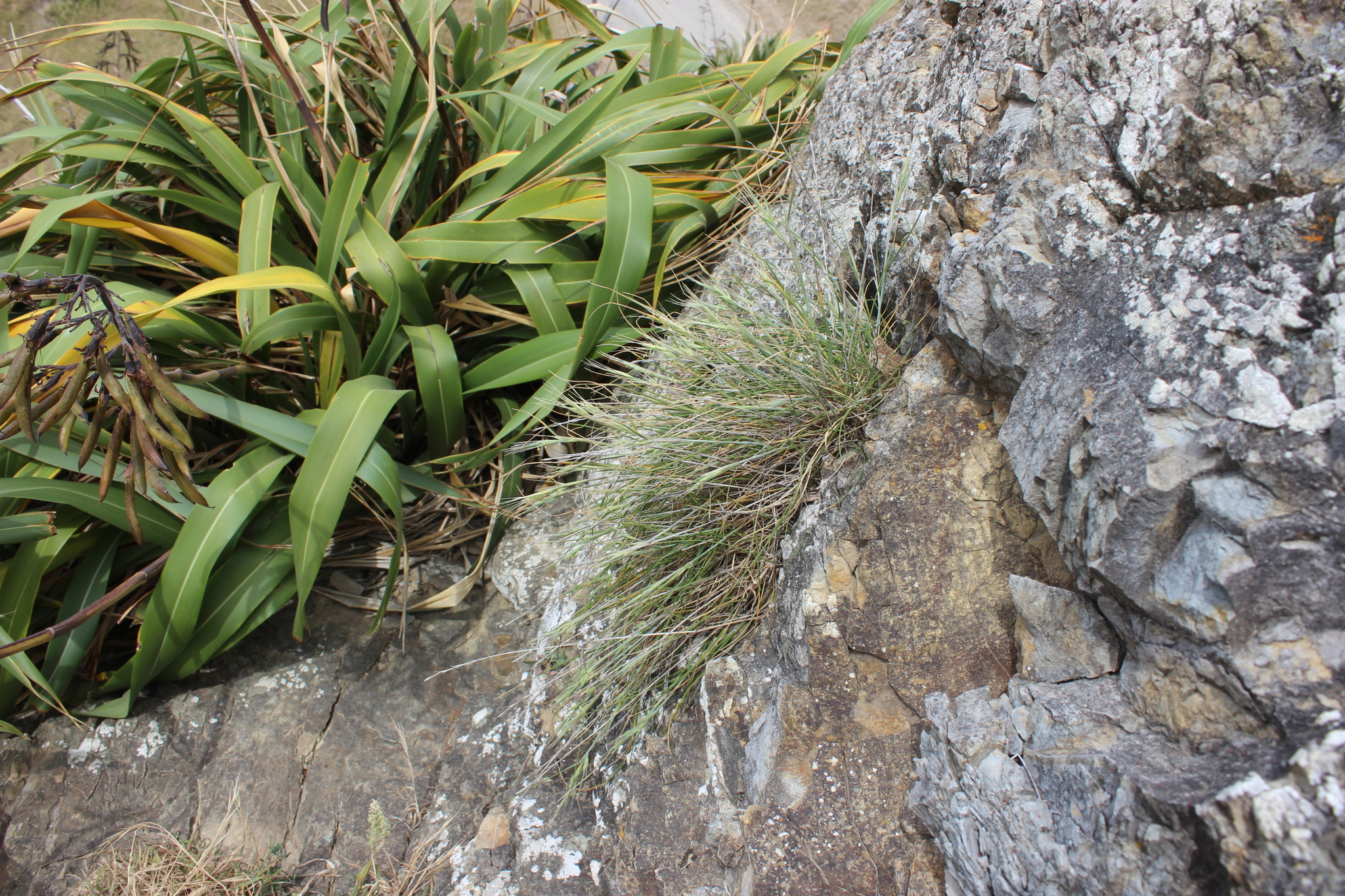
A. solandri in habitat
