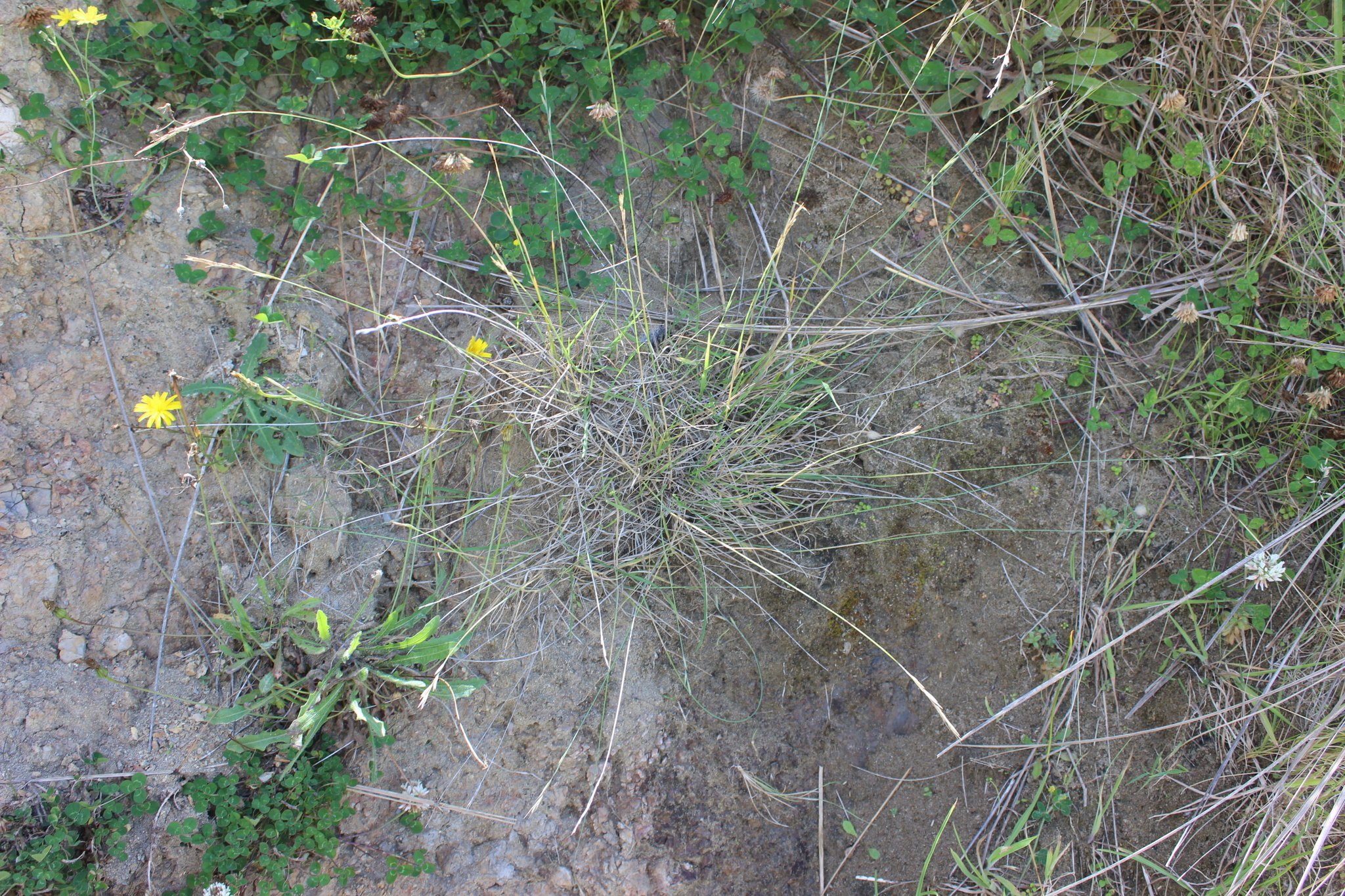

Conservation status
- Declining (NZ TCS)

Scientific classification
- Kingdom: Plantae
- Clade: Embryophytes
- Clade: Tracheophytes
- Clade: Spermatophytes
- Clade: Angiosperms
- Clade: Monocots
- Clade: Commelinids
- Order: Poales
- Family: Poaceae
- Subfamily: Pooideae
- Genus: Anthosachne
- Species: A. kingiana

Binomial name
- Anthosachne kingiana (Endl.) Govaerts

= Anthosachne kingiana =

Species of grass

Anthosachne kingiana, tūtae kurī (Māori), short-awned wheat grass (New Zealand), blue grass (Australian), or Phillip Island wheat grass (Australian), is a flowering plant in the family Poaceae (the grass family), from the tribe Triticeae. There are two identified subspecies:

- A. kingiana subsp. kingiana - a subspecies indigenous to Phillip Island, Norfolk Island and Lord Howe Island.
- A. kingiana subsp. multiflora - a subspecies indigenous to Aotearoa/New Zealand and Eastern Australia.

== Description ==
A short, tufted, perennial, glaucous to green grass. Inflorescences have 6-15 spikelets that lie closely against the rachis, which contain 7-12 florets with short awns.

Easily distinguished from other Anthosachne in Aotearoa/New Zealand by its awns which are usually short and straight. Individuals with unusually long awns could be confused with A. solandri, but can be distinguished by the thin, rolled leaves, and the straight awns.

In Australia, A. kingiana and its close relative A. fertilis could be confused with the straight-awned A. rectiseta, A. longiseta, however, both of those species have awns greater than 17mm. A. kingiana can be distinguished from A. fertilis by its shorter awns, which are 0-80% of the length of the lemma, versus 70-130% of the length of the lemma in A. fertilis. Anthosachne fertilis, while recognised as a distinct by the Australian Plant Census, is recognised by Plants of the World Online and The World Checklist of Vascular Plants as a synonym of Anthosachne kingiana subsp. multiflora.

Connor distinguished A. kingiana subsp. kingiana from the Australian and Aotearoa/New Zealand A. kingiana subsp. multiflora on the basis that it has many prickle-teeth on the lemmas and glumes of its spikelets, and tends to have longer awns. Barkworth added to this, specifying that the longest awns of A. kingiana subsp. kingiana are longer than the lemma bodies, whereas in A. kingiana subsp. multiflora, the awns are shorter than or equal to the length of the lemma bodies.

== Distribution and habitat ==
A. kingiana subsp. multiflora is indigenous to Aotearoa/New Zealand and Eastern Australia. In Aotearoa/New Zealand it is largely found in coastal areas of the North Island and Eastern South Island. It is largely found in open habitats, such as cliffs and rocks, frequently on limestone. It is sparse south of the Hauraki Gulf, and occasionally occurs inland.

=== Anthosachne kingiana subsp. kingiana ===
A. kingiana subsp. kingiana was previously considered an extinct subspecies endemic to Phillip Island, an island off Norfolk Island, but has since been rediscovered on Phillip Island, and found in Norfolk Island and Lord Howe Island.

On Lord Howe Island, Anthosachne kingiana subsp. kingiana occurs in open habitats where coastal basalt-derived rocky cliffs intergrade into a shrub zone that emerges from littoral rainforest. It is associated with several grasses and herbs such as Dichelachne crinita, Poa poiformis, Senecio howeanus, Sporobolus virginicus, Tetragonia tetragonioides and shrub species, such as Cassinia tenuifolia, Dodonaea viscosa, Leucopogon parviflorus, Melaleuca howeana and Wollastonia biflora.

== Threats ==
Anthosachne kingiana subsp. multiflora is listed as At Risk - Naturally Uncommon in Aotearoa/New Zealand by the New Zealand Threat Classification System. North Island populations have reportedly declined in recent decades, with competition with spreading coastal weeds, such as Cortaderia jubata, C. selloana, and Sporobolus africanus, being implicated.

=== Anthosachne kingiana subsp. kingiana ===
On Phillip Island, Australia, Anthosachne kingiana subsp. kingiana had been considered extinct, along with other plants endemic to the island, due to herbivory by introduced feral goats, pigs, and rabbits. Following the eradication of rabbits and the dying-out of goats and pigs, the grass was rediscovered in 1987, having recolonised the area. It was one of two plant taxa previously thought extinct to be rediscovered on Phillip Island, the other being Abutilon julianae. In 1963, a specimen was also collected on Norfolk Island itself.

Anthosachne kingiana subsp. kingiana is considered critically endangered on Lord Howe Island by the New South Wales government, under the Environment Protection and Biodiversity Conservation Act 1999. Anthosachne populations on the island had been previously mistakenly called Agyrpogon scabrum, an older name for Anthosachne scabra, but were recognised as Anthosachne kingiana subsp. kingiana by 1994. Recent surveys on the Island have located up to 30 individuals, with the estimated population size being less than 50 plants. The population is threatened by environmental and demographic stochasticity due to their restricted distributions and population sizes, and is further threatened through competition with introduced invasive plants such as Briza minor, Bromus diandrus, Bromus cartharticus, Erigeron bonariensis, Ipomoea cairica, Paspalum dilatatum, Sonchus oleraceus, and Sporobolus africanus.

== Taxonomy ==
What is now considered Anthosachne kingiana originally comprised two species in the wheat genus Triticum: T. kingianum (described from Phillip Island specimens in 1833); and T. multiflorum (described from Aotearoa/New Zealand specimens from Mercury Bay in 1853). In 1854, T. kingiana was moved into Festuca, then in 1915, both taxa were moved into Agropyron before being moved again into Elymus in 1982.

In 1990, Henry Connor recognised that the Phillip Island taxon, then called Elymus kingiana, was similar to the then Elymus multiflorus, and was moved to the varietal rank of Elymus multiflorus var. kingianus. In 1994, Connor clarified that while the two taxa were the same species, E. multiflorus var. kingianus was distinct from the Australian and Aotearoa/New Zealand plants on the basis that it has many prickle-teeth on the lemmas and glumes of its spikelets, and tends to have longer awns. In 2005, de Lange et al. determined that a subspecies rank was more appropriate for the Phillip Island taxon, and elevated it to Elymus multiflorus subsp. kingianus.

In 2011, genetic analysis showed that the Australasian Elymus were distinct from Elymus elsewhere, and were moved into the resurrected genus Anthosachne. The two taxa were named Anthosachne multiflora subsp. kingiana and Anthosachne multiflora subsp. multiflora. Finally, in 2014, a mistake was noticed by Govaerts, which had been made by Connor in 1990 while reducing the Phillip Island taxon to the varietal rank. Connor had mistakenly identified the basionym Tricitum kingianum as having been described in 1883 rather than 1833, leading to Triticum multiflorum being incorrectly prioritised as the oldest name. Thus, Govaerts created the new combinations Anthosachne kingiana subsp. multiflorum for the Aotearoa/New Zealand and Australian taxon, and Anthosachne kingiana subsp. kingiana for the Phillip Island taxon.

Anthosachne fertilis, while recognised as distinct by the Australian Plant Census, is recognised by Plants of the World Online and The World Checklist of Vascular Plants as a synonym of Anthosachne kingiana subsp. multiflora.

== Gallery ==
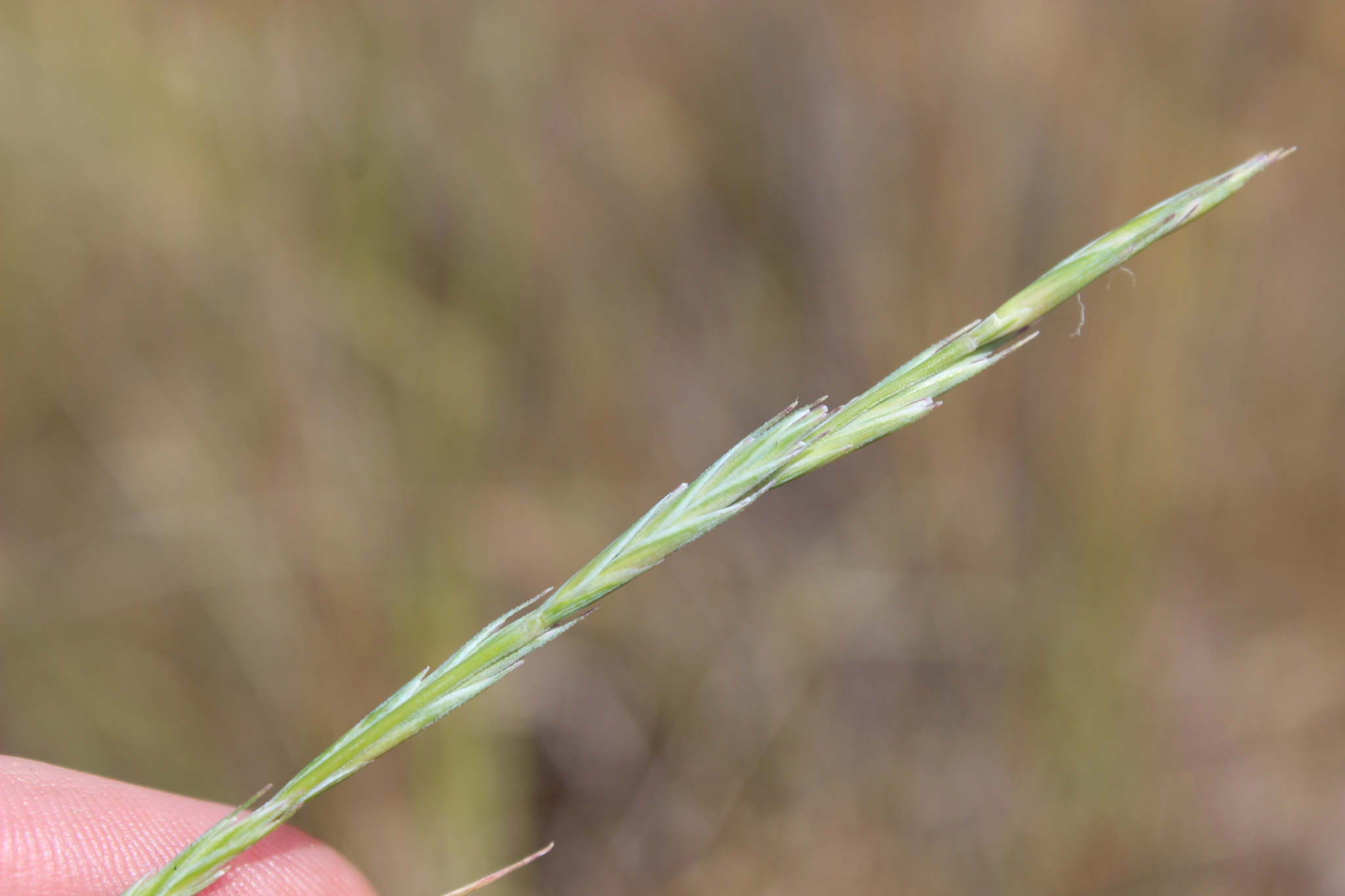
Glaucous, short-awned inflorescence
