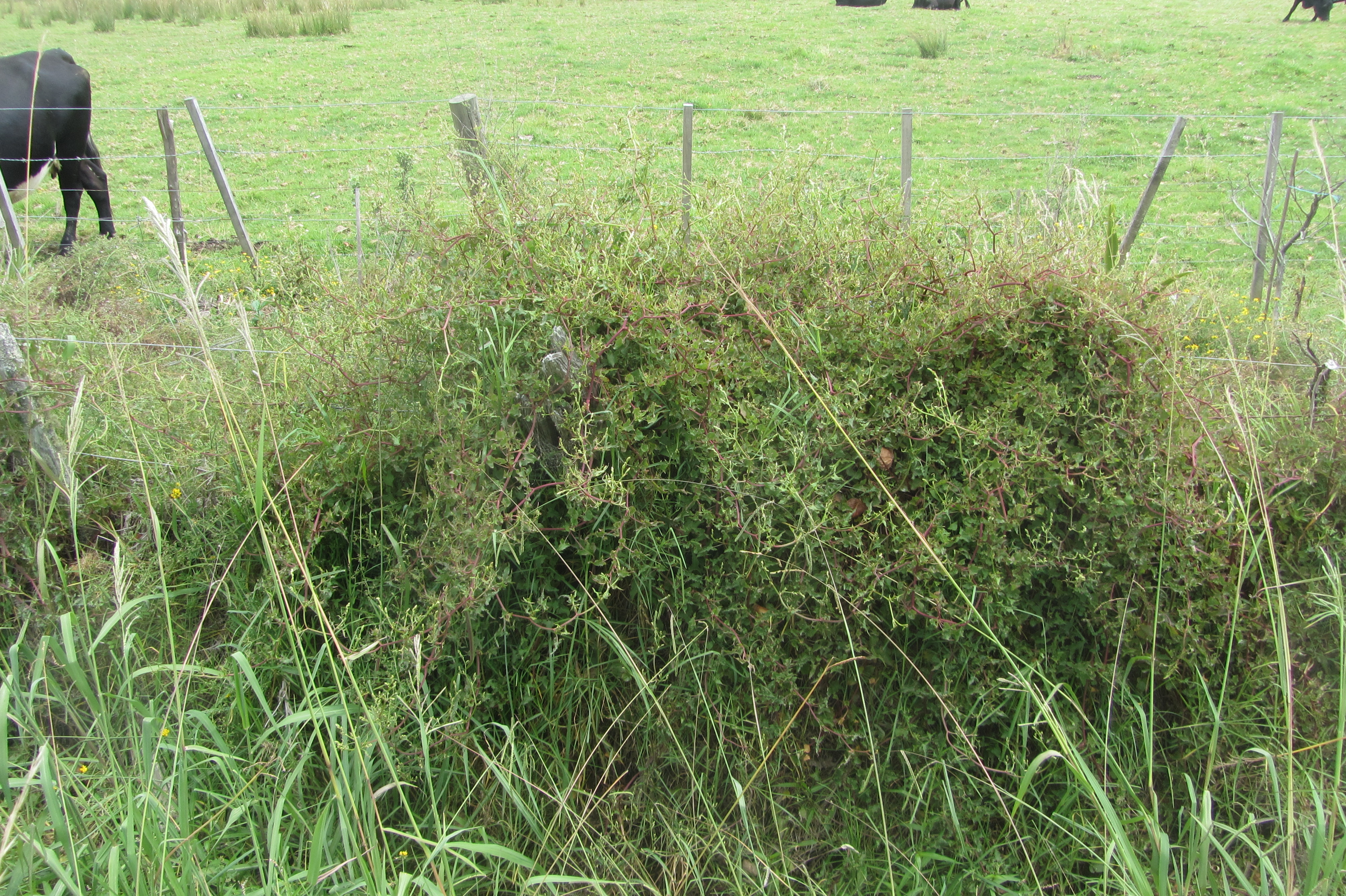

Conservation status
- Naturally Uncommon (NZ TCS)

Scientific classification
- Kingdom: Plantae
- Clade: Tracheophytes
- Clade: Angiosperms
- Clade: Monocots
- Clade: Commelinids
- Order: Poales
- Family: Poaceae
- Subfamily: Pooideae
- Genus: Anthosachne
- Species: A. sacandros

Binomial name
- Anthosachne sacandros (Connor) Barkworth & S.W.L.Jacobs

Synonyms
- Elymus sacandros Connor

= Anthosachne sacandros =

Species of grass

Anthosachne sacandros is a species of true grass in the tribe Triticeae. It is endemic to open habitats in the Marlborough Region of New Zealand. It grows on limestone cliffs, bluffs and river terraces, from elevations of 0–900 m. It flowers from October–February, and fruits from December–May.

== Description ==
It is a medium-size, tufted, perennial grass. It is a long-awned Anthosachne, with spikelets appressed to the rachis, and with involute leaf-blades. It is most similar to A. falcis, from which it can be distinguished by its erect growth form, and long, thin, ribbed and glaucous leaf blades, with a dense weft of hairs at the leaf blade–ligule junction.

== Distribution and habitat ==
A. sacandros is endemic to Marlborough from sea level to 900m above sea level, with most populations on coasts. It is a calcicole, found on limestone cliffs and river terraces in open habitat.

The type location is Isolation Creek, northwest of Ben More, Marlborough, collected in 1975.

== Threats ==
Anthosachne sacandros is listed as At Risk - Naturally Uncommon by the New Zealand Threat Classification System. Its threats are poorly known, and there is little information about population size or trends.

Flora in the Marlborough District is threatened by introduced species such as the common brushtail possum, and plants such as Lycium ferocissimum and Pinus contorta. Fire, floods and erosion are common in the Marlborough District, and can potentially impact range restricted species like A. sacandros.

== Taxonomy ==
Before 1994, what is now considered A. sacandros was considered part of the widespread species now called Anthosachne scabra. Then, along with A. sacandros, both species were described for the first time in the genus Elymus, as E. aprica and E. sacandros. In 2011, genetic analysis showed that the Australasian Elymus were distinct from Elymus elsewhere, and were moved into the resurrected genus Anthosachne, hence the present name Anthosachne sacandros.

=== Etymology ===
The name 'Anthosachne' comes from the Greek 'anthos', meaning flower, and 'achne' , meaning scale, probably referring to the sterile upper florets of the spikelets.

The name 'sacandros' refers to the weft of hairs on the leaf-blade just above the ligule. Presumably, this comes from 'sakos' meaning shield, and 'andros', meaning man, similar to the genus Androsace.

== Biology ==
A. sacandros flowers from October-February, and fruits from December-May. Seeds and pollen are dispersed by wind. It is chasmogamous, meaning it is an out-crossing species.
