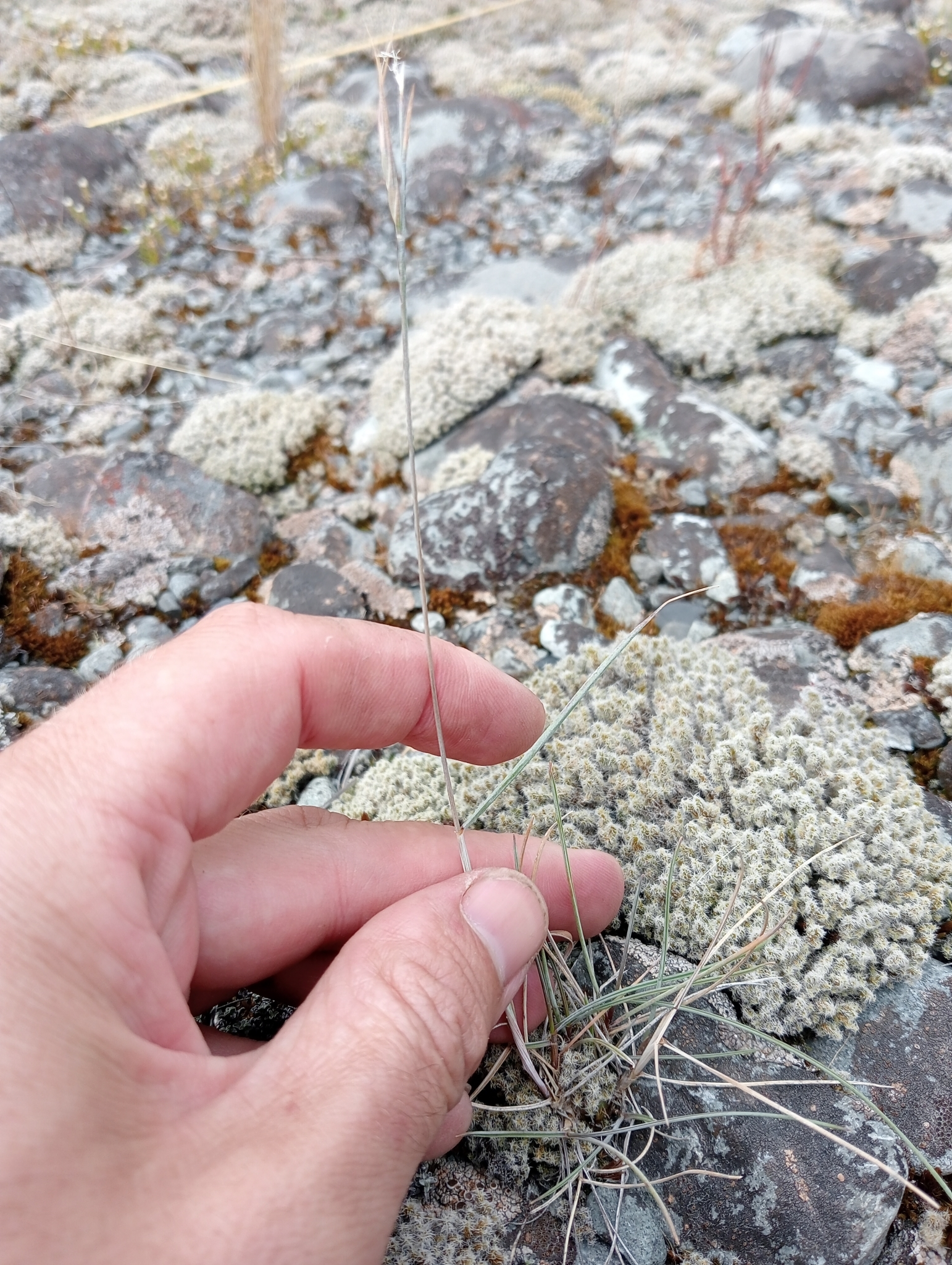

Conservation status
- Declining (NZ TCS)

Scientific classification
- Kingdom: Plantae
- Clade: Tracheophytes
- Clade: Angiosperms
- Clade: Monocots
- Clade: Commelinids
- Order: Poales
- Family: Poaceae
- Subfamily: Pooideae
- Genus: Anthosachne
- Species: A. falcis

Binomial name
- Anthosachne falcis (Connor) Barkworth & S.W.L.Jacobs

Synonyms
- Elymus falcis Connor

= Anthosachne falcis =

Species of plant

Anthosachne falcis, the dryland blue grass, is a species of true grass of the tribe Triticeae. This species is endemic to New Zealand.

== Description ==
Anthosachne falcis is a small, tufted, blueish grass. Its leaves are thin (0.5-0.7 mm), 50-150 mm long, and are involute (with leaf margins rolled in towards the upper side). Its inflorescences are 20-100mm tall, borne on 100-150 mm culms. Within the inflorescences are 1-4 spikelets, 40-50 mm long, with 4-6 florets each.

Anthosachne falcis is most similar to A. sacandros, from which is can be distinguished by the glaucous rather than hirsute leaves, recurved rather than straight awns, and bifid, pointed palea apexes rather than blunt, truncate palea apexes.

== Distribution ==
Anthosachne falcis is endemic to the South Island of New Zealand, found only within the inland Waimakariri, Ashburton, Waitaki, and Taieri River basins.

The type location is Mt Edwards, Canterbury.

== Habitat ==
Anthosachne falcis is found within short tussock (Festuca novae-zealandiae) grassland on dry open ground, river beds, rocky sites, and clay pans, from 450-1250m above sea level.

== Threats ==
Anthosachne falcis is designated At Risk - Declining. While no specific threats have been identified, it is found within a narrow range which is vulnerable to habitat loss, through increasing urbanisation, agricultural intensification, and the expansion of the Central Otago wine industry.

== Biology ==
Anthosachne falcis is both chasmogamous (meaning it has flowers open to cross-pollination) and cleistogamous (with flowers that do not open), and is capable of self-pollination.

It flowers from October-February, and then fruits from November-March, with seeds being dispersed by wind and attachment.

Following the removal of cattle grazing from Lake Tekapo Scientific Reserve, A. falcis increased in abundance, despite a shared increase in the abundance of invasive hawkweeds (Pilosella officinarum). The results suggest that while A. falcis is potentially vulnerable to grazing, it is not vulnerable to the prominent dryland weed Pilosella.

== Taxonomy ==
Before 1994, what is now considered A. falcis was considered part of the widespread species now called Anthosachne scabra, named Group Tekapo II. Then, along with A. sacandros, both species were described for the first time in the genus Elymus, as E. aprica and E. sacandros. In 2011, genetic analysis showed that the Australasian Elymus were distinct from Elymus elsewhere, and were moved into the resurrected genus Anthosachne, hence the present name Anthosachne falcis.

=== Etymology ===
The name 'Anthosachne' comes from the Greek 'anthos', meaning flower, and 'achne' , meaning scale, probably referring to the sterile upper florets of the spikelets.

The name 'falcis' refers to the sickle shape of the leaf-blades.

== Gallery ==
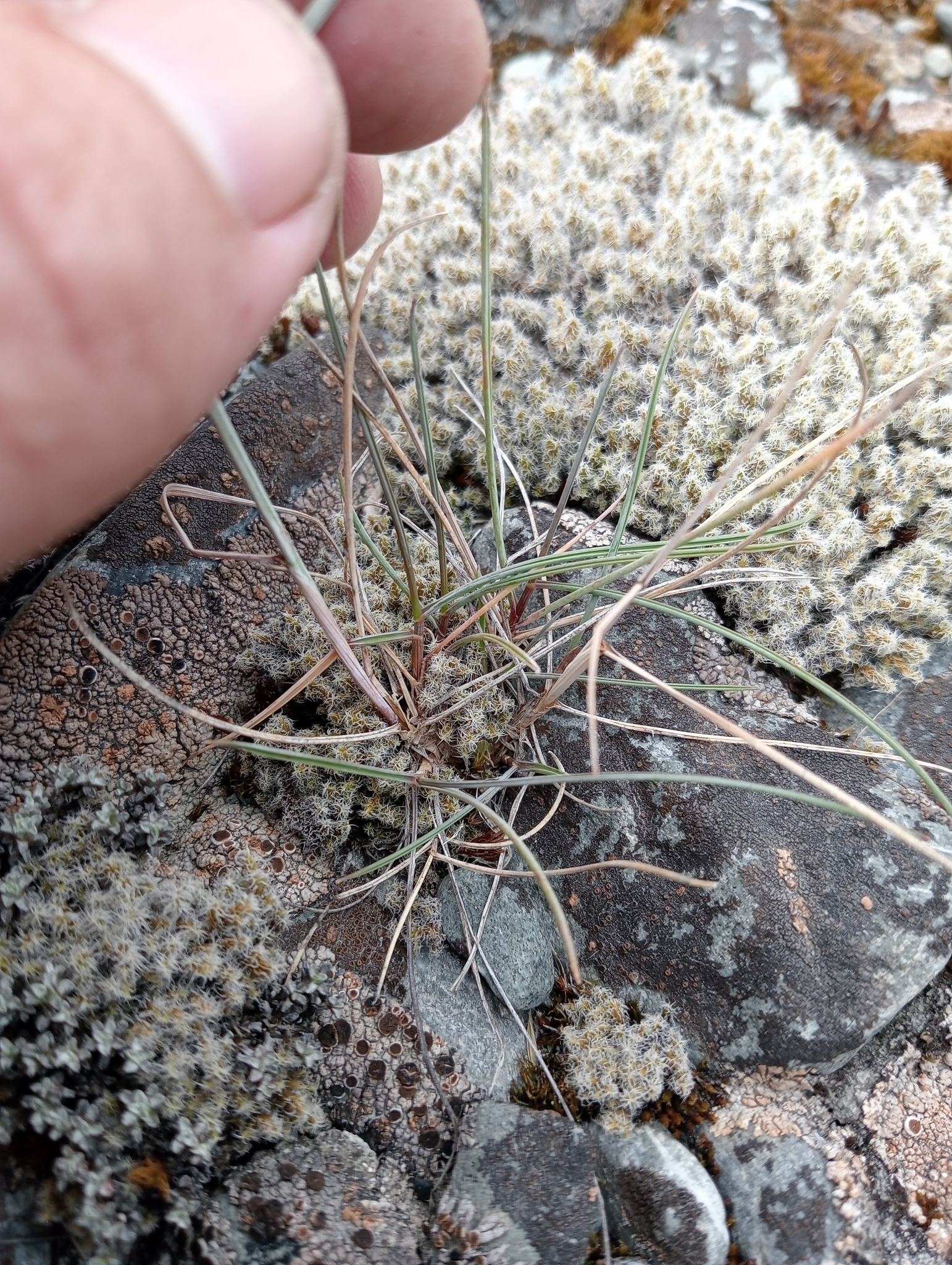

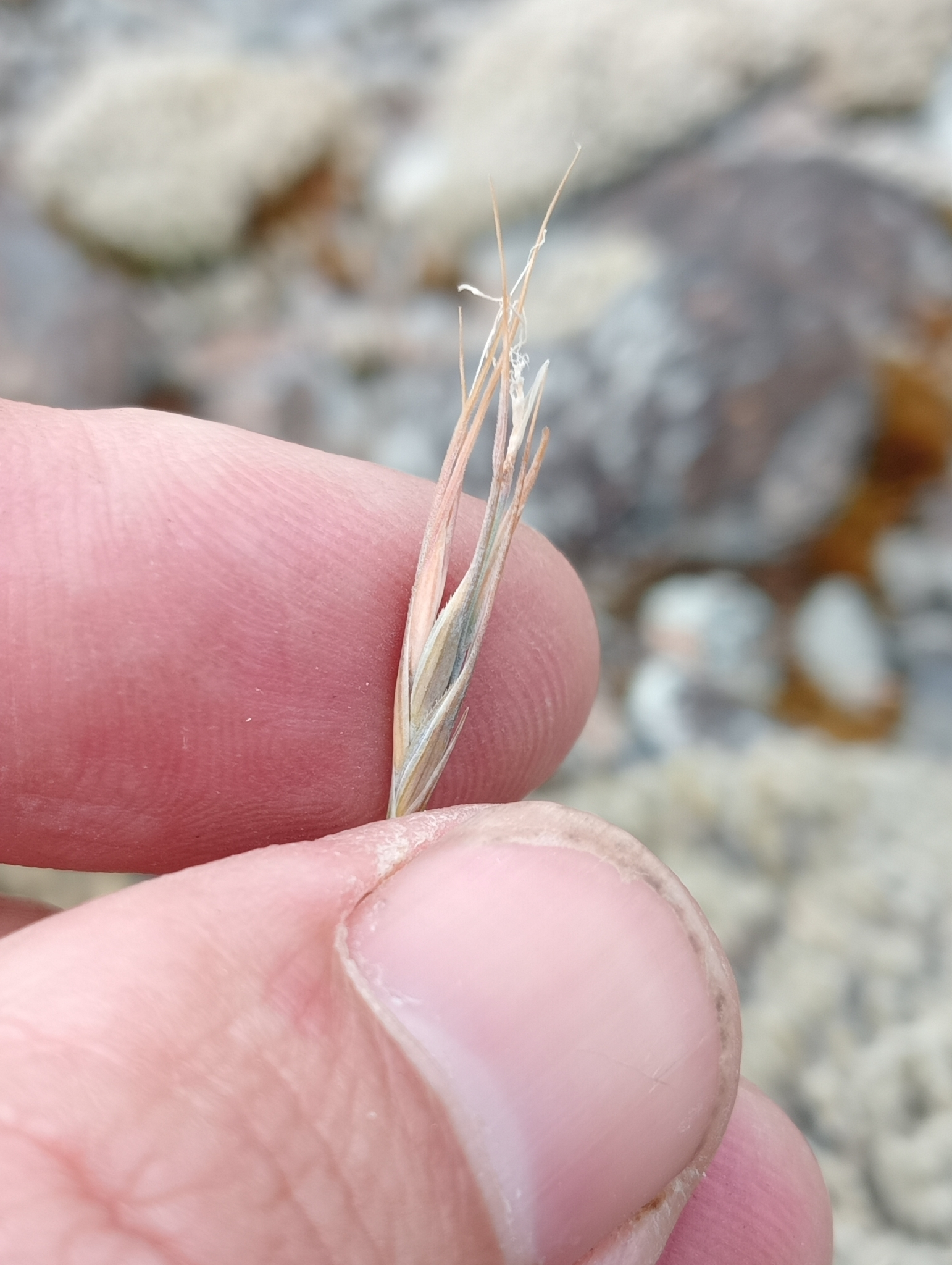
A. falcis spikelet
