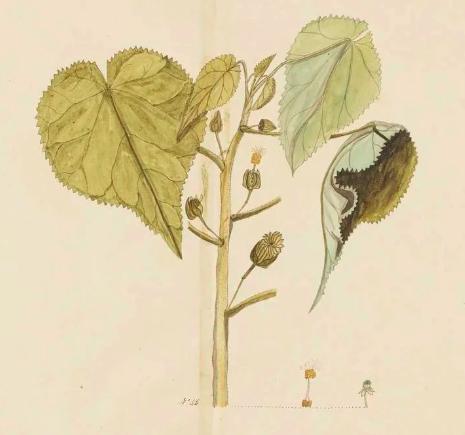
- (John Doody, State Library of New South Wales)

Conservation status
- Critically endangered (EPBC Act)

Scientific classification
- Kingdom: Plantae
- Clade: Tracheophytes
- Clade: Angiosperms
- Clade: Eudicots
- Clade: Rosids
- Order: Malvales
- Family: Malvaceae
- Genus: Abutilon
- Species: A. julianae

Binomial name
- Abutilon julianae Endl.

= Abutilon julianae =

Species of flowering plant

Abutilon julianae is a small shrub of the genus Abutilon believed endemic to Norfolk Island and nearby Phillip Island.

== History ==
It was first recorded on Norfolk Island in 1792 by convict artist John Doody, and on Phillip Island by Ferdinand Bauer in 1804-05 where he collected the type specimen. It appears not to have been recorded on Phillip Island after 1804-05 and on Norfolk Island was last seen about 1912. For more than seventy years it was considered extinct, apparently killed out by grazing stock.

Norfolk Island abutilon is a shrub that grows to about one metre tall or more, with grey, downy, heart-shaped leaves 3–9 cm long and young stems covered in dense star-shaped hairs. In the past its main threat was grazing and habitat degradation by feral goats, pigs and rabbits on Phillip Island and by cattle on Norfolk Island. Phillip Island became part of Norfolk Island National Park in 1996, and the Australian Government's species profile describes its population as key to the species' long-term survival.

The park has propagated the species in its nursery and planted it in the Norfolk Island Botanic Garden and at Palm Glen, Bird Rock and Captain Cook Landing Place. Plants have also been supplied to the regional council, the Kingston and Arthur's Vale Historic Area and private landowners. A recovery plan was required under the EPBC Act, and the species was placed on the Commenced List in 2009.

In the mid-1980s control of feral rabbits on nearby Phillip Island allowed plant seedlings to survive in accessible areas for the first time in more than one hundred years, and in 1985 some seedlings of Abutilon julianae were discovered. A. julianae was one of two plant taxa previously thought to be extinct that was rediscovered on the island, the other being Anthosachne kingiana subsp. kingiana.

This was one of the first unexpected bonus benefits of rabbit control (and subsequent eradication). Plants must have survived in the few cliff-bound places inaccessible to both rabbits and people to provide the source of seed for the newly discovered plants. The species is now widely grown on Norfolk Island and natural regeneration on Phillip Island is growing well, though still very rare. As the only natural population (with fewer than 50 plants known in 2003) is on Phillip Island it is endemic to that island although it has been propagated and widely planted on Norfolk Island. It is listed as Critically Endangered under Australia's Environment Protection and Biodiversity Conservation Act.
