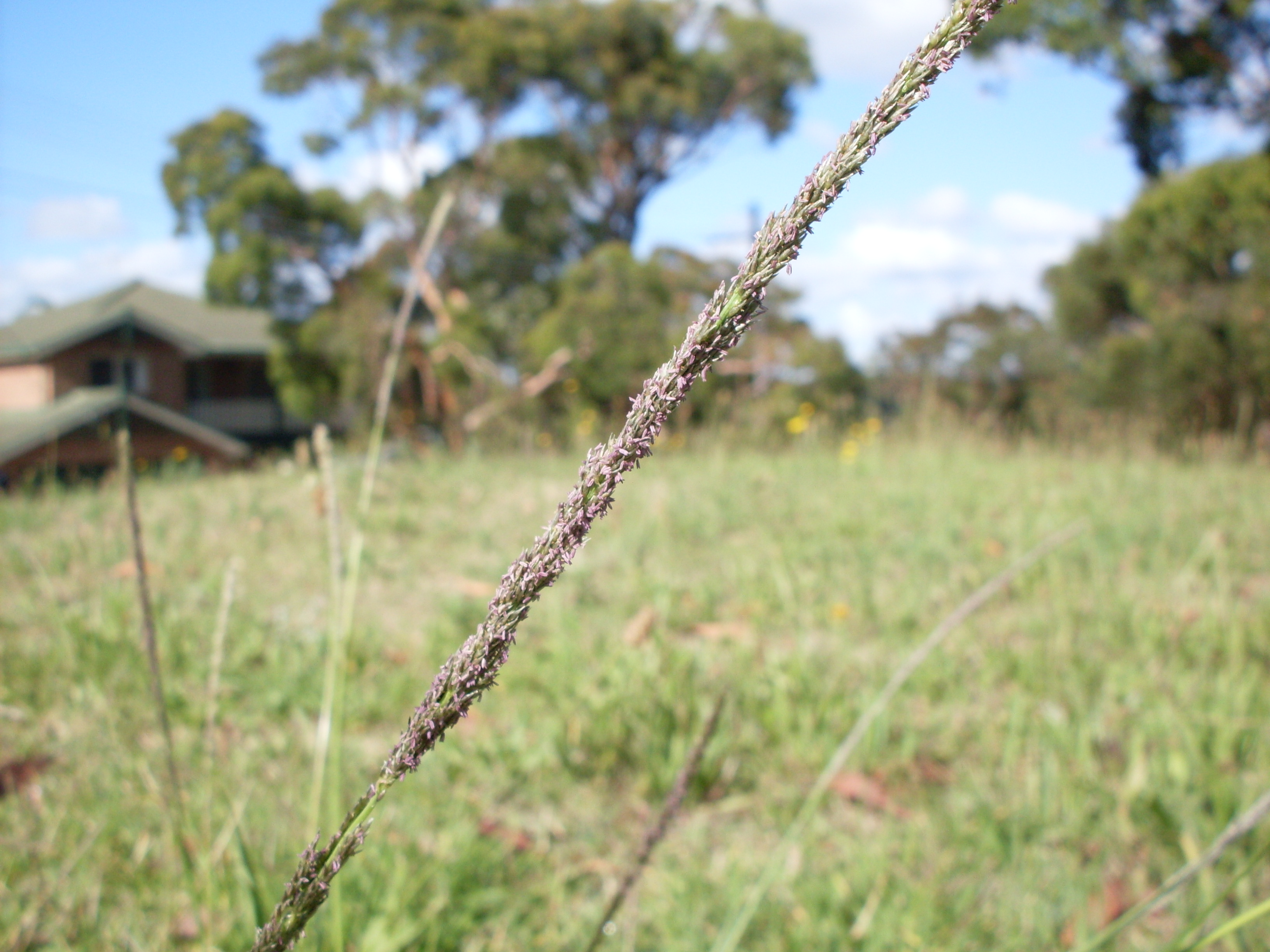

Conservation status
- Least Concern (IUCN 3.1)

Scientific classification
- Kingdom: Plantae
- Clade: Tracheophytes
- Clade: Angiosperms
- Clade: Monocots
- Clade: Commelinids
- Order: Poales
- Family: Poaceae
- Subfamily: Chloridoideae
- Genus: Sporobolus
- Species: S. africanus

Binomial name
- Sporobolus africanus (Poir.) Robyns & Tournay

= Sporobolus africanus =

Species of plant

Sporobolus africanus, or rat's tail grass, is a true grass in the tribe Zoysieae.

Sporobolus africanus is known by many common names, including African dropseed, African dropseed grass, dropseed grass, Indian rat's tail grass, Parramatta grass, rat tail grass, rat's tail, rat's tail grass, rats' tails, ratstail, ratstail dropseed, rattail dropseed, rat-tail grass, rattail grass, rattailgrass, rush grass, smut grass, smutgrass, tough dropseed, tufty grass, and tussock grass.

== Description ==
Sporobolus africanus is an erect, stiff, tufted, perennial grass. Leaves are 20–40cm long and 1–4mm wide, in-rolled, scabrid, and olive-green. The panicle is 9-22cm long, with a long, densely-packed grey-brown inflorescence, bearing 2.2-3mm spikelets with a single floret.

== Distribution ==
=== Native range ===
The native range for the species is southern and eastern Africa (from the Democratic Republic of Congo to South Africa), as well as Kenya, Eswatini, Ethiopia, Nigeria, Cameroon, Arabia, and Sri Lanka.

In South Africa, it occurs in Free State, Gauteng, KwaZulu-Natal, Limpopo, Mpumalanga, Northwest, and the Northern, Western and Eastern Cape Provinces.

=== Naturalised range ===
Sporobolus africanus is naturalised in Madagascar, Philippines, Australasia (Papua New Guinea, New Zealand, and Australia (including Lord Howe I., Norfolk I., and Kermadec I.)), throughout the Pacific (Cook Is., Easter Is., Hawaii, Niue, Tokelau-Manihiki, French Polynesia, Mariana Is.), Atlantic Ocean islands (the Azores, Canary Is., Madeira, Ascension, Tristan da Cunha, and St. Helena), and Indian Ocean islands (Mauritius and Réunion).

== Habitat ==
Sporobolus africanus typically grows in compacted soils and is well-suited to low-fertility. S. africanus is a grass of open areas, such as lawns and pastures, footpaths, parks, roadsides, disturbed sites, as well as native grasslands, open woodlands.

== Ecology ==
In cool-temperate South African grasslands, S. africanus is often associated with Eragrostis curvula, Cynodon dactylon and Hyparrhenia hirta, as well as herbs such as Walafrida densiflora, Solanum spp. and Wahlenbergia caledonica.

Sporobolus africanus is a prolific seed producer with an average of 300 seeds per inflorescence and as many as 3,600 seeds per square metre. Seeds become sticky when wet, allowing them to attach directly to animals, clothing, and machinery. S. africanus also has a tendency to build up long-lasting seedbanks, which can be further enable their spread through the spread of mud by machinery.

=== Invasiveness ===
Sporobolus africanus is specifically seen as invasive in New Zealand, Hawaii, and Australia.

In Australia, it arrived in the 19th century, either deliberately as a pasture plant our through seed contamination. It is largely an agricultural weed of pastures, given its low palatability that leads to a loss in productivity and reduced land values. It is an ecological weed in coastal areas and grasslands.

In New Zealand, it naturalised in 1840, and has spread throughout the North Island andnorthern South Island. Its spread has impacted Anthosachne kingiana subsp. multiflora, Austroderia splendens, Daucus glochidiatus, Echinopogon ovatus and Epilobium billardiereanum, as well as other lowland and coastal species.

On Hawaiʻi, S. africanus is one of several invasive weeds threatening the native herb Bidens micrantha subsp. kalealaha and shrub Brighamia insignis.

=== Natural enemies ===
Research was undertaken on natural enemies with potential to be used as biocontrol for Sporobolus sp. (including S. africanus) in Australia. Species identified included 70 insects and 23 plant pathogens. The leaf smut fungus Ustilago sporoboli-indici and the wasp Tetramesa sp. showed potential, however, the wasp could not be reared in laboratory conditions, and the smut also impacted native Australian Sporobolus.

The moth Herpetogramma licarsisalis was found feeding on grasses, including S. africanus in 1968 on Maui, Hawaiʻi (Davis, 1969).

== Photos ==
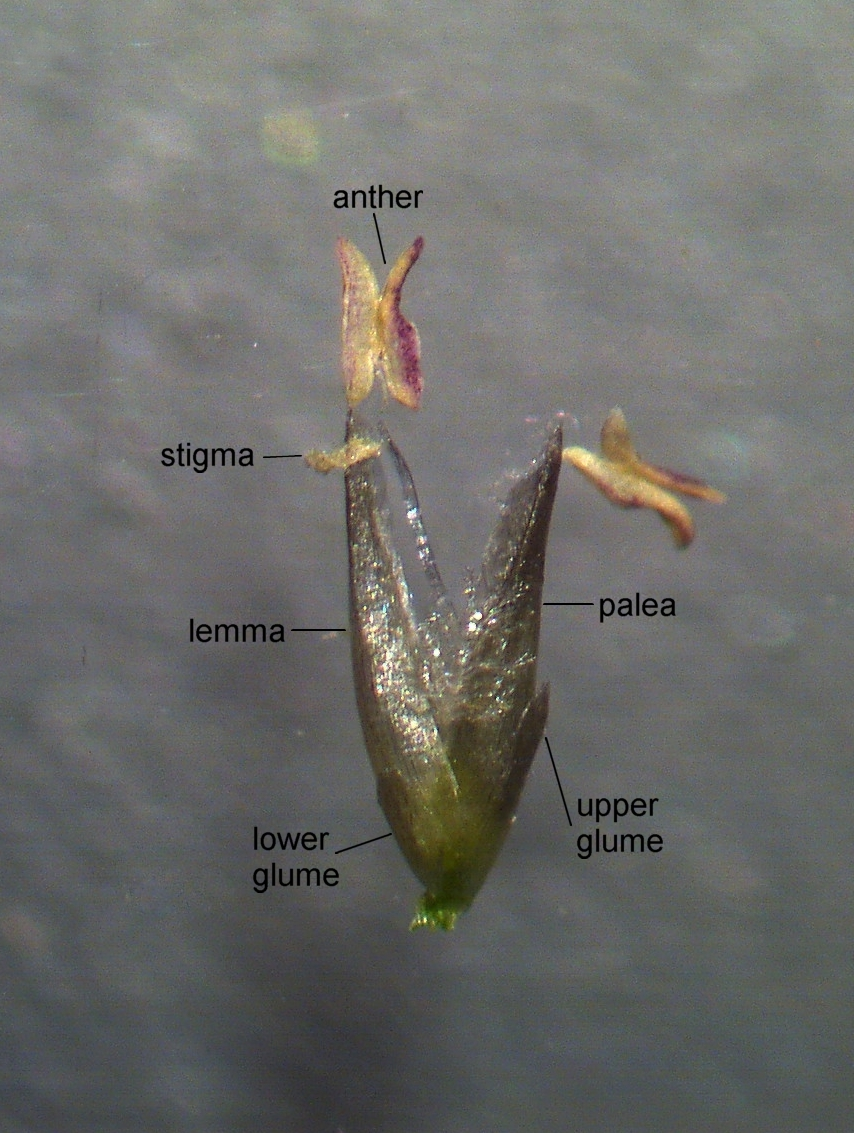
Labelled spikelet diagram

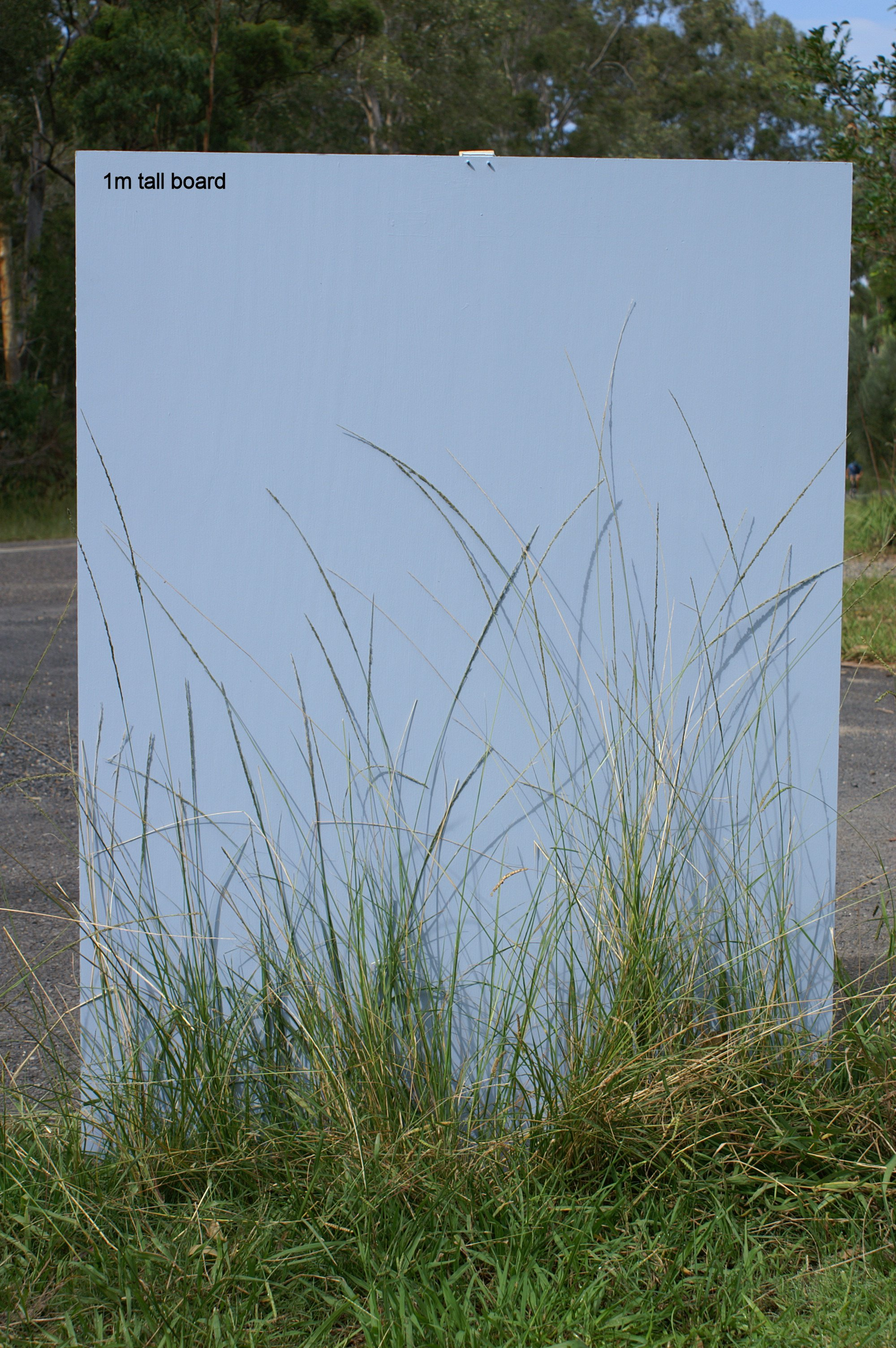
Profile photo
