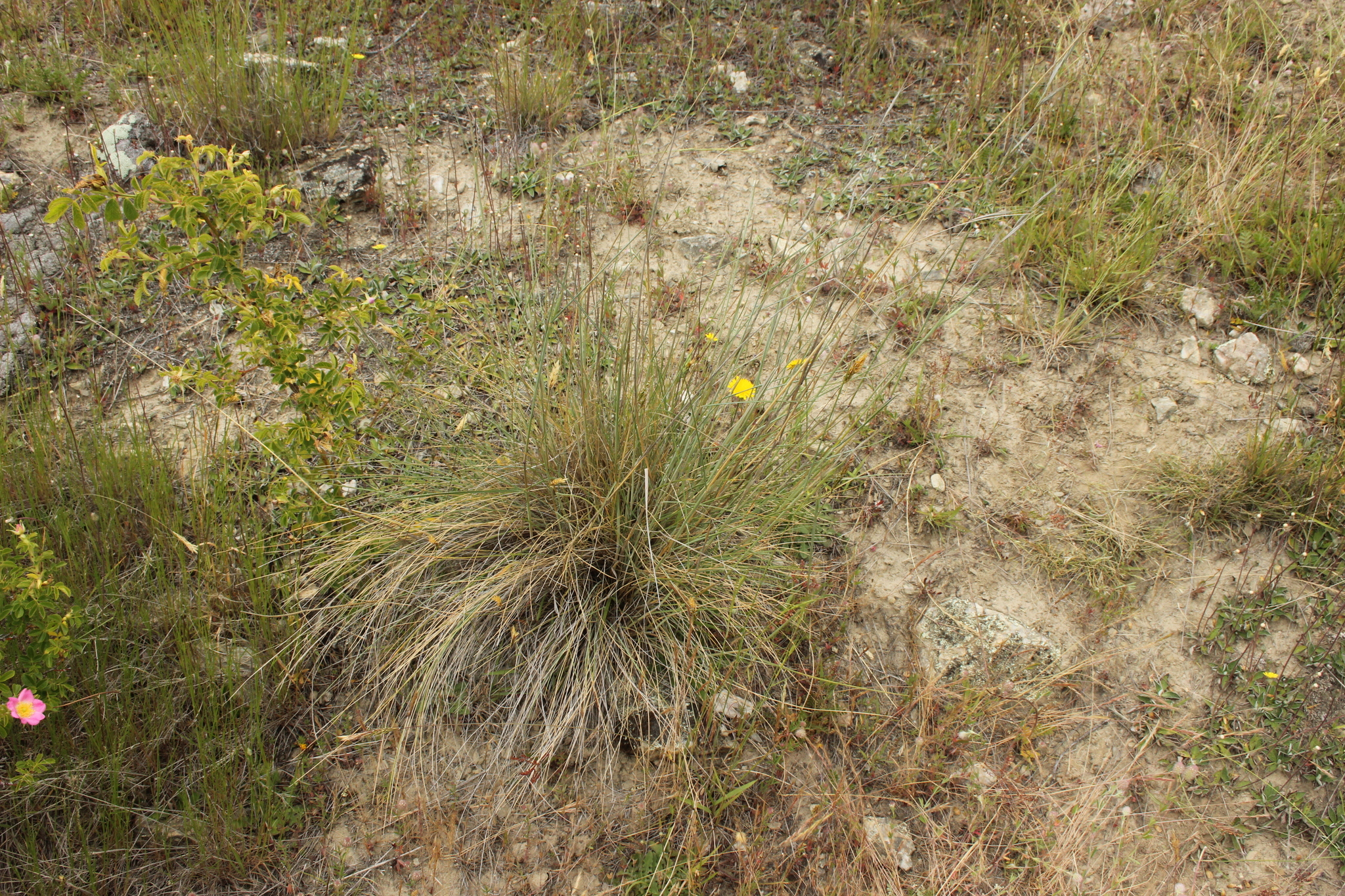

Conservation status
- Naturally Uncommon (NZ TCS)

Scientific classification
- Kingdom: Plantae
- Clade: Tracheophytes
- Clade: Angiosperms
- Clade: Monocots
- Clade: Commelinids
- Order: Poales
- Family: Poaceae
- Subfamily: Pooideae
- Genus: Anthosachne
- Species: A. aprica

Binomial name
- Anthosachne aprica (Á.Löve & Connor) C.Yen & J.L.Yang

= Anthosachne aprica =

Species of grass

Anthosachne aprica is a species of true grass of the tribe Triticeae. This species is endemic to New Zealand.

== Description ==
A. aprica is a large, glaucous, tussocky grass, with erect culms, bearing 3-7 30-50mm spikelets on a wide angle to the rachis, each containing 6-12 florets.

A. aprica is distinguished from all other New Zealand Anthosachne by its spikelets that diverge on a wide angle from the rachis. A. aprica is perhaps most similar to Connorochloa tenuis (formerly Elymus tenuis), which overlaps in part of its range with A. aprica. C. tenuis has trailing rather than erect culms.

== Distribution ==
A. aprica is endemic to the inland basins of Central Otago.

The type location is in "hillsides above Roxburgh town, Central Otago", collected in 1947.

== Habitat ==
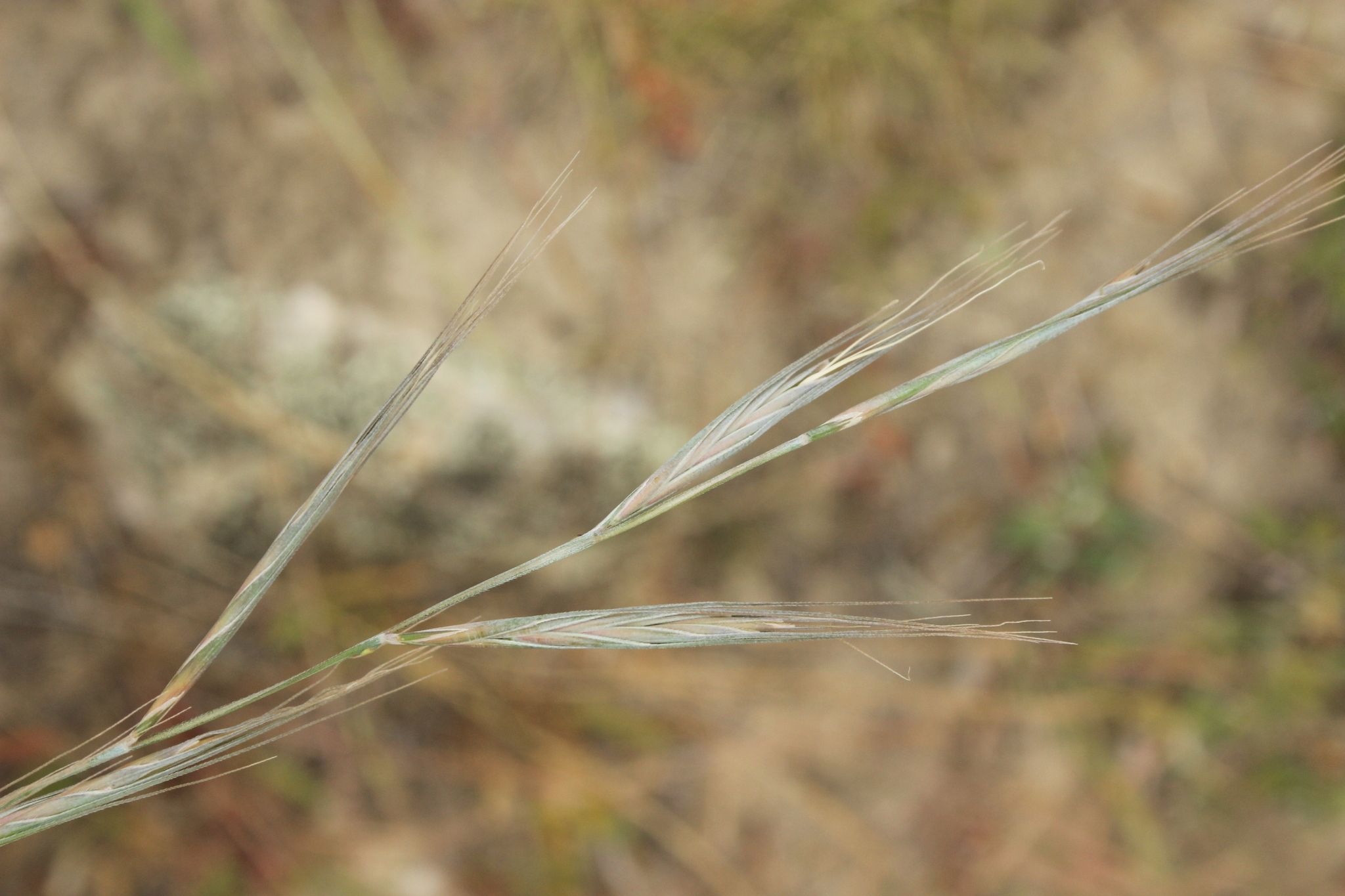
Showing diagnostic feature - spikelets being divergent from the rachis.

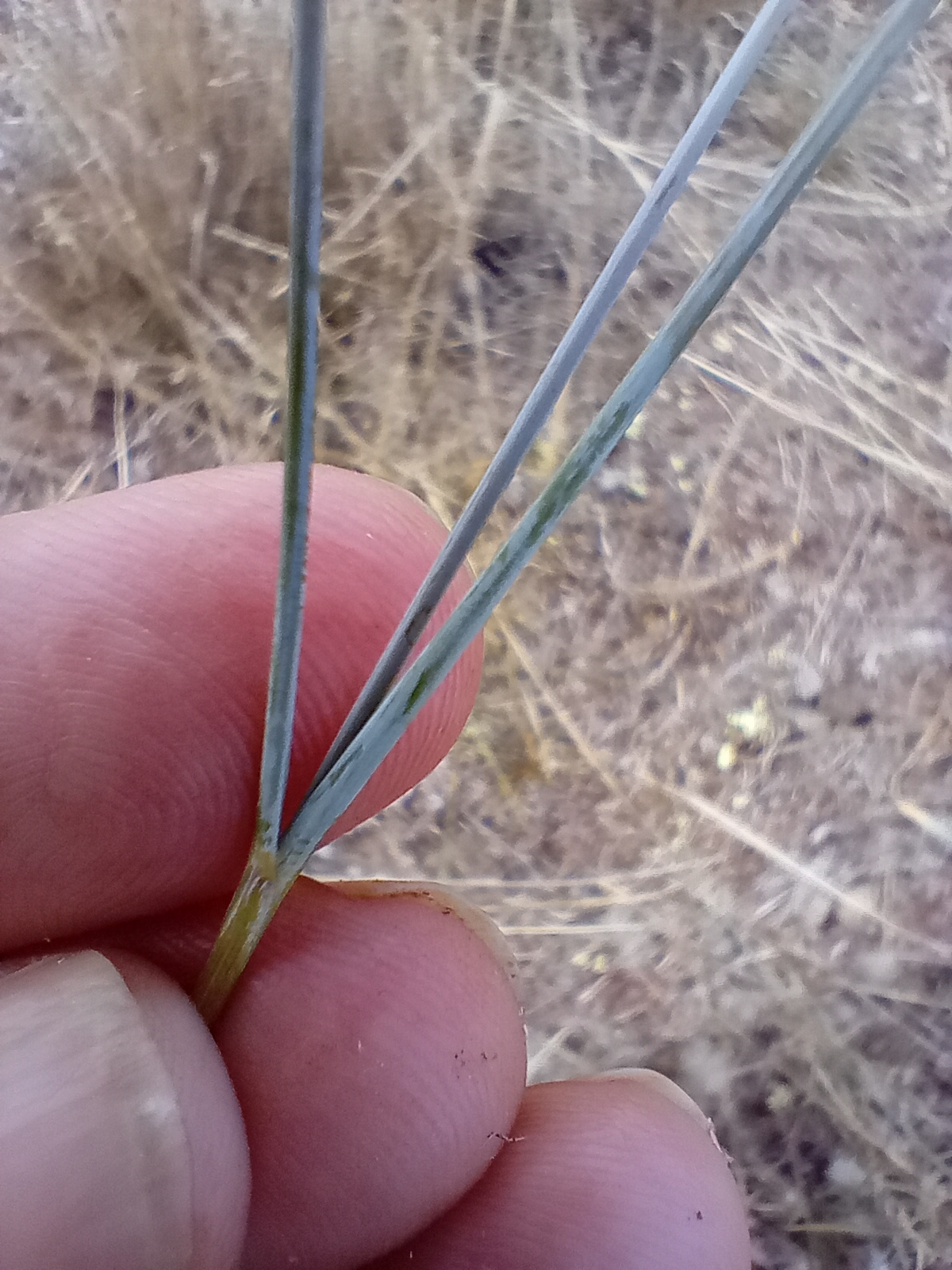
Glaucous leaves

A. aprica is found in lowland and montane open dry short-tussock (Festuca novae-zelandiae) grassland, between 150-500m above sea level.

Much of the distribution of A. aprica in Central Otago was once forested, until 800 years ago when forests were destroyed by fire following Polynesian settlement. Following this, large, dry native shrublands covered the area, until fires from European settlement in 1857 cleared it to make way for pasture. Following this, A. apricus, Poa cita, and Festuca novae-zelandiae became the three most common components of the resulting grassland community. As grazing became more intense, the more palatable A. aprica declined, in favour of the least palatable Festuca novae-zelandiae. Today, A. aprica is largely relegated to refugia from introduced mammals.

== Threats ==
A. aprica is classified as At Risk - Naturally Uncommon, though there is limited information on the population size or trend. It has retained this classification since 2009, 2012, and 2017, but was classified as Range Restricted in 2004 (a classification that no longer exists in the NZTCS).

While A. aprica is not believed to be threatened, it is a narrow-range endemic to drylands that are increasingly experiencing habitat loss through the expansion of the wine industry, agricultural intensification, and urban development.

In Otago, A. aprica is classified as Regionally Vulnerable, with an area of <100ha, and a potential decline of 10-30%.

The exotic plant thyme (Thymus vulgaris) is invasive in drylands inhabited by A. aprica. A 2015 study found that A. aprica seed germination declined around 10% in the presence of thyme, with allelopathic chemicals thymol and carvocrol being implicated.

== Taxonomy ==
Before 1982, what is now considered A. aprica was considered part of the widespread species now known as Anthosachne scabra. Then, for the first time, it was originally described in the genus Elymus, as E. aprica. In 2011, genetic analysis showed that the Australasian Elymus were distinct from Elymus elsewhere, and were moved into the resurrected genus Anthosachne, hence the present name Anthosachne aprica.

=== Etymology ===
The name Anthosachne comes from the Greek anthos, meaning flower, and achne , meaning scale, probably referring to the sterile upper florets of the spikelets.

The name 'aprica' refers to the open sunny habitat in which the species is found. 'Aprica' comes from the Latin aperiō, meaning open, or uncovered. The modern definition is sunny, or warmed by the sun.

== Biology ==
A. aprica flowers from October-February, and fruits from November-April. Its flowers are chasmogamous, meaning they are out-crossing, once they have emerged from the inflorescence. They are also self-compatible, however. Seeds are dispersed by wind and attachment.

The chromosome count of A. aprica is 2n = 42.
