= Senecio howeanus =

Scientific classification
- Kingdom: Plantae
- Clade: Tracheophytes
- Clade: Angiosperms
- Clade: Eudicots
- Clade: Asterids
- Order: Asterales
- Family: Asteraceae
- Genus: Senecio
- Species: S. howeanus

Binomial name
- Senecio howeanus Belcher

Species of herb

Senecio howeanus is an annual, or short-lived perennial, herb in the daisy family, Asteraceae. The specific epithet refers to the type locality.

== Description ==
The plant grows up to 40 cm in height. The leaves are alternate, 4 cm long, 1.2 cm wide. The flowers occur in cymose inflorescences; they have 8–10 yellow outer florets with 15–25 funnel-shaped disc florets. The fruit is brown and 2.2–2.5 mm long.

== Distribution and habitat ==
The plant is endemic. to Australia’s subtropical Lord Howe Island in the Tasman Sea. It is common near the shoreline of the island, including its adjacent islets, with a scattered distribution at higher elevations.
