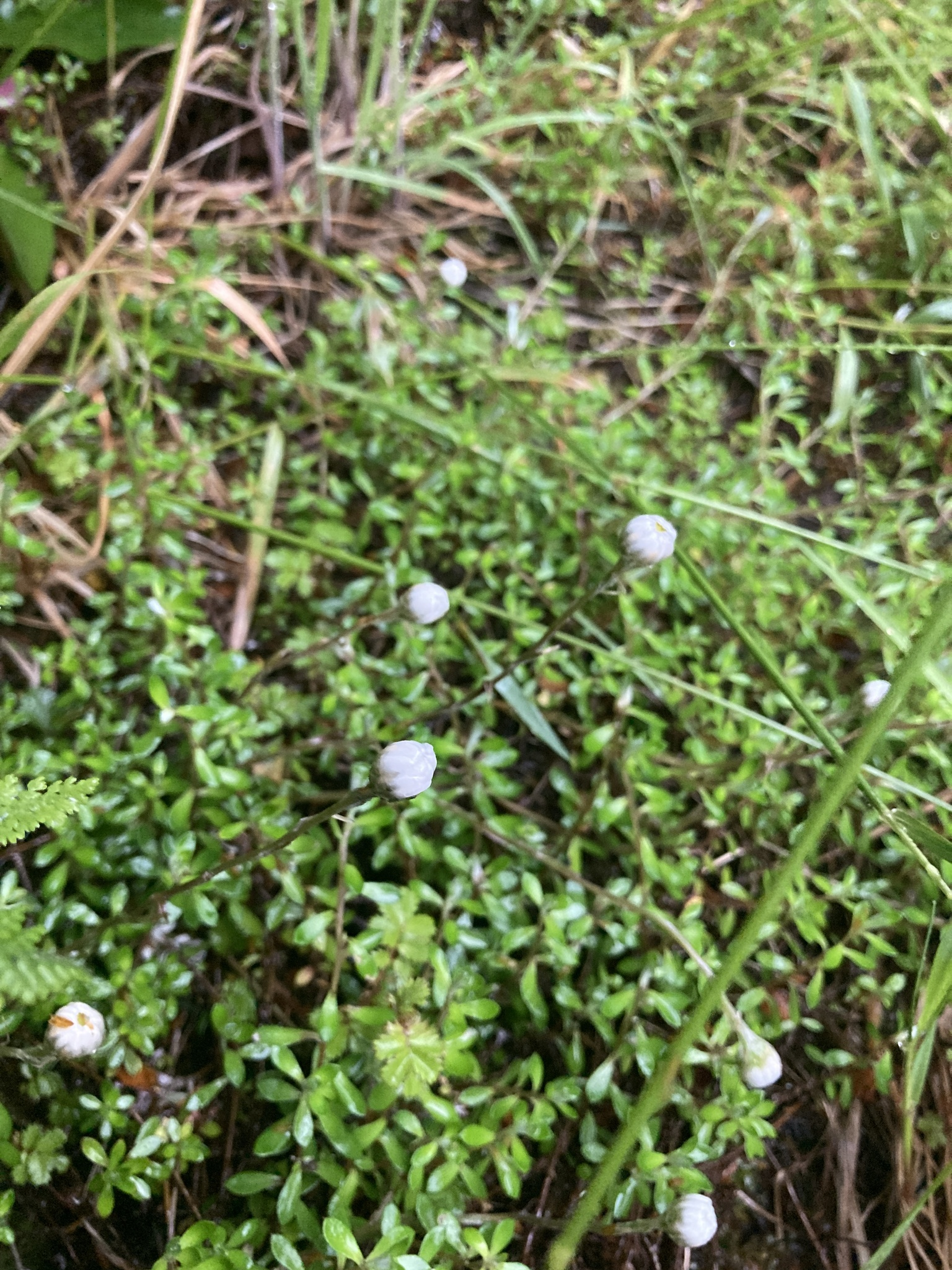
- Helichrysum filicaule from Mount Aspiring National Park

Conservation status
- Not Threatened (NZ TCS)

Scientific classification
- Kingdom: Plantae
- Clade: Tracheophytes
- Clade: Angiosperms
- Clade: Eudicots
- Clade: Asterids
- Order: Asterales
- Family: Asteraceae
- Genus: Helichrysum
- Species: H. filicaule

Binomial name
- Helichrysum filicaule Hook.f.

= Helichrysum filicaule =

Species of flowering plant

Helichrysum filicaule, the creeping everlasting daisy, is a species of small flower, endemic to New Zealand.
