= Festuca scabra =

Scientific classification
- Kingdom: Plantae
- Clade: Tracheophytes
- Clade: Angiosperms
- Clade: Monocots
- Clade: Commelinids
- Order: Poales
- Family: Poaceae
- Subfamily: Pooideae
- Genus: Festuca
- Species: F. scabra

Binomial name
- Festuca scabra Vahl (1791)

Species of grass

Festuca scabra is a species of grass in the family Poaceae. It is native to Eswatini, Lesotho, and South Africa. It is a perennial and grows in subtropical biomes. It was first described in 1791.
