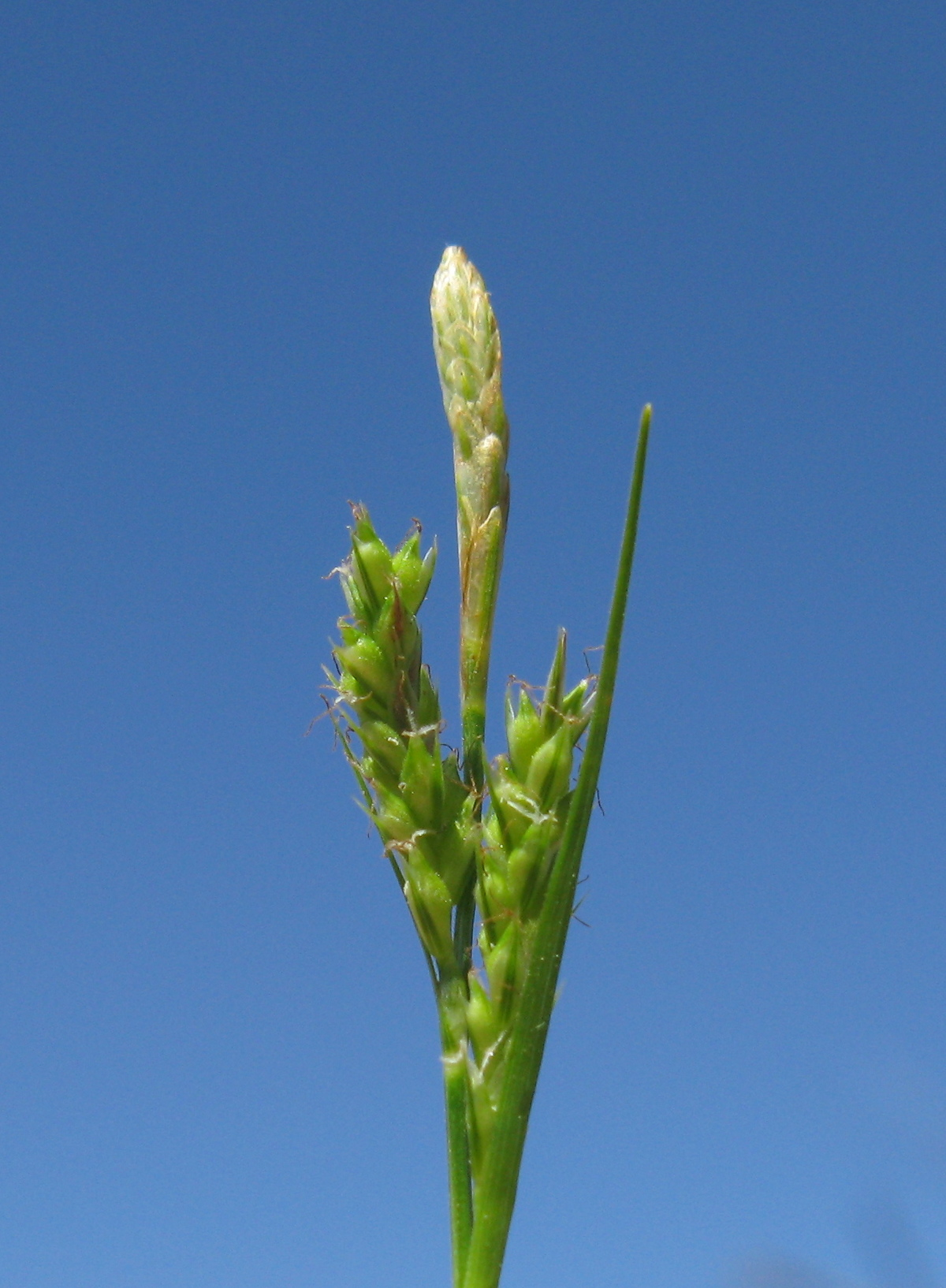
- Inflorescence

Scientific classification
- Kingdom: Plantae
- Clade: Tracheophytes
- Clade: Angiosperms
- Clade: Monocots
- Clade: Commelinids
- Order: Poales
- Family: Cyperaceae
- Genus: Carex
- Species: C. breviculmis

Binomial name
- Carex breviculmis R.Br.

Synonyms
- List: Carex aphanandra Franch. & Sav.; Carex boniana Boeckeler; Carex breviculmis subsp. fibrillosa (Franch. & Sav.) T.Koyama; Carex breviculmis var. stipitata Kük.; Carex breviculmis var. typica Domin; Carex brevis S.T.Blake; Carex bulbostylis Kük.; Carex candolleana H.Lév. & Vaniot; Carex conorrhyncha Nelmes; Carex discoidea Boott; Carex eggytera Steud.; Carex fibrillosa Franch. & Sav.; Carex filiculmis Franch. & Sav.; Carex horikawae K.Okamoto; Carex langsdorffii Boott; Carex leucochlora Bunge; Carex leucochlora f. fibrillosa (Franch. & Sav.) K.T.Fu; Carex leucochlora var. horikawae (K.Okamoto) Katsuy.; Carex leucochlora var. morrisonicola (Hayata) Katsuy.; Carex lonchophora Ohwi; Carex morrisonicola Hayata; Carex pallens Z.P.Wang; Carex perangusta Ohwi; Carex perciliata (Kük.) Nelmes; Carex puberula Boott; Carex royleana Nees; Carex tosaensis Akiyama; Carex tricholoma S.T.Blake; Carex wardiana H.Lév. & Vaniot

= Carex breviculmis =

Species of grass-like plant

Carex breviculmis, called the Asian shortstem sedge, is a species of flowering plant in the genus Carex, native to Asia from the Indian subcontinent to Southeast Asia, China, Taiwan, Korea, Japan, north as far as Khabarovsk Krai, and Malesia, New Guinea, Australia, Norfolk Island and New Zealand. It has been introduced to the US state of Mississippi. Typically found in forests, it is quite shade tolerant.

== Subtaxa ==
The following varieties are currently accepted:

- Carex breviculmis var. breviculmis
- Carex breviculmis var. discoidea (Boott) Boott – Japan
- Carex breviculmis var. fibrillosa (Franch. & Sav.) Matsum. & Hayata – China, South Korea, Japan, Taiwan
- Carex breviculmis var. montivaga (S.T.Blake) Noot. – New Guinea
- Carex breviculmis var. perciliata Kük. – Malesia to New Guinea
- Carex breviculmis var. puberula (Boott) Makino – Japan
