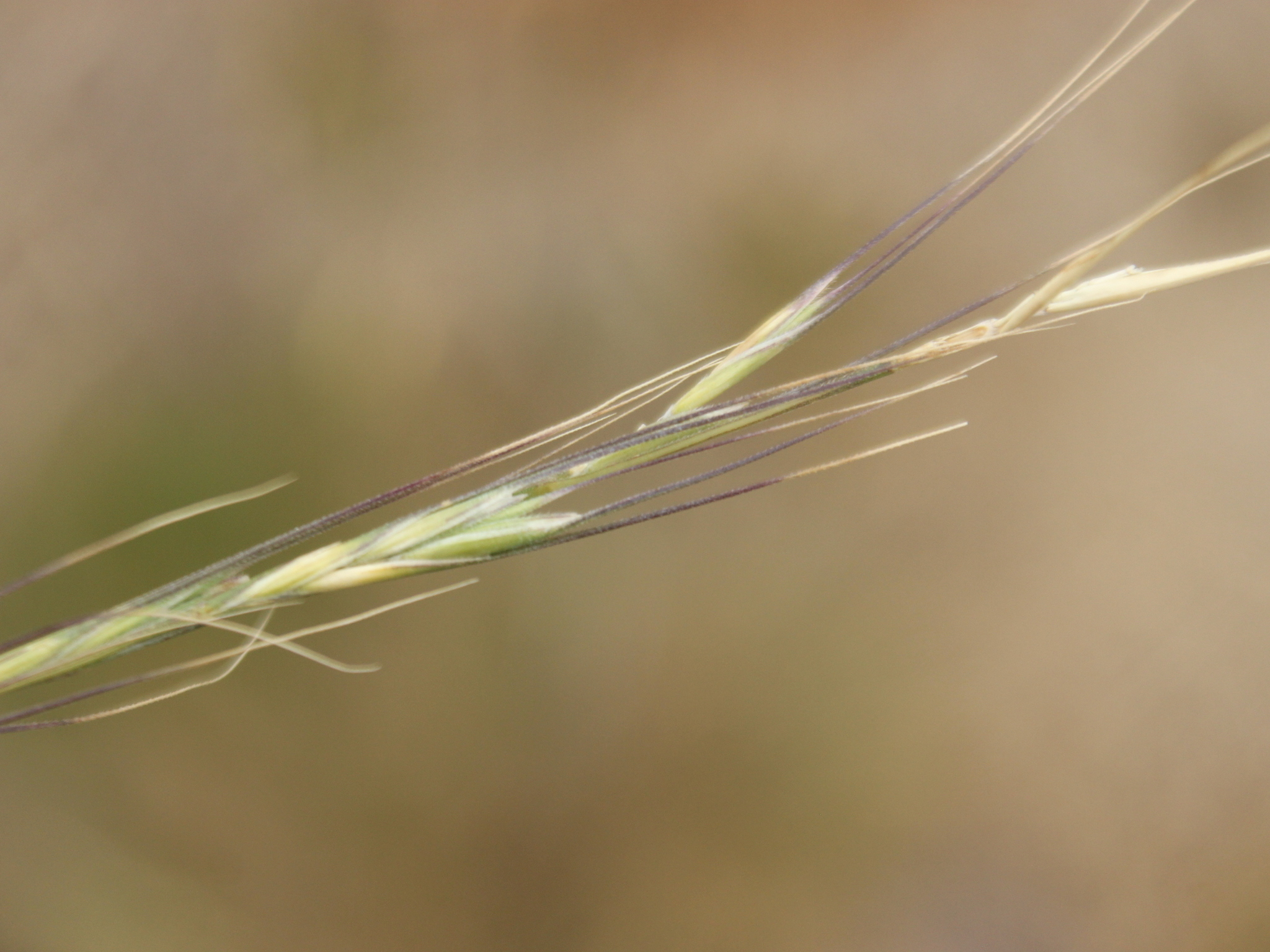
- flowerhead of A. scabra

Scientific classification
- Kingdom: Plantae
- Clade: Tracheophytes
- Clade: Angiosperms
- Clade: Monocots
- Clade: Commelinids
- Order: Poales
- Family: Poaceae
- Subfamily: Pooideae
- Genus: Anthosachne
- Species: A. scabra

Binomial name
- Anthosachne scabra (R.Br.) Nevski (1934)

= Anthosachne scabra =

Species of grass

Anthosachne scabra is a species of true grass of the tribe Triticeae. This species is found in New Zealand and Australia.

== Description ==
A. scabra is an open, hairy grass with long drooping inflorescences with more-or-less straight awned spikelets. Its branching can be intravaginal and extravaginal. Culms are less than 1.5 m (4 ft 11 in), slender, and often curved. They bare up to 6–12 spikelets which are 40–55 mm (1.6–2.2 in) long (or 15–35 mm (0.59–1.38 in) long not including awns), each with 5–10 florets. The lemma bears a long, scabrid, straight awn 30–50 mm (1.2–2.0 in) long.

In New Zealand, A. scabra is most similar to A. solandri, from which it can be distinguished by its long, slender, curved culms; green coarsely hirsute rather than glaucous leaf-blades; and blunt, truncate to retuse palea apexes, rather than pointed bifid apexes. Its awns are normally straight, rather than recurved.

== Distribution ==
A. scabra is endemic to Australia, and is found in Queensland, Victoria, Tasmania, South Australia, New South Wales, and Western Australia.

In New Zealand, A. scabra was long believed to be native, under the name Elymus rectisetus, but has more recently been recognised as naturalised, likely from grass seed imported from Australia. It is likely to have been a very early naturalisation, with some records dating back to 1843.

In New Zealand, it is found throughout the North Island, but is rare in Waikato and Northland. In the South Island, it is found throughout, but is rare in Westland and Southland, and absent from Fiordland.

The type location is unknown, but was somewhere in Tasmania, likely between Recherche Bay and D'Entrecasteaux Channel to Storm Bay and the Derwent River estuary as far as Glenorchy Rivulet.

== Habitat ==
A. scabra is a grass of well-drained soils, such as rocky areas, poor pastures, waste places and roadsides. In New Zealand, it is found from sea level to 1,250 m (4,100 ft) above sea level.

In Australia, A. scabra comprises a number of more or less distinctive forms, including highly glaucous alpine and subalpine forms in Victoria. In grasslands north and west of Melbourne is a form with culms that elongate up to 2 m (6 ft 7 in) long at maturity, and become almost prostrate. This form however has no distinctive floral characteristics, so is not recognised as distinct.

== Biology ==
In Australia, A. scabra flowers from September–March, and fruits from March–April. A. scabra's flowers can be chasmogamous or cleistogamous, meaning it can either self-pollinate or out-cross.

=== Natural enemies ===
Anther filaments can be infected with eelworms, causing them to become swollen. The rust pathogen Puccinina graminis f. sp. tritici is commonly found on A. scabra in Australia, on which it can act as a reservoir for infection on nearby cultivated wheat.

=== Pseudogamous apospory ===
In A. scabra, reproductive processes are highly variable between populations. In some populations, reproduction occurs entirely asexually, through pseudogamous apospory. This is where embryos are produced by nonreproductive cells in the sporophyte, but require male gametes (sperm) in order to produce the endosperm. While both eggs and sperm are used to produce the seed, it only retains the DNA of the female gamete.

This finding was spurred on by the initial discovery of variable chromosome numbers between wild populations. Chromosome numbers included populations with 'normal' 2n = 42, as well as 2n = 43, 2n = 63, and 2n = 57. This led to the suspicion that different populations had to be using different reproductive modes, given that individuals with irregular chromosome numbers would be incapable of ordinary meiosis. Pollination experiments were subsequently undertaken, where 1600 flowers of apomictic populations were emasculated (had anthers removed), and failed to set seed, indicating that sperm played some part in asexual reproduction. Following this, observations of the development of embryos, endosperm and the seed confirmed that despite populations being apomictic, they required sperm to produce endosperm.

The four populations studied varied in their modes of reproduction:

1. In Wellington, the population was completely sexual, with uniform chromosome numbers (2n = 42).
2. In Foxton, the population was facultatively apomictic - as in, meisis and fertilisation was liable to fail, but could also produce productive haploid and triploid plants. This population had sexual, asexual, and semi-sexual individuals with different numbers of chromosomes.
3. In Dunstan, the population was predominantly apomictic, where meiosis was suppressed on the female side, but not the male side.
4. In Waiau, the population was obligately apomictic, where meiosis of both male and female sides was suppressed, resulting in entirely asexual reproduction.

== Taxonomy ==
A. scabra was originally described as Festuca scabra in 1805 by Jacques Labillardière. The location given was "capite Van-Diemen", which translates to Cape Van Diemen, a general location that Labillardière lumped all of his Tasmanian collections under. At the time, Bass Strait had not been discovered by Europeans (nor was it until 1797), so the name likely comes from the assumption that Tasmania was a cape of mainland Australia. While such a location does not exist in Tasmania, he was believed to have visited somewhere in from Recherche Bay and D'Entrecasteaux Channel to Storm Bay and the Derwent River estuary. However, the name Festuca scabra was already taken by another species in 1791, and is therefore Nomen illegitimum.

Yen et al refer to A. scabra as a variety of a different species, Anthosachne australasica var. scabra.

A. scabra (R.Br.) Nevski (1934) has many synonyms. These include homotypic synonyms (those based on the same type specimen) and heterotypic synonyms (those based on different type specimens; see triple bar). These are the following, sourced from nzflora:

Homotypic synonyms	Heterotypic synonyms
Festuca scabra Labill. (1805) nom. illeg.	Vulpia brauniana Nees (1843)
Triticum scabrum R.Br. (1810)	Festuca billardierei Steud. (1854) – as Festuca billardieri
Agropyron scabrum (R.Br.) P.Beauv. (1812)	Triticum youngii Hook.f., Handb. New Zealand Fl. 343 (1864)
Vulpia scabra (R.Br.) Nees (1843)	
Elymus scaber (R.Br.) Á.Löve, Feddes Repert. Spec. Nov. Regni Veg. 95: 468 (1984)	
Festuca brauniana (Nees) Walp. (1849)	
Agropyron youngii (Hook.f.) P.Candargy (1901)	
Roegneria scabra (R.Br.) J.L.Yang & C.Yen (1990)	
Anthosachne australasica var. scabra (R.Br.) C.Yen & J.L.Yang, Xiao mai zu sheng wu xi tong xue 223 (2006)	

== Gallery ==
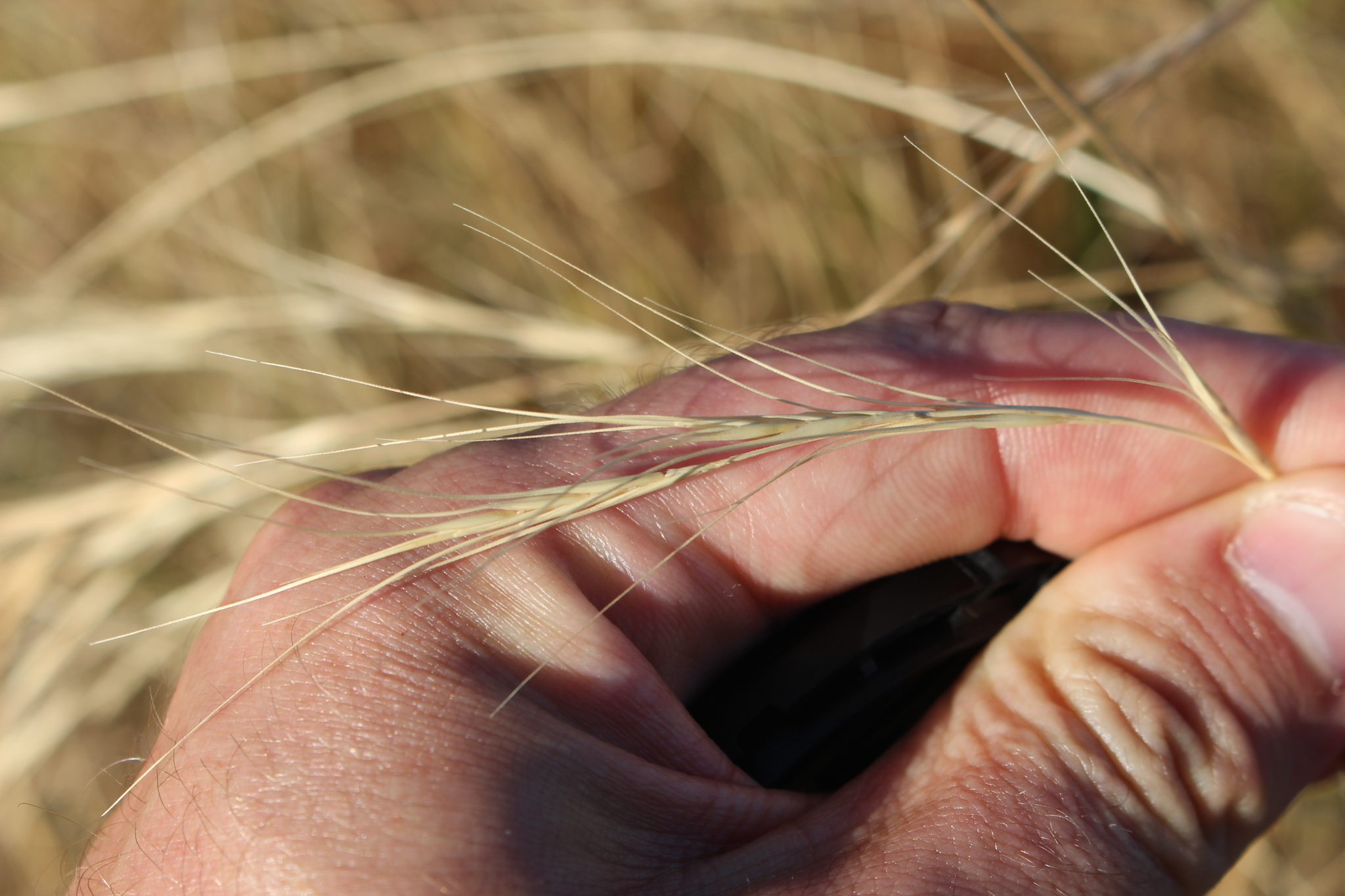
A. scabra spikelets, showing straight awns

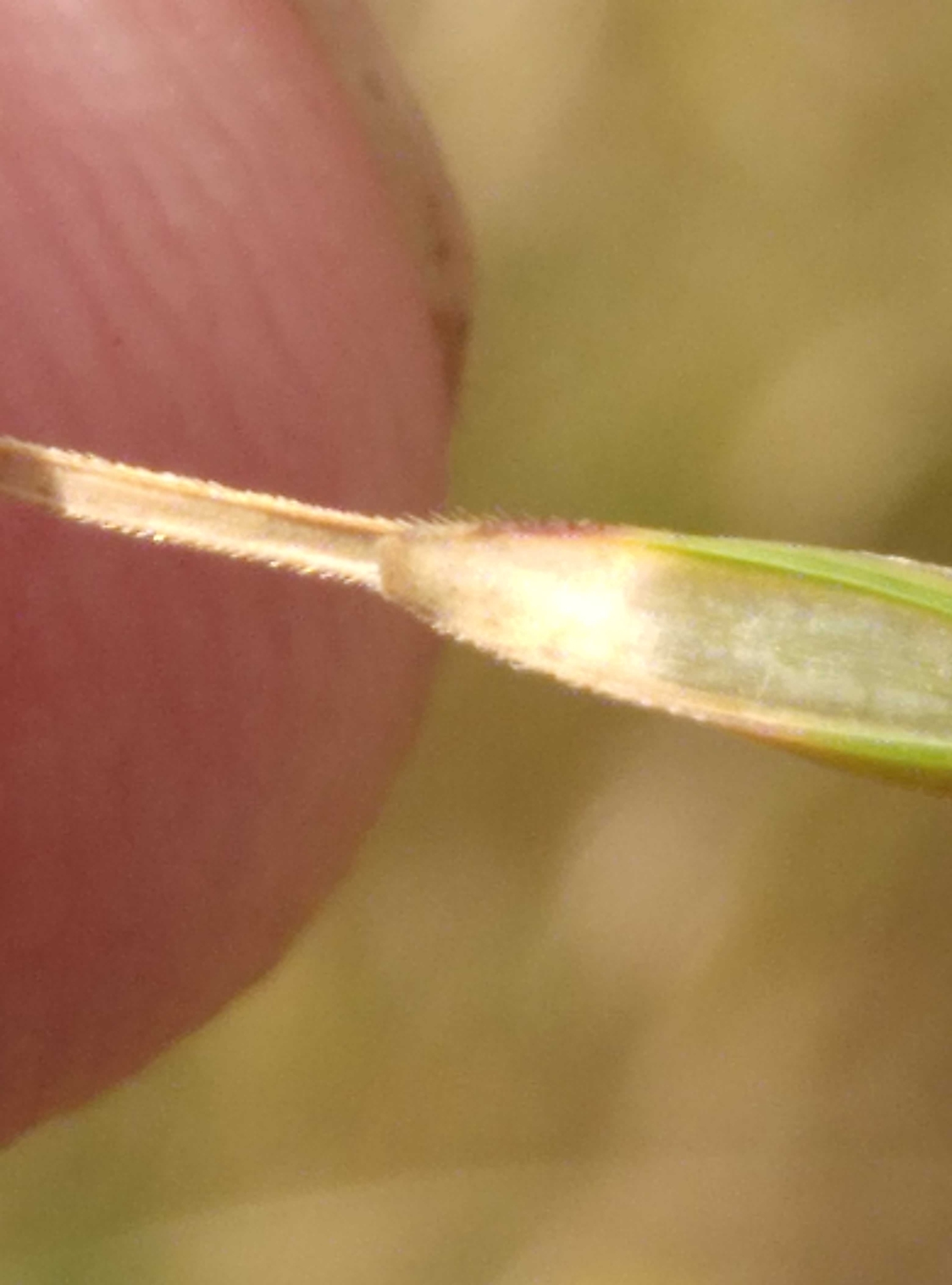
Blunt palea apex

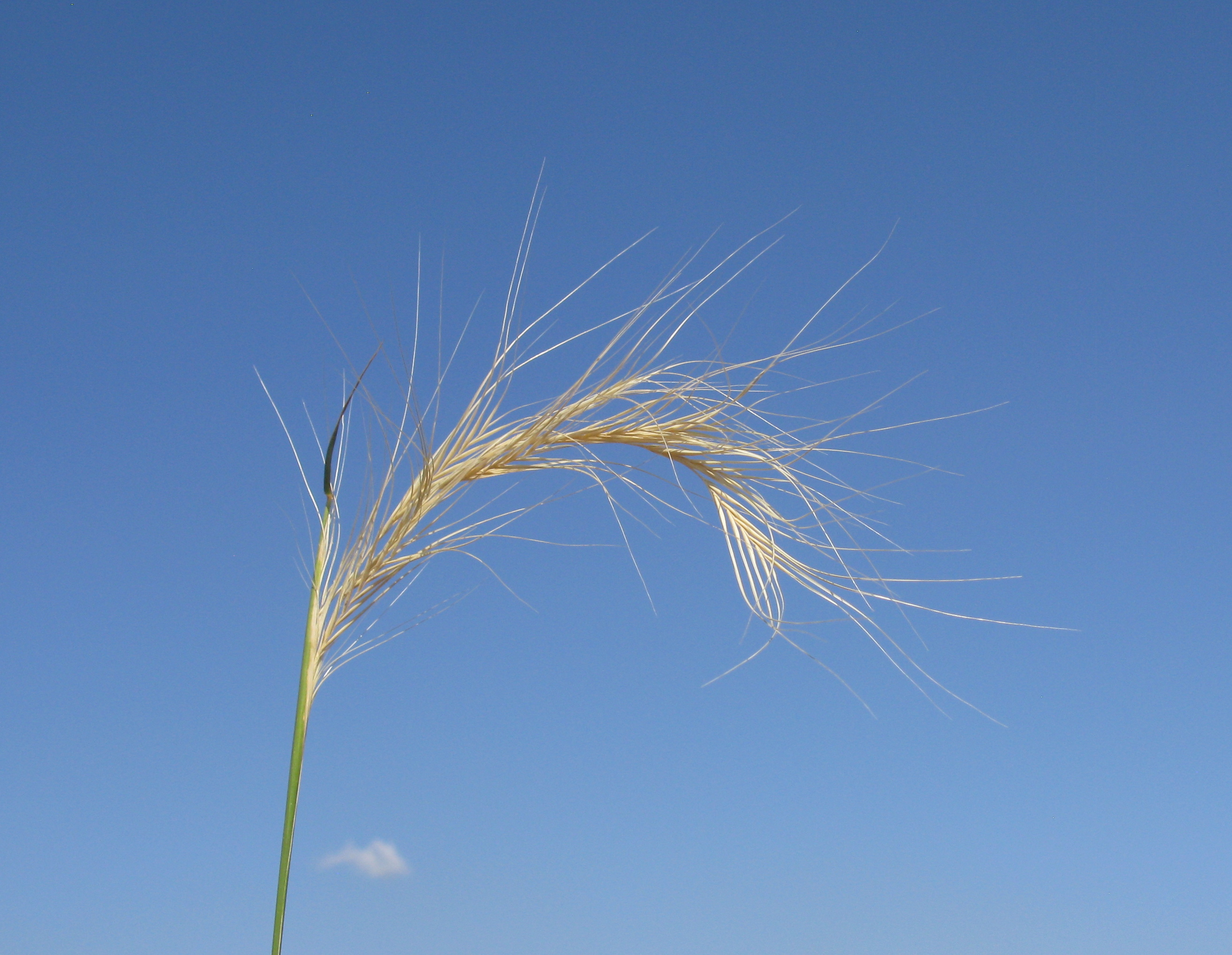
Inflorescence

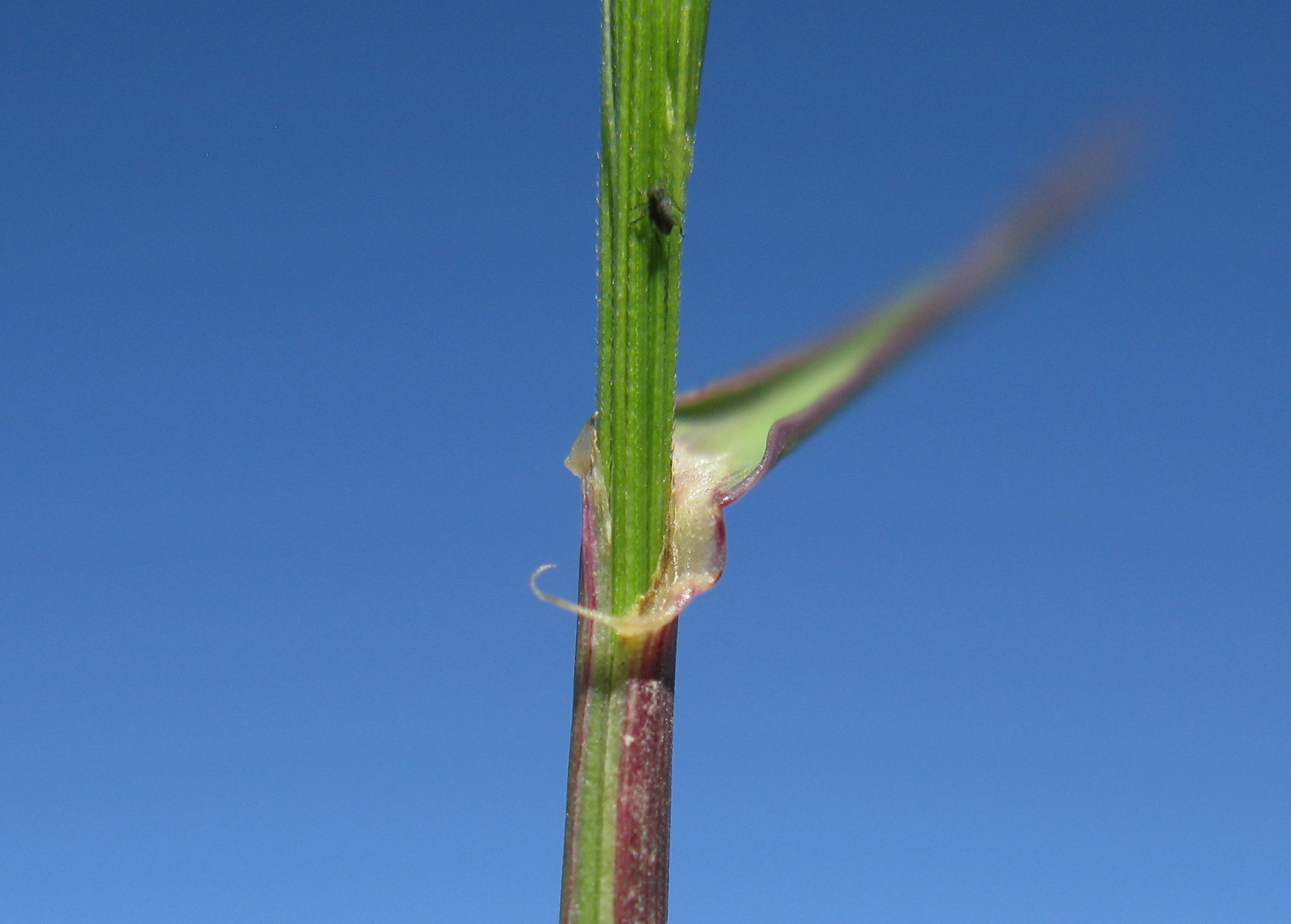
Auricle

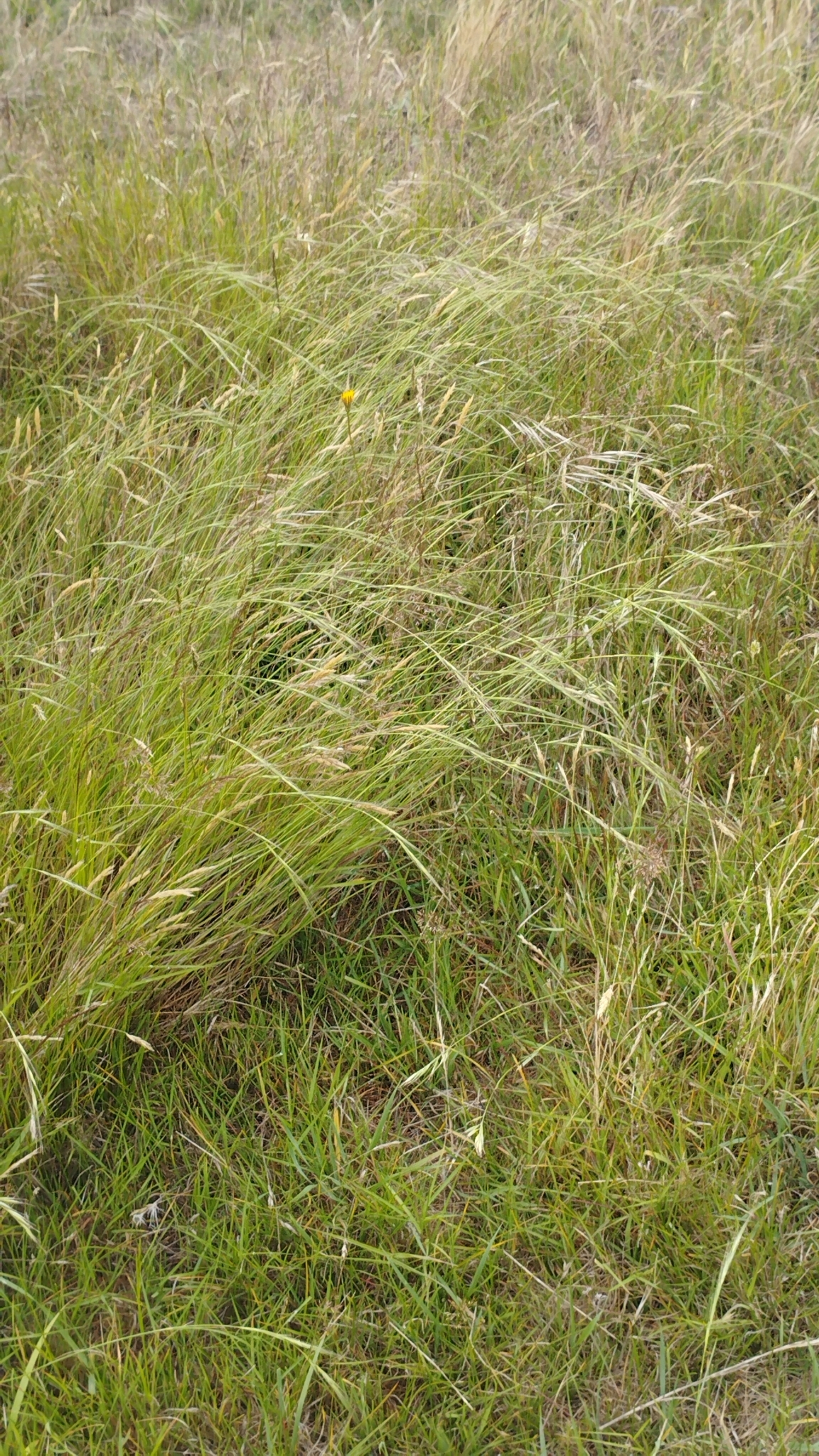
A. scabra habit. Long, slender, curved culms.

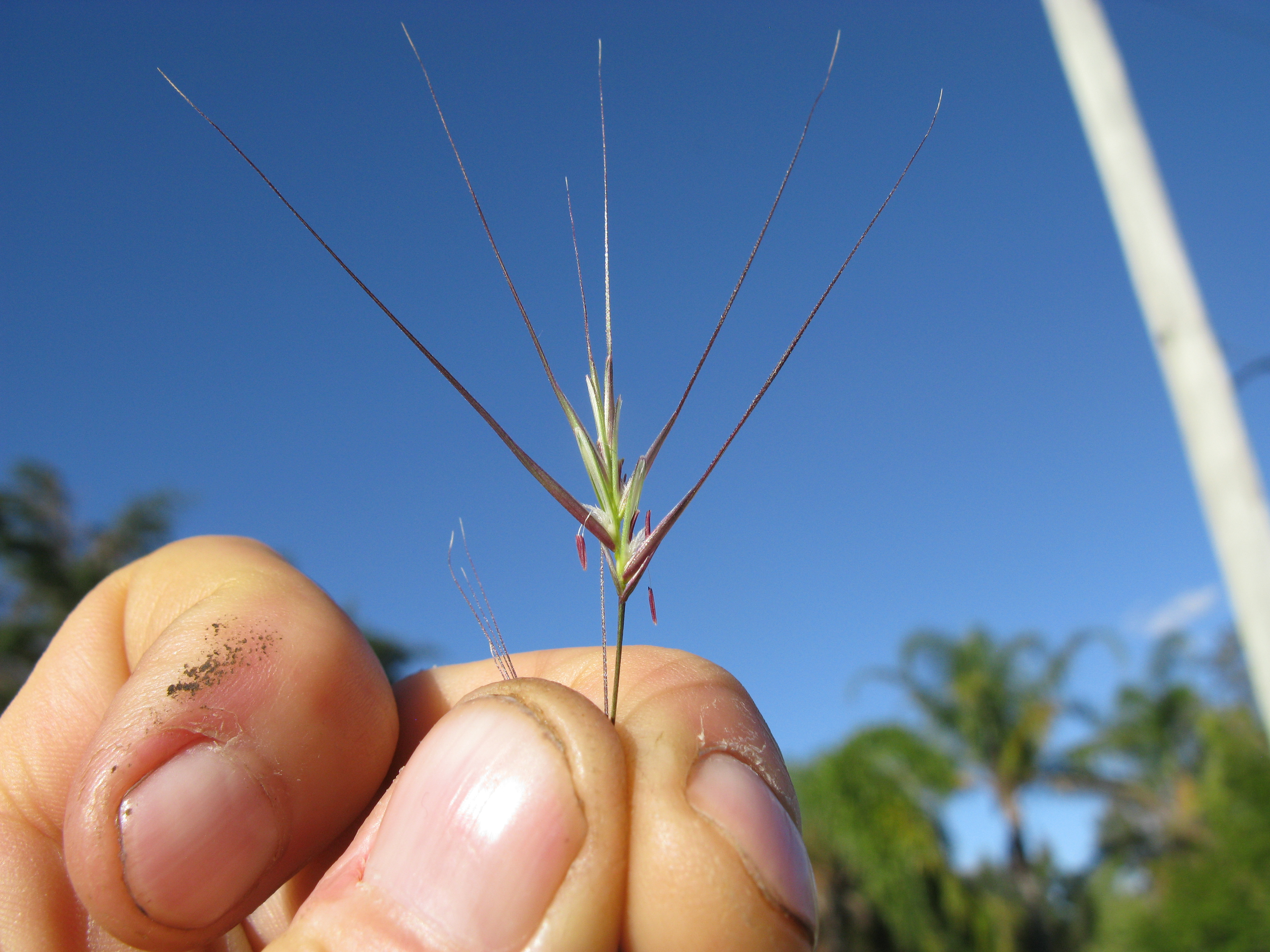
Spikelet

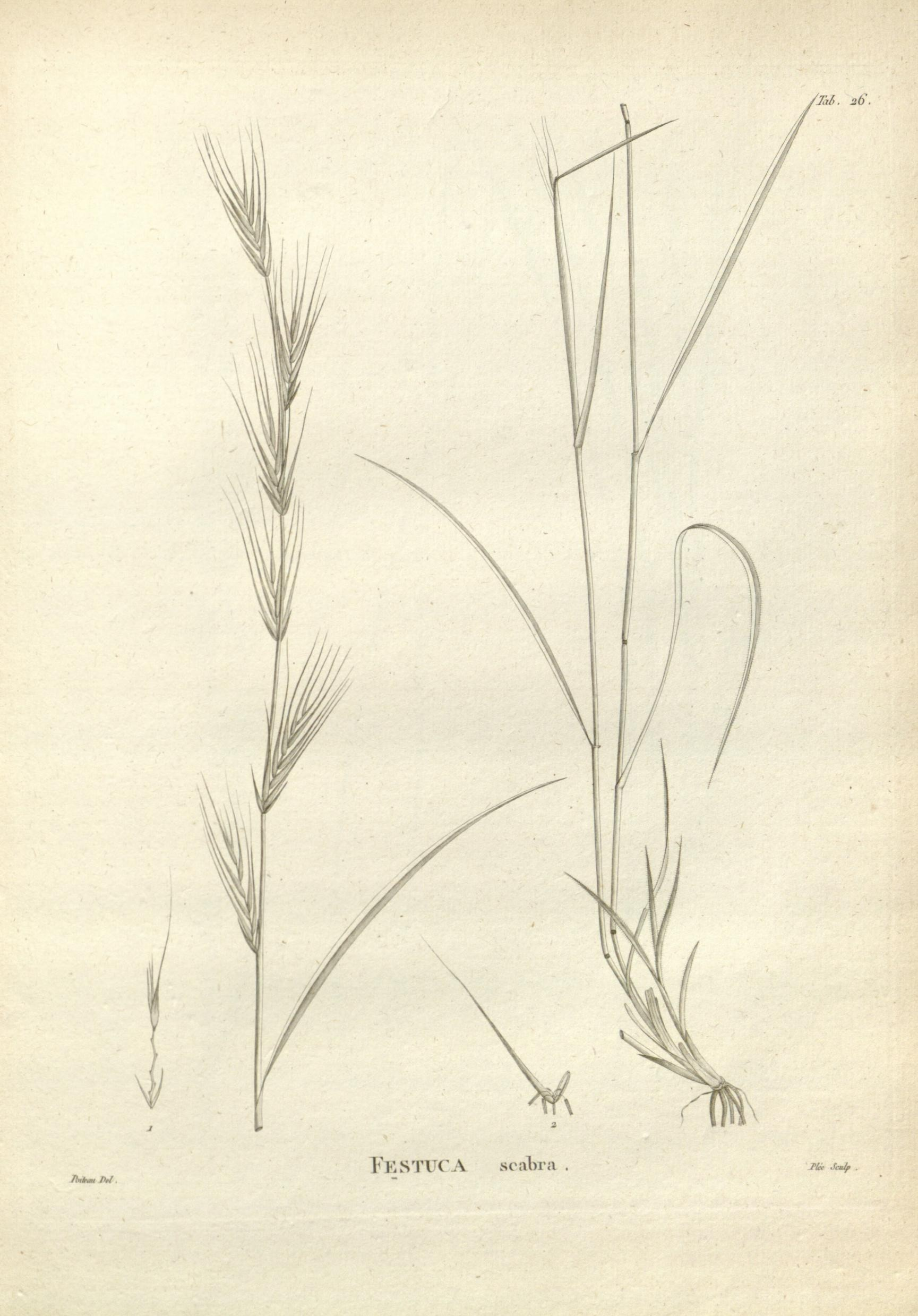
Specimen from Novæ Hollandiæ Plantarum Specimen
