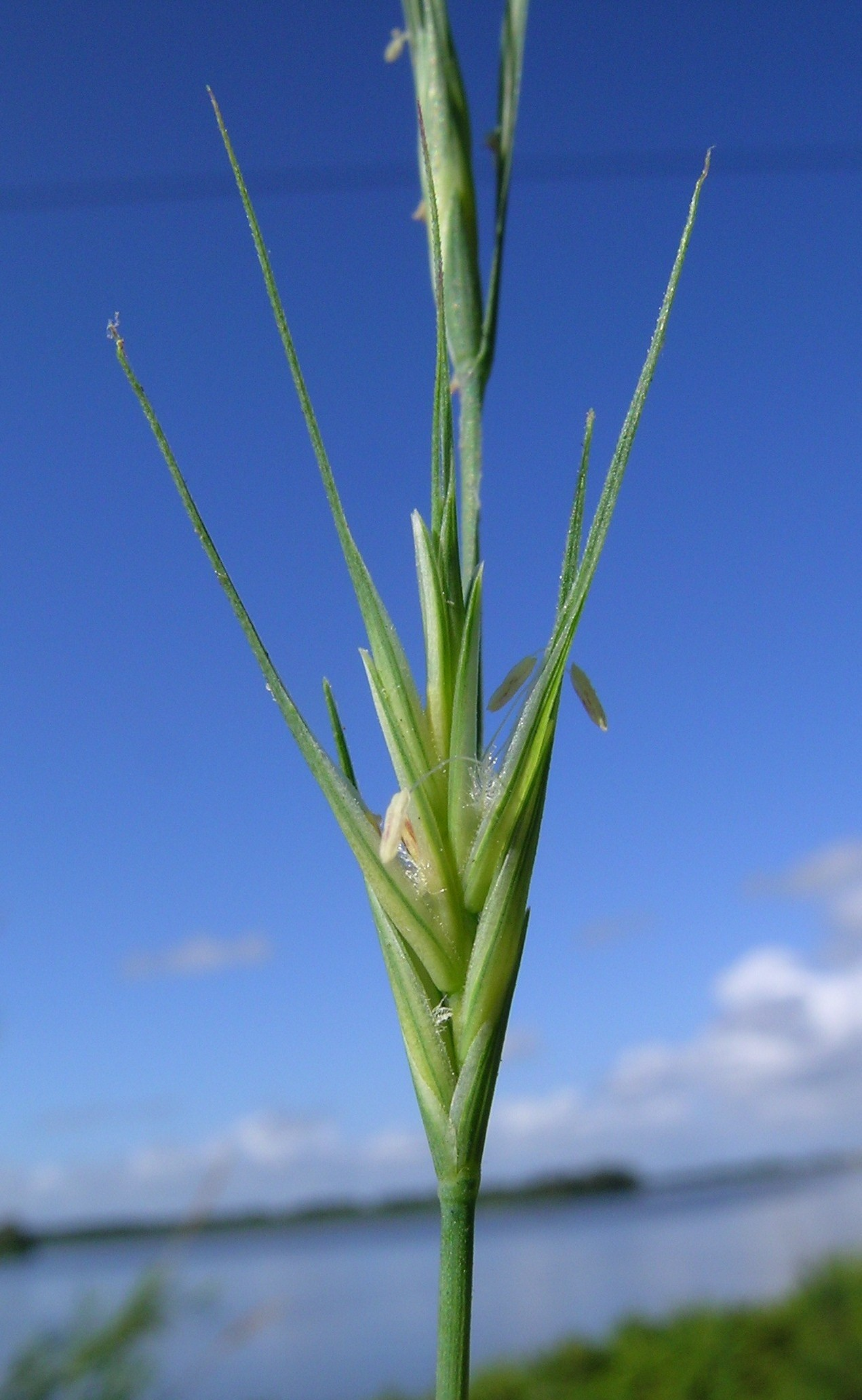
- Anthosachne kingiana (A. multiflora)

Scientific classification
- Kingdom: Plantae
- Clade: Tracheophytes
- Clade: Angiosperms
- Clade: Monocots
- Clade: Commelinids
- Order: Poales
- Family: Poaceae
- Subfamily: Pooideae
- Supertribe: Triticodae
- Tribe: Triticeae
- Genus: Anthosachne; Steud.

= Anthosachne =

Genus of grasses

Anthosachne is a genus of true grasses in the tribe Triticeae. It is primarily Australasian in its distribution, having five species native to New Zealand, 4 to Australia, and 1 to New Guinea. The Australian species are confined to the southern half of the continent.

Members of Anthosachne are non-rhizomatous, perennial grasses with spikelike inflorescences having one spikelet per node. They tend to differ from North American and Eurasian species of Elymus in having more slender stems, longer, usually curved awns, and glumes that are shorter in relation to the lemmas. They also differ in being hexaploids that combine the St, Y, and W genomes whereas Elymus consists of tetraploids and hexaploids that combine the St and H genomes. . The W genome is found only in Australasia, occurring also in the diploid genus Australopyrum.

Species in the genus include:

- Anthosachne aprica (Á.Löve & Connor) C.Yen & J.L.Yang (New Zealand)
- Anthosachne falcis (Connor) Barkworth & S.W.L.Jacobs (New Zealand)
- Anthosachne fertilis (S.Wang ex S.W.L.Jacobs & Barkworth) Barkworth & S.W.L.Jacobs (Australian)
- Anthosachne kingiana (Endl.) Govaerts (Australia and New Zealand)
- Anthosachne longiseta (Hitchc.) Barkworth & S.W.L.Jacobs (New Guinea)
- Anthosachne plurinervis (Vickery) Barkworth & S.W.L.Jacobs (Australia)
- Anthosachne rectiseta (Nees) Barkworth & S.W.L.Jacobs (Australia)
- Anthosachne sacandros (Connor) Barkworth & S.W.L. Jacobs (New Zealand)
- Anthosachne scabra (R.Br.) Nevski (Australia, introduced to New Zealand)
- Anthosachne solandri (Steud.) Barkworth & S.W.L.Jacobs (New Zealand)
