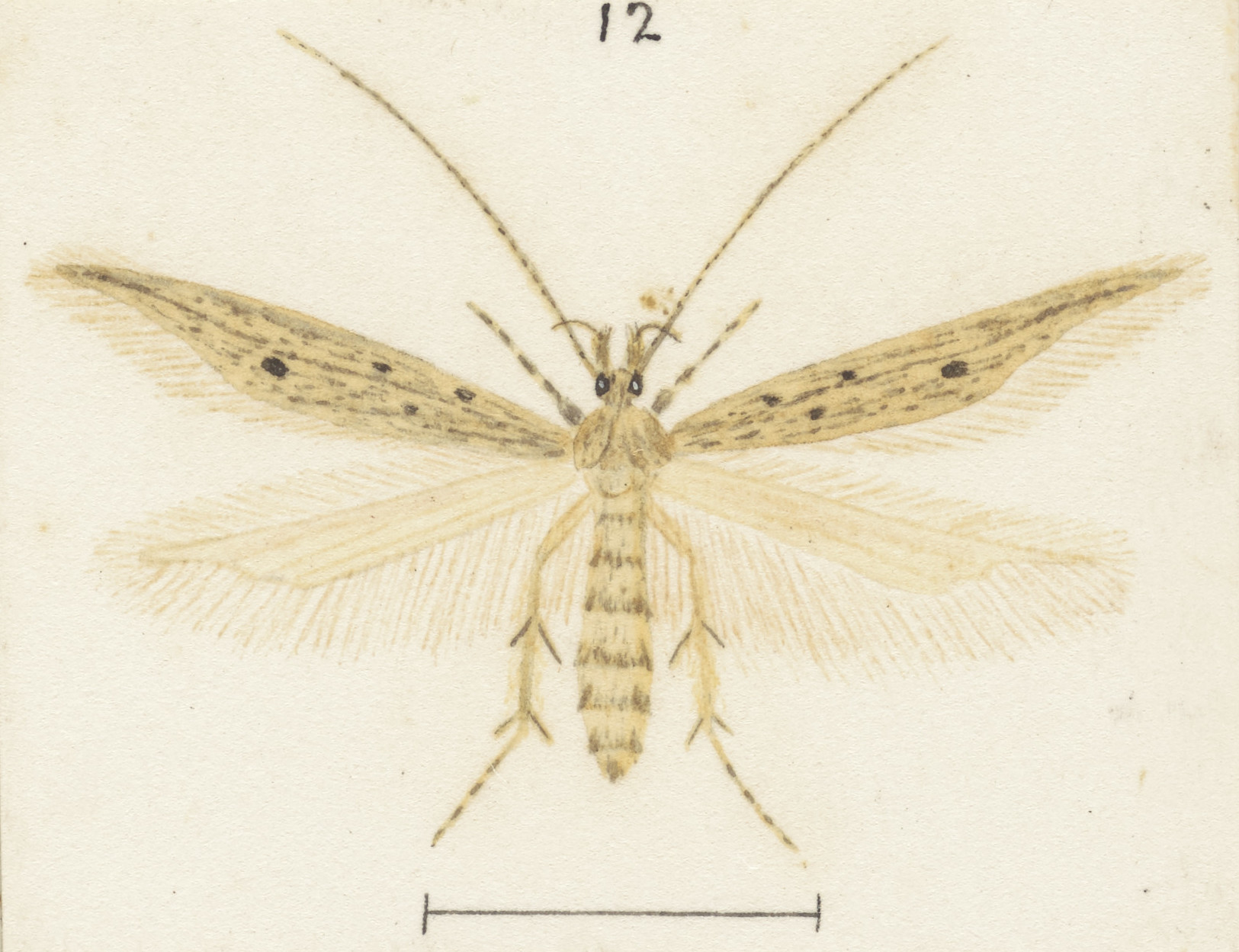
- Illustration of male
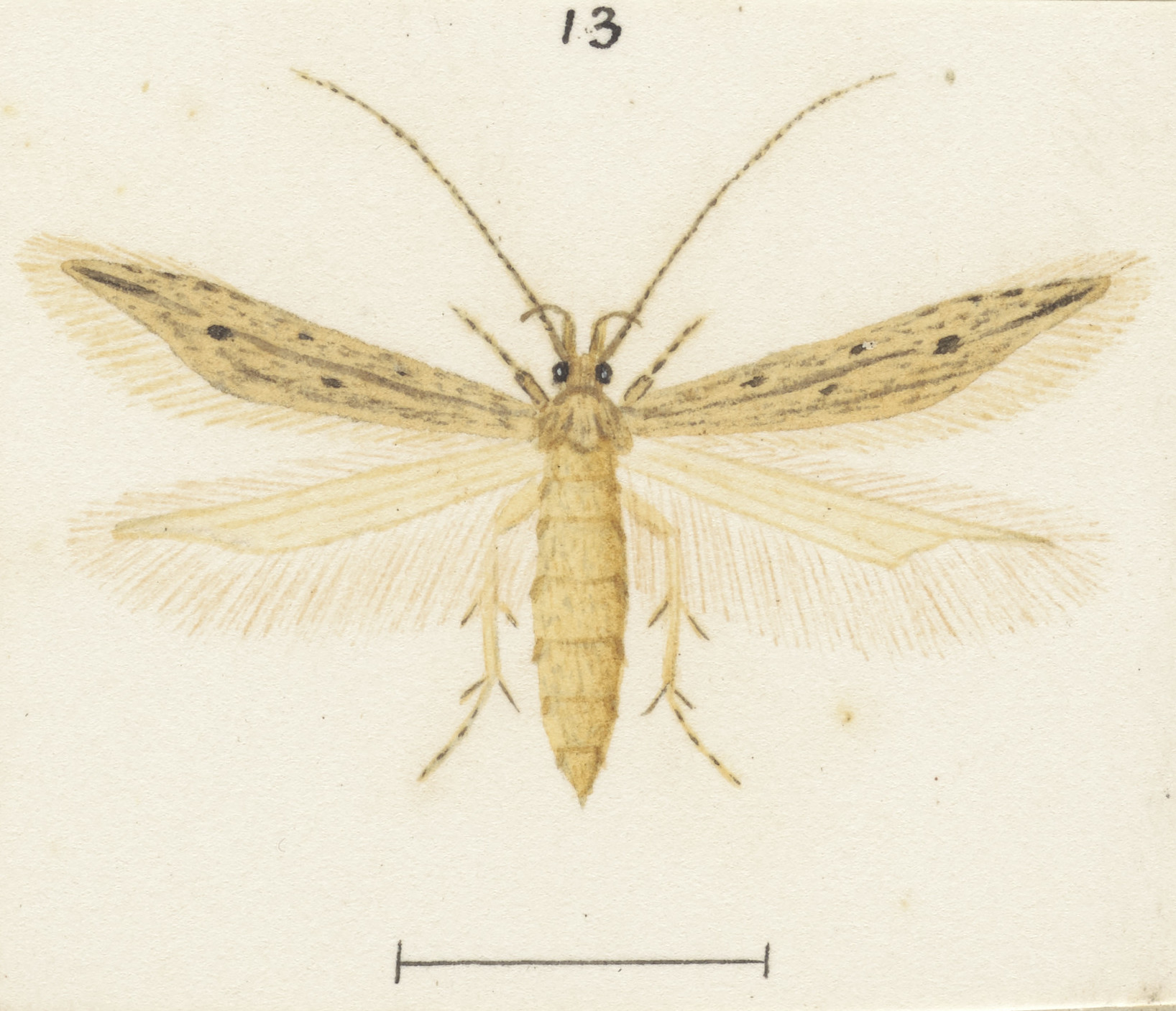
- Illustration of female

Scientific classification
- Kingdom: Animalia
- Phylum: Arthropoda
- Clade: Pancrustacea
- Class: Insecta
- Order: Lepidoptera
- Family: Gelechiidae
- Genus: Megacraspedus
- Species: M. calamogonus

Binomial name
- Megacraspedus calamogonus Meyrick, 1885

= Megacraspedus calamogonus =

Species of moth

Megacraspedus calamogonus is a moth of the family Gelechiidae. It was described by Edward Meyrick in 1885. It is endemic to New Zealand.

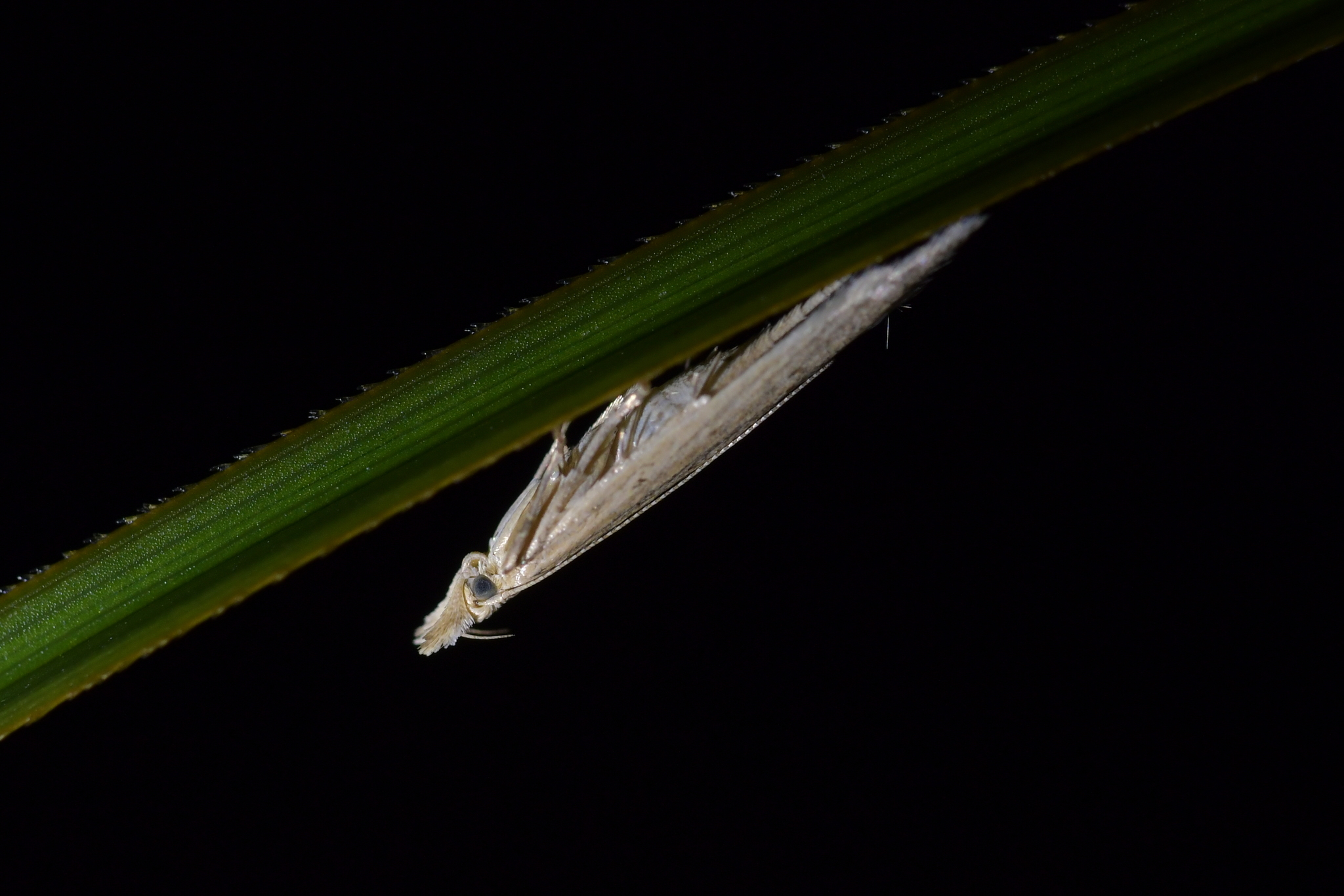
M. calamogonus at rest.

The wingspan is 10–16 mm (0.39–0.63 in). The forewings are whitish-ochreous, with the veins sometimes slightly infuscated. There is a dark fuscous dot in the disc slightly before the middle, a second very obliquely before it on the fold, and a third in the disc at two-thirds. There is also a short fuscous apical streak. The hindwings are whitish.

Larvae of this species feed on the flowers and seeds of grass and sedge plants. Hosts include Austroderia richardii, Chionochloa flavescens, Chionochloa macra, Chionochloa pallens, Chionochloa rigida and Chionochloa rubra.
