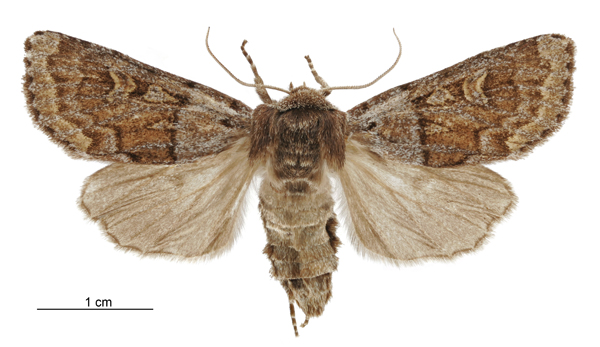
- Female
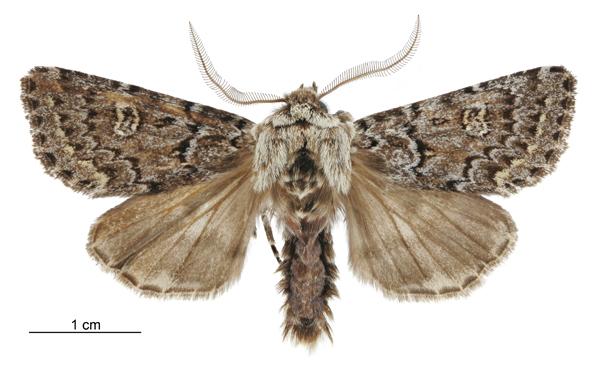
- Male

Scientific classification
- Kingdom: Animalia
- Phylum: Arthropoda
- Clade: Pancrustacea
- Class: Insecta
- Order: Lepidoptera
- Superfamily: Noctuoidea
- Family: Noctuidae
- Genus: Ichneutica
- Species: I. marmorata

Binomial name
- Ichneutica marmorata (Hudson, 1924)

Synonyms
- Persectania marmorata Hudson, 1924; Ichneutica dives Philpott, 1924

= Ichneutica marmorata =

Species of moth

Ichneutica marmorata is a moth of the family Noctuidae. This species is endemic to New Zealand and can be found in the North Island at the Tongariro National Park and at Puketitiri near the Kaweka Range. In the South Island it is widespread. It prefers alpine to subalpine habitat but occurs down to sea level altitudes in more southern locations. Adults are on the wing from late October to February. Larvae of this species may use tussock grasses in the genus Chionochloa as their host and they have been reared on Festuca novae-zelandiae.

== Taxonomy ==
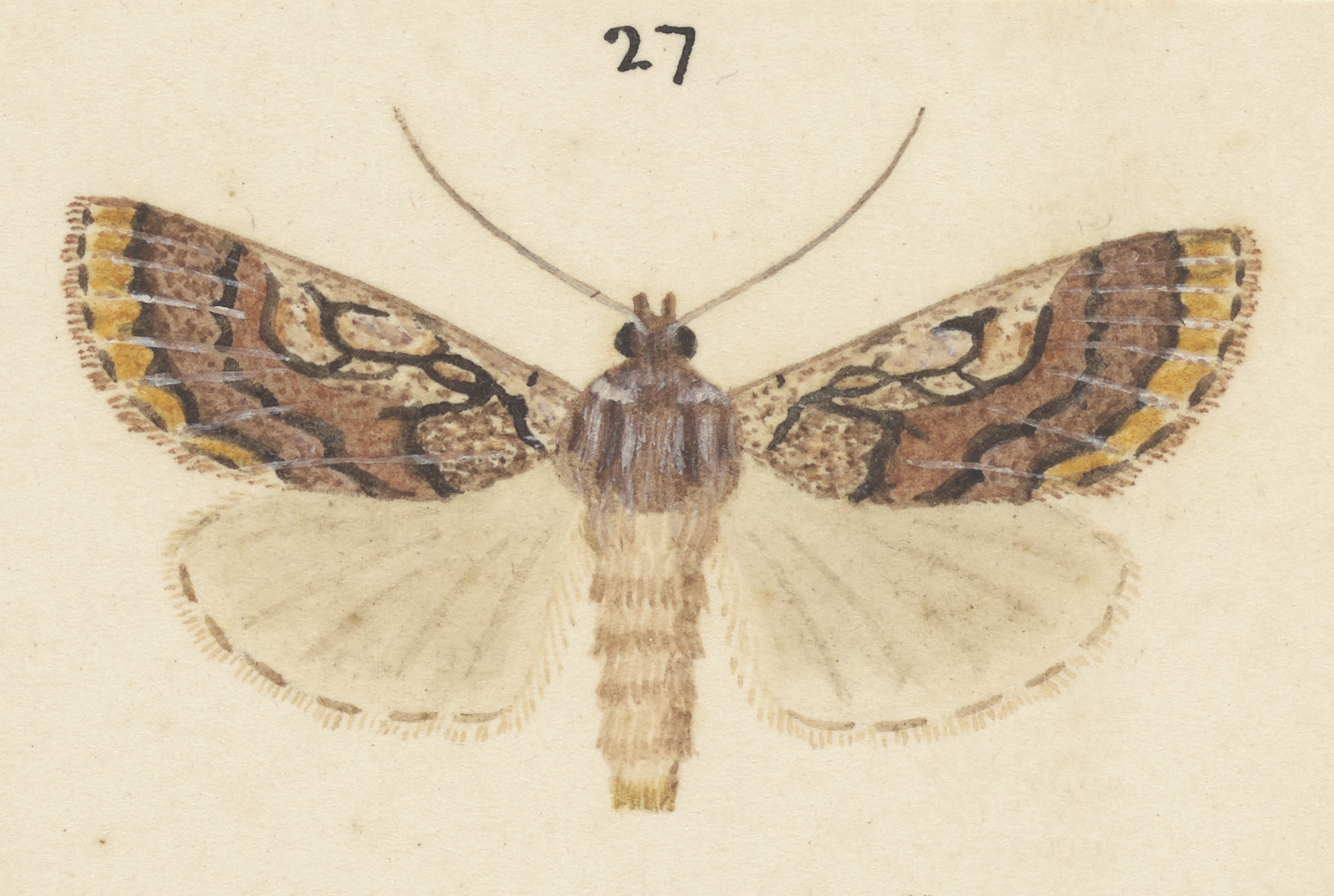
Illustration of I. marmorata by George Hudson.

This species was first described by George Hudson in 1924 using a single specimen collected by James Wishart Campbell at Arthur's Pass. Hudson originally named the species Persectania marmorata. The female holotype specimen is held at the Canterbury Museum. Later in 1924 Alfred Philpott also described this species and named it Ichneutica dives. In 1927 Philpott synonymised this name with I. marmorata. J. S. Dugdale discussed this species in his 1988 catalogue under the name I. marmorata. In 2019 Robert Hoare undertook a major review of New Zealand Noctuidae. During this review he confirmed that this species falls within the Ichneutica genus.

== Description ==
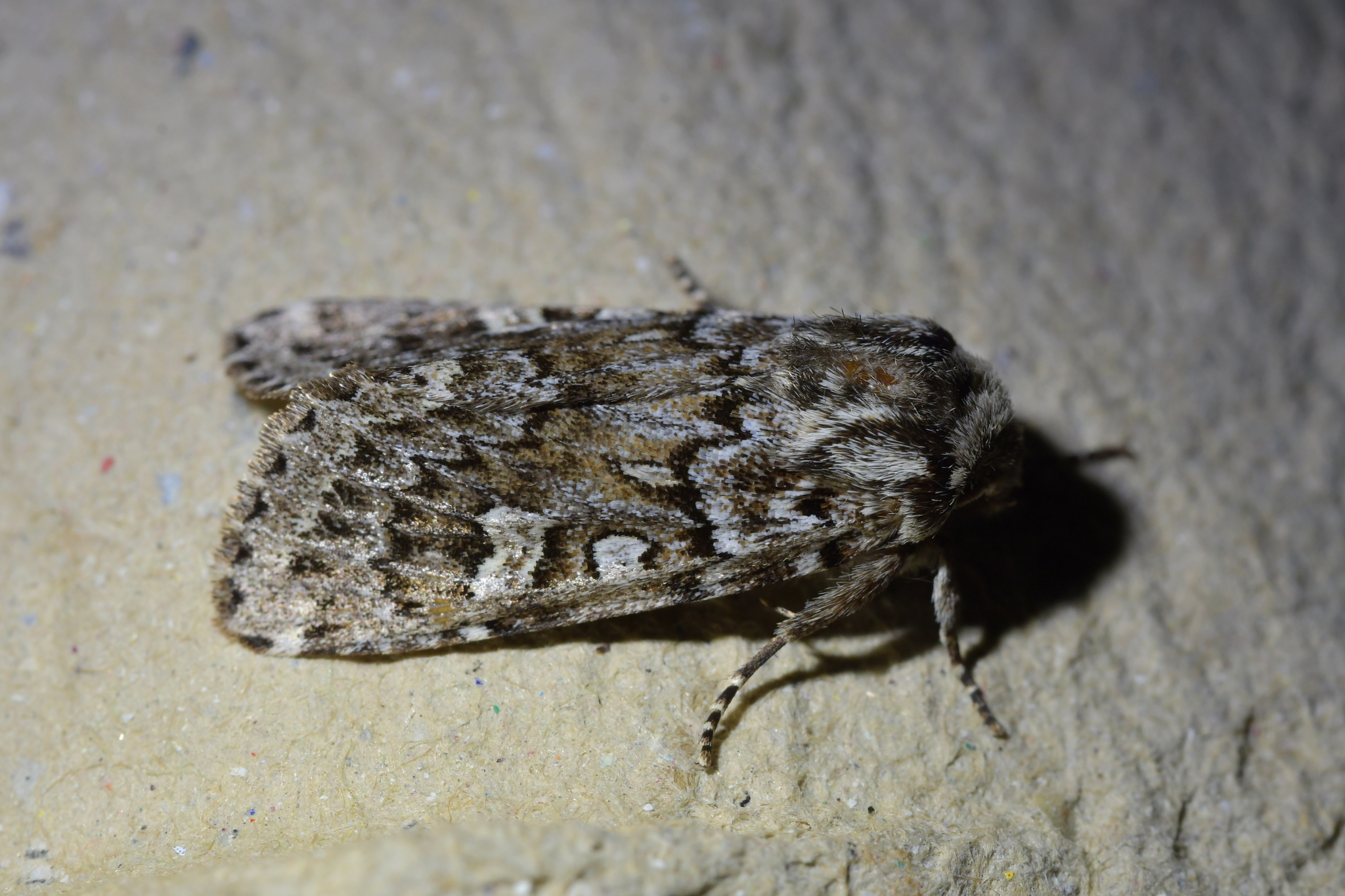
Ichneutica marmorata

Hudson describes the female adult of the species as follows:

The expansion of the wings of the female is 1 1/2. The fore-wings are rather narrow with the termen moderately oblique, very slightly scalloped; reddish grey; the lines and stigmata outlined in black; the stigmatic, basal and costal region (as far as the second line) heavily suffused with white; the basal line is indicated by two short bars, one on the costa, the other below the subcostal vein; first line interrupted, very strongly waved, from 1/4 of costa to 1/3 of dorsum; claviform obscure; orbicular small, very elongate, clearly outlined in black; a conspicuous, almost elliptical black marking between orbicular and reniform; reniform large, margined with black except towards costa and dorsum, white, with two small cloudy yellowish-brown marks within; second line strongly dentate, from 2/3 of costa to near middle of dorsum, a very deep oblique sinuation between veins 1 and 2; subterminal line moderately dentate; beyond subterminal line there is a conspicuous series of partly confluent ochreous spots; a terminal series of small blackish lunules; the cilia are red-brown. The hind-wings are very pale ochreous-grey, with a series of very faint terminal lunules; the cilia are almost white.

The pupa has large raised and wrinkled ridges on its dorsal side and has a long forked cremaster.

The male of the species has a wingspan of between 33 and 41 mm and the female has a wingspan of between 41 and 46 mm. The adults of I. marmorata are variable in appearance and may be confused with I. notata or I. chryserythra. I. marmorata can be distinguished from I. notata as the former has violet-reddish or grey coloured forewings where as I. notata has forewings that have a slight greenish shade. The male I. notata also has longer pectinations of the antenna. I. chryserythra can be distinguished from I. marmorata as it lacks the dark edging on the markings found on the forewing of I. marmorata specimens.

== Distribution ==
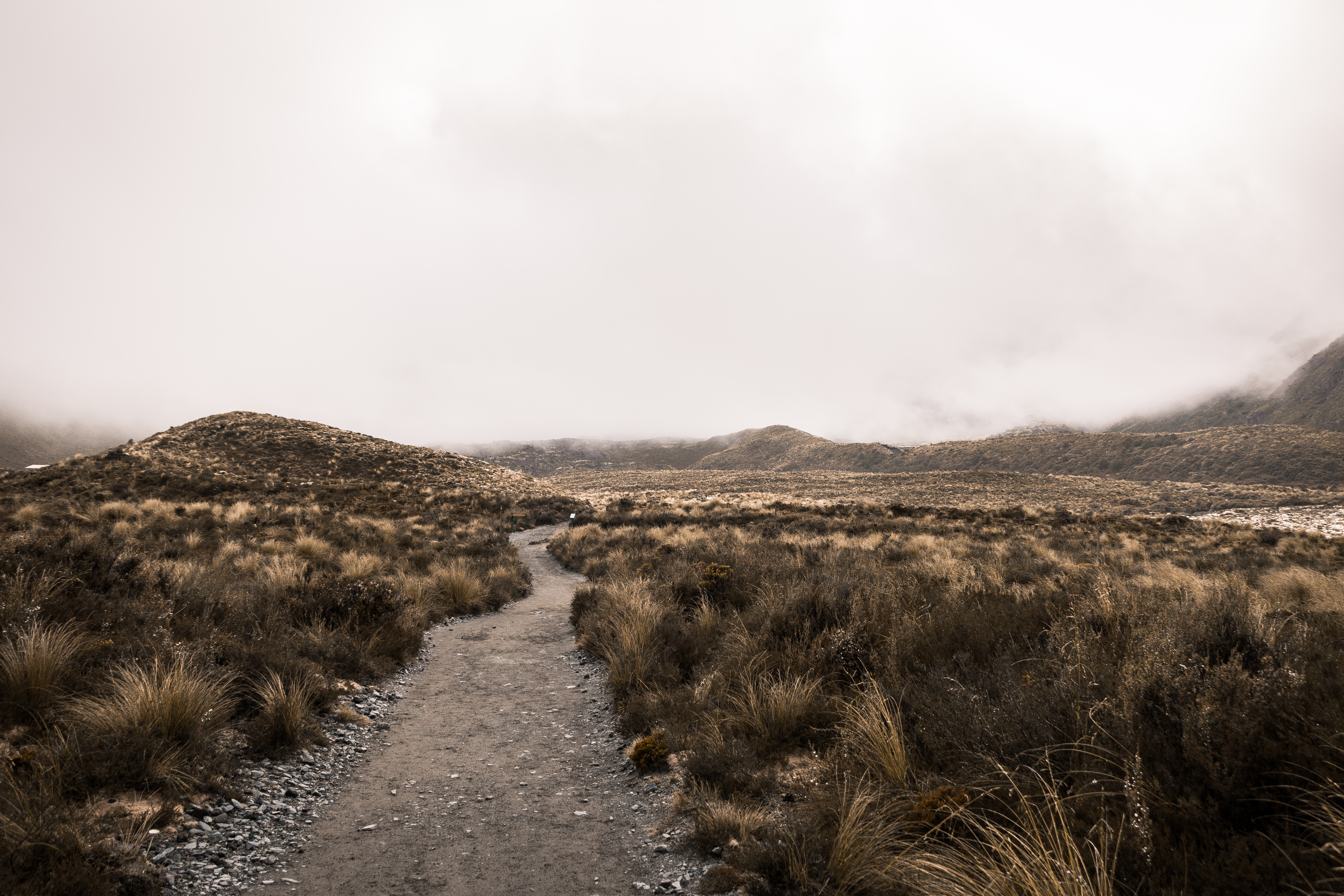
Tongariro National Park

This species is endemic to New Zealand. It has been observed in only two areas of the North Island, Tongariro National Park and at Puketitiri. In the South Island this species is widespread.

== Habitat ==
It prefers alpine to sub alpine habitats in its central North Island and northern South Island range but moving southwards down the country this moth can occur at lower altitudes including for example at sea level in Fiordland.

== Behaviour ==
Adults of this species are on the wing from late October to February, and are attracted to sugar traps.

== Life history and host species ==
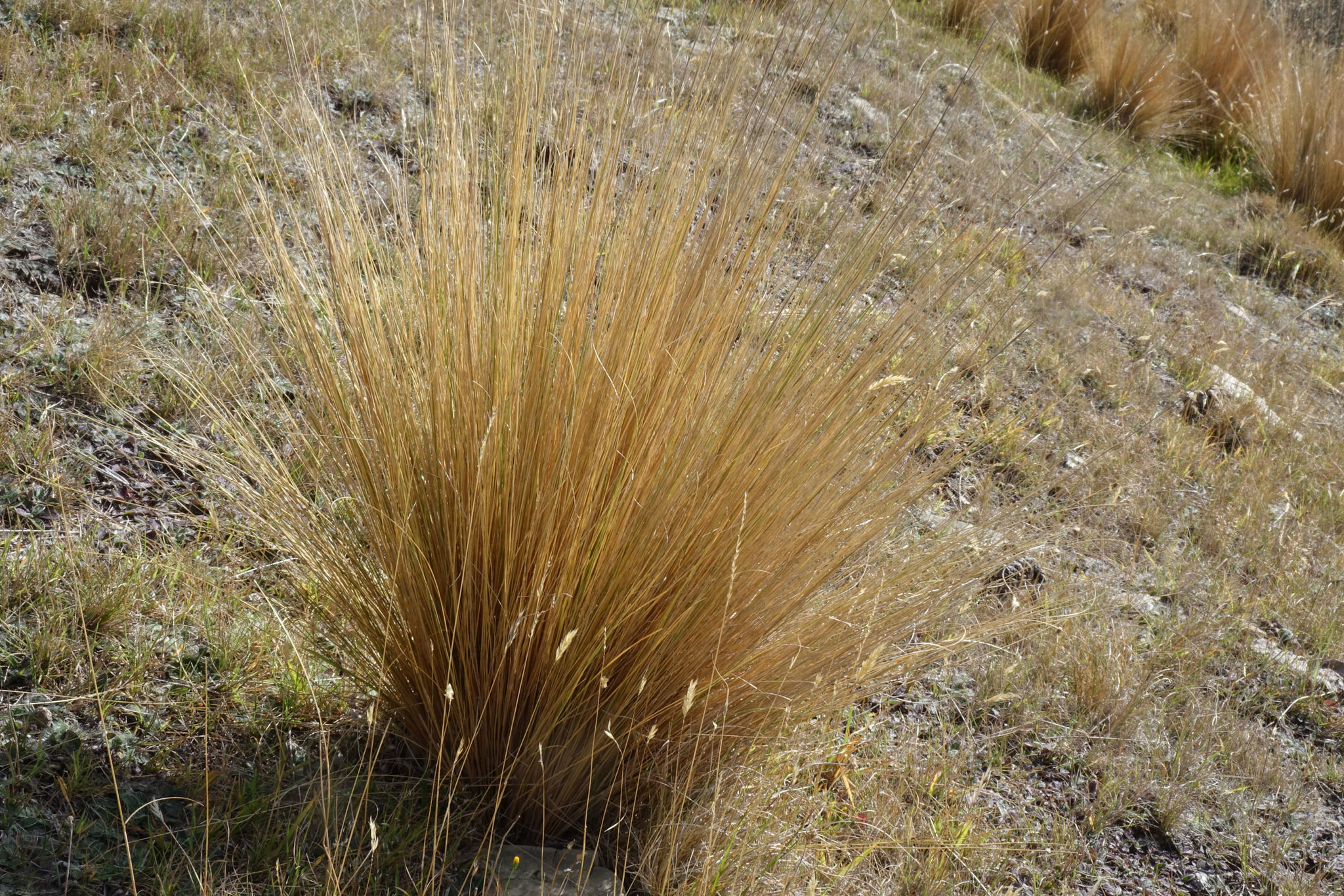
Festuca novae-zelandiae, I. marmorata larvae have been reared on this species

The information on the life history of this species is not definitive. A possible host of the larvae of this moth is tussock grass as the female of I. marmorata has been seen laying eggs on Chionochloa rubra subsp. cuprea. Larvae have been reared on Festuca novae-zelandiae.
