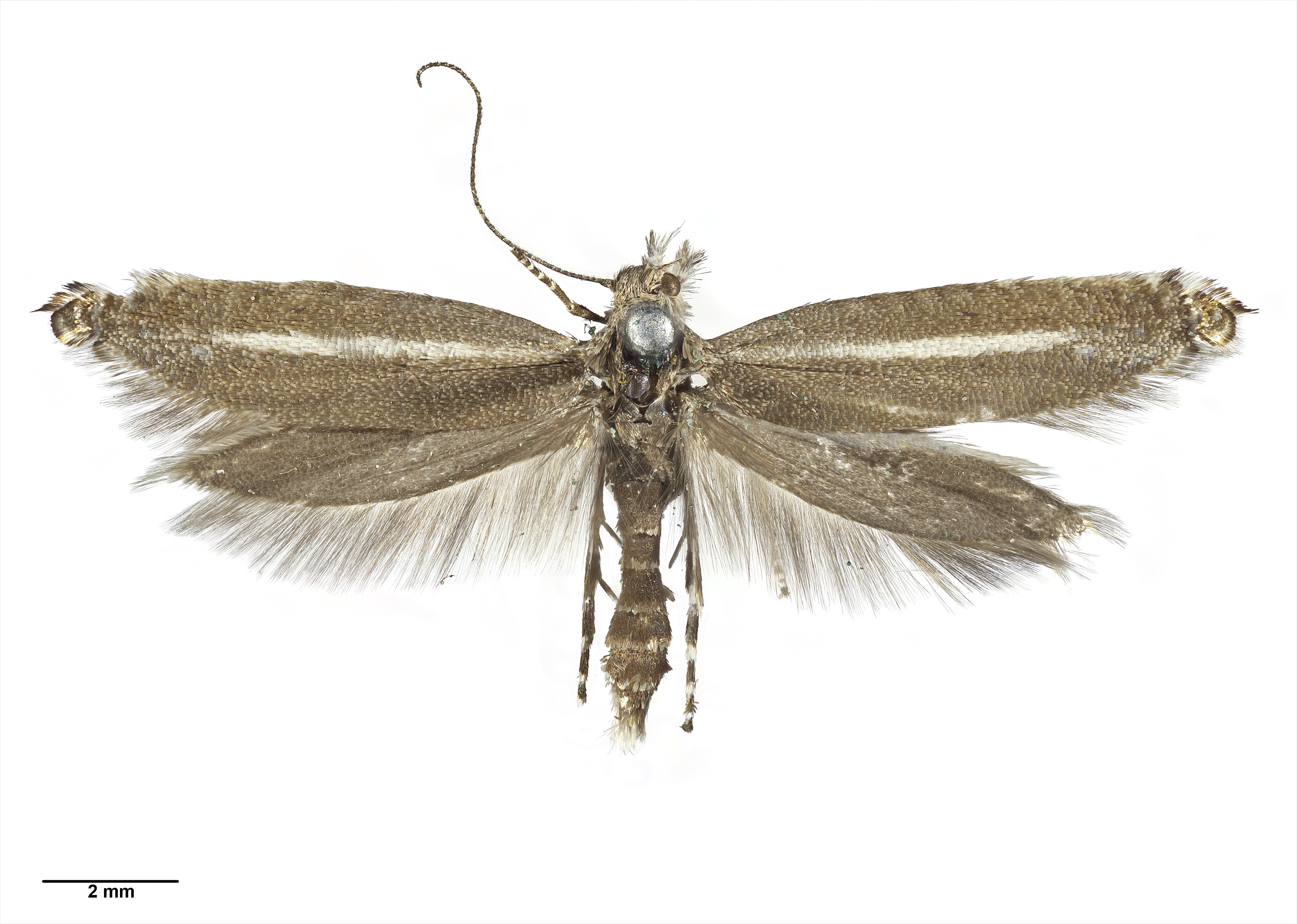
- Male holotype

Scientific classification
- Kingdom: Animalia
- Phylum: Arthropoda
- Clade: Pancrustacea
- Class: Insecta
- Order: Lepidoptera
- Family: Glyphipterigidae
- Genus: Glyphipterix
- Species: G. barbata

Binomial name
- Glyphipterix barbata Philpott, 1918

= Glyphipterix barbata =

Species of moth endemic to New Zealand

Glyphipterix barbata is a species of sedge moth in the genus Glyphipterix. It was first described by Alfred Philpott in 1918. G. barbata is endemic to New Zealand and occurs in the South Island. It frequents hilly tussock grassland above 1,000 feet (300 m). Larvae have been collected from a subspecies of Chionochloa rubra and reared to adulthood confirming that this plant is a larval host for this moth. Adults are commonly observed on the wing from November until January.

== Taxonomy ==
This species was first described by Alfred Philpott in 1918 using specimens collected by Charles E. Clarke at Waitati in November. In 1927 Philpott studied the male genitalia of this species. George Hudson discussed and illustrated this species under this name in his 1928 book The butterflies and moths of New Zealand. In 1988 John S. Dugdale confirmed the placement of this species within the genus Glyphipterix.The male holotype is held at the Auckland War Memorial Museum.

== Description ==
Illustration by Hudson.

Living specimen.

Philpott described this species as follows:

♂. 15-20 mm. Head and thorax fuscous-grey. Palpi fuscous-grey, second joint with dense rounded tuft of long hair. Antennae blackish. Abdomen fuscous-grey, segmental divisions and anal tuft paler. Legs fuscous-grey, tarsi annulated with fuscous and whitish. Forewings elongate-ovate, costa strongly arched, apex acutely projecting, termen extremely oblique; fuscous-grey with faint brassy sheen: a white median stripe from base to beneath apex, becoming obsolete towards extremities : apical 1/3 of costa more or less whitish with three or four dot-like strigae near apex : cilia fuscous-grey with obscure darker basal line. Hindwings fuscous-grey : cilia fuscous-whitish, paler round apex.

Philpott stated that this species is superficially similar to G. bactrias but that it can be distinguished as G. barbata has tufted palpi.

== Distribution ==
It is endemic to New Zealand. This species is common throughout the South Island. Hudson regarded G barbata as being a very local species.

== Habitat and hosts ==
Larval host Chionochloa rubra subsp. cuprea.

This species frequents hilly habitat above 1,000 feet (300 m) in altitude. It is associated with tussock grass. Larvae of this moth have been collected from a subspecies of Chionochloa rubra and reared to adulthood thus confirmed this plant as a larval host for this moth.

== Behaviour ==
Adults of this species are day flying and are commonly observed from November until January.
