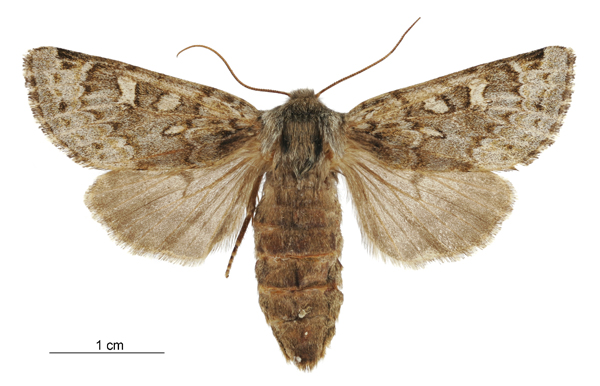
- female
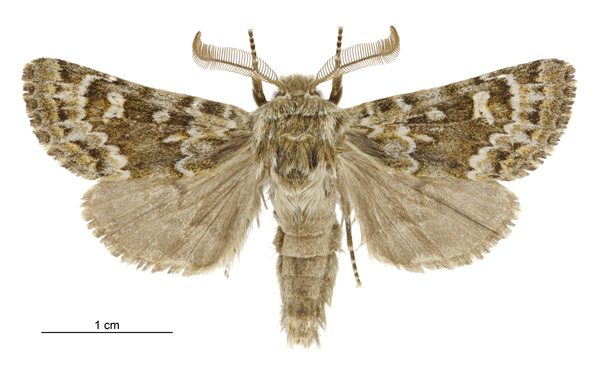
- male

Scientific classification
- Kingdom: Animalia
- Phylum: Arthropoda
- Clade: Pancrustacea
- Class: Insecta
- Order: Lepidoptera
- Superfamily: Noctuoidea
- Family: Noctuidae
- Genus: Ichneutica
- Species: I. notata

Binomial name
- Ichneutica notata Salmon, 1946

= Ichneutica notata =

Species of moth endemic to New Zealand

Ichneutica notata is a moth of the family Noctuidae. It is endemic to New Zealand. Although similar in appearance to other species in the Ichneutica genus, it can be distinguished by the colouration and patterns on its wings. It appears to be a very local species, rarely collected and having only been recorded in the north-west of the Tasman District, the Paproa Range, the Rainbow Ski field and the Craigieburn Range. Very little is known of the life history of I. notata.

== Taxonomy ==
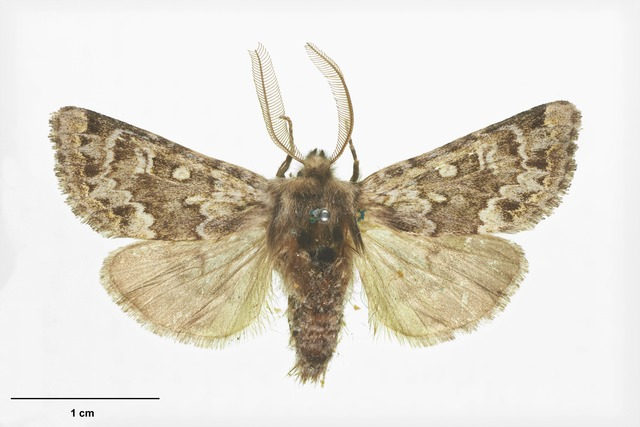
Male lectotype specimen of Ichneutica notata

This species was first described by John T. Salmon in 1946. Salmon described this species using two specimens, a male collected by Augustus Hamilton at Mount Peel, in the Tasman district in December 1910, and a female specimen Salmon himself had collected at Homer in Fiordland. The male specimen had been previously and incorrectly identified as Ichneutica lata. However, as Hoare points out, the female specimen used by Salmon is a specimen of I. marmorata. With no holotype specimen designated in the original paper by Salmon, Hoare designated the male specimen used by Salmon as the lectotype of this species. This specimen is held in the entomological collections at the Museum of New Zealand Te Papa Tongarewa.

== Description ==
The male lectotype specimen of I. notata was used by George Hudson in his 1928 book The butterflies and moths of New Zealand to describe and depict Ichneutic lata. He described the above specimen as follows:

The expansion of the wings of the male is about 1 5/8, ... The antennae of the male are dull orange-brown heavily bepectinated from base to apex. The forewings are dull greyish-green thickly speckled with blackish and ochreous scales, the central area being darker; the basal and first lines are broad, wavy, dull white, edged with blackish; the orbicular is rather small round white with a dusky central dot; the claviform very distinct also whitish; the reniform irregularly oblong, dull white with a dusky central line; the second line is very conspicuous, deeply indented between the veins white edged with blackish; there is a subterminal series of cloudy black spots, followed by a cloudy ochreous band, the cilia are dull greenish-grey barred with blackish. The hind-wings are dull greyish-brown with a cloudy discal lunual; the cilia are also greyish-brown with obscure darker bands.

This species can be distinguished from several species of similar appearance (such as I. eris and I. marmorata) as it has a slight green hue to its forewings. It can be distinguished from the similarly coloured I. cana specimens as these lack the pale elongated spot or mark on the forewings of I. notata. The male of I. notata has a wingspan of between 34 and 41 mm and the female has a wingspan of 47 mm.

== Distribution ==
I. notata is regarded as being restricted in its distribution and has only been found in the north-west portion of the Tasman District, in the Paparoa Range, in the Rainbow Ski Area, and in the Craigieburn Range.

== Habitat ==
I. notata prefers hilly alpine habitat.

== Life history ==
Little is known about the life history of this species. However pupae have been collected in short grass and pupae have also been reared in bare soil.

== Behaviour ==
The adults of the species are on the wing from late November to early January.
