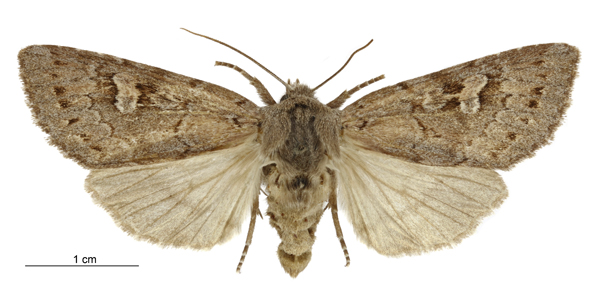
- Female
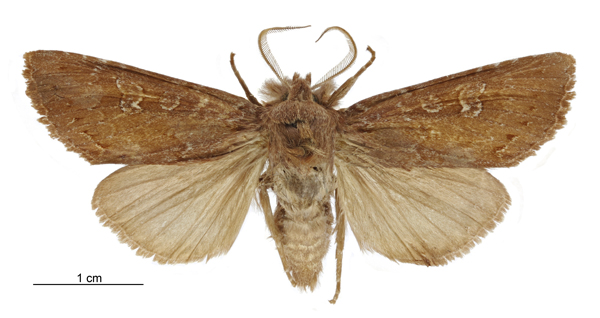
- Male

Scientific classification
- Kingdom: Animalia
- Phylum: Arthropoda
- Clade: Pancrustacea
- Class: Insecta
- Order: Lepidoptera
- Superfamily: Noctuoidea
- Family: Noctuidae
- Genus: Ichneutica
- Species: I. chryserythra

Binomial name
- Ichneutica chryserythra (Hampson, 1905)

Synonyms
- Morrisonia chryserythra Hampson, 1905; Graphania chryserythra (Hampson, 1905)

= Ichneutica chryserythra =

Species of moth

Ichneutica chryserythra is a moth of the family Noctuidae. Living specimens have distinctive violet red coloured forewings but can be distinguished from the similar species Ichneutica marmorata as it lacks the dark edge markings of the later species. I. chryserythra can only be found in the southern parts of the South Island. Adults are on the wing between November and January. The life history of the species and the host species of its larvae are unknown.

== Taxonomy ==
This species was first described by George Hampson from both a male and a female specimen and named Morrisonia chryserythra. The male type specimen was collected in Orepuki by Mr Dunlop and is now held at the Natural History Museum, London. The female specimen is said to be in the Dunlop Collection.

In his 1988 catalogue, J. S. Dugale stated that this species was within the Graphania genus. In 2019 Robert Hoare undertook a major review of New Zealand Noctuidae species. During this review the genus Ichneutica was greatly expanded and the genus Graphania was subsumed into that genus as a synonym. As a result of this review, this species is now known as Ichneutica hartii.

== Description ==
Hampson described the species as follows:

♀. Antennae minutely serrate; head and thorax bright ferruginous red mixed with ochreous; abdomen ochreous, suffused with ferruginous. Fore wing ochreous, almost entirely suffused with bright ferruginous red; subbasal line whitish, angled outwards in submedian fold and ending at vein 1; antemedial line double, filled in with whitish, oblique, angled inwards on median nervure and vein 1; claviform with its extremity defined by whitish; orbicular and reniform large, with whitish annuli, the former rather oblique, elliptical, open above, the latter incomplete below; post-medial line defined by whitish on outer side, minutely dentate, strongly bent outwards below costa and oblique below vein 4; subterminal line minutely dentate, angled outwards at vein 7, dentate to termen at veins 4, 3, and bent outwards to tornus. Hind wing ferruginous red; the underside paler, with ferruginous spot and traces of curved postmedial line. ♂. Head and thorax purplish red; abdomen suffused with red; fore wing purplish red, the markings all indistinct; hind wing pale reddish.

This moth is distinctive, with a violet red hue to the forewings in living specimens. The male has a wingspan of between 40 and 43 mm and the female of between 48 and 49 mm. This species has darker forms and may be confused with I. marmorata however the later species has forewings that are edged with dark markings. The appearance of this moth tends to fade to tawny as specimens age.

== Distribution ==
It is endemic to New Zealand and can only be found in the southern parts of the South Island.

== Habitat ==
This species can be found in copper tussock grassland as well as in podocarp forests. It has been collected in open habitats as well as dense forest in the Catlins, often at higher altitudes but can occur at lower altitudes, including down to sea level at its type locality. It appears to be absent from dryer localities.

== Behaviour ==
Adults of this species are on the wing from November to January.

== Life history and host species ==
The life history of this species is unknown as are the host species of its larvae. It is possible that the larvae of this species is a monocot feeder and it has been hypothesised that the larvae consume Chionochloa rubra cuprea. However, as the species is also found in podocarp forest the host species of the larvae may include other plant species.
