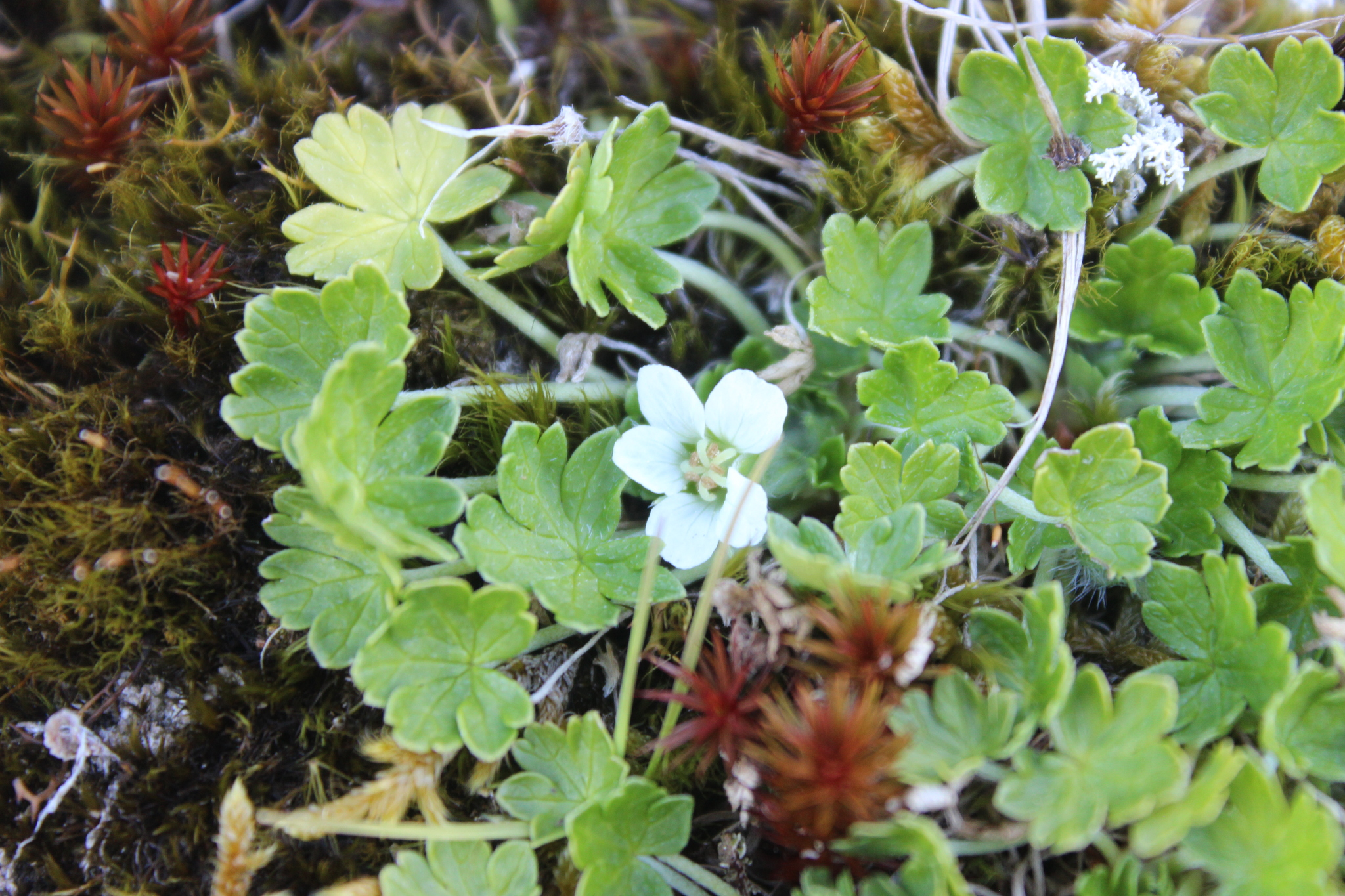
- Geranium brevicaule in Ōwhiro Bay, Wellington

Conservation status
- Not Threatened (NZ TCS)

Scientific classification
- Kingdom: Plantae
- Clade: Tracheophytes
- Clade: Angiosperms
- Clade: Eudicots
- Clade: Rosids
- Order: Geraniales
- Family: Geraniaceae
- Genus: Geranium
- Species: G. brevicaule

Binomial name
- Geranium brevicaule Hook.f.

= Geranium brevicaule =

Species of plant

Geranium brevicaule is a species of flowering plant, indigenous to New Zealand and Australia.

== Description ==
This plant is a low lying plant with short stems (hence the name brevicaule), and has red, pink, or white flowers. It is a perennial vascular plant.

Easily recognised from other indigenous and naturalised Geranium species in NZ by its small, compact, growth habit, stout taproot, persistent basal leaves, very short flowering stems (mostly shorter than basal leaves) and its smooth seeds.

== Range ==
This species is known from the main islands of New Zealand, south of Auckland, as well as Stewart Island. It can be found in southeast Australia and Tasmania.

== Habitat ==
Found from the coast to the subalpine areas at around 1200m. This species can be found in open ground, tussock grassland, penalpine areas, and near water in rocky areas and river flats.

== Ecology ==
The species flowers and fruits year-round, but the flowers are wind dispersed and not through animal consumption.

Geranium brevicaule may not be able to recolonize disturbed areas easily after disturbance by wombats.

== Taxonomy ==
This species was described by Joseph Dalton Hooker in 1834. Several subspecies of Geranium sessiflorum are considered synonyms.
