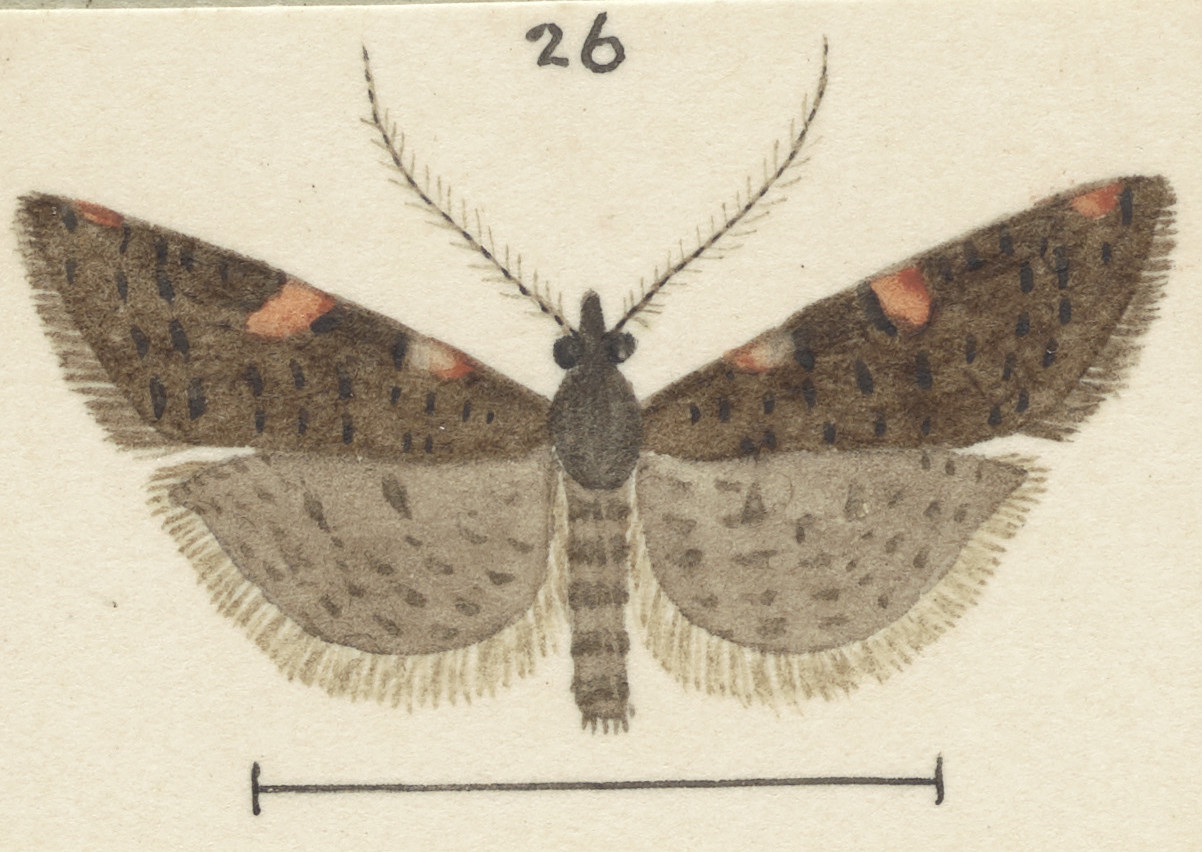

Conservation status
- Nationally Endangered (NZ TCS)

Scientific classification
- Kingdom: Animalia
- Phylum: Arthropoda
- Class: Insecta
- Order: Lepidoptera
- Family: Tortricidae
- Genus: Cnephasia
- Species: C. paterna

Binomial name
- Cnephasia paterna Philpott, 1926

= Cnephasia paterna =

Species of moth

Cnephasia paterna is a species of moth in the family Tortricidae. It is endemic to New Zealand. This species is classified as Nationally Endangered by the Department of Conservation.

== Taxonomy ==
C. paterna was described by Alfred Philpott in 1926 using a male specimen collected by Stuart Lindsay on the 31 March 1923. George Vernon Hudson illustrated the type specimen of the moth in his 1928 publication The Butterflies and Moths of New Zealand. Although the type locality given by Philpott is Little River, evidence suggests that this locality is incorrect. The genus level classification of New Zealand endemic moths within the genus Cnephasia is regarded as unsatisfactory and is under revision. As such the species is currently also known as Cnephasia (s.l.) paterna. The type specimen is held at Canterbury Museum.

== Description ==
Philpott described the species as follows:

21 mm. Head and palpi fuscous mingled with reddish. Antennae dark fuscous, annulated with whitish, swollen at joints, ciliations 3 1/2. Thorax leaden-fuscous. Abdomen greyish-fuscous. Legs ochreous-white mixed with fuscous, anterior pair fuscous, tarsi narrowly annulated with white. Forewings elongate-triangular, costa slightly arched at base, thence straight, apex round-pointed, termen straight, strongly oblique; leaden fuscous, densely strigulated with blackish and with scattered reddish scales; costal fold small, about 1/7; a strong outwardly-oblique fascia from costa at apex of fold, yellow mixed with red; a similarly-coloured fascia, preceded by numerous red scales, from costa before middle, outwardly oblique, parallel-sided, reaching about 1/3 across wing; a yellow-and-red spot on costa before apex; some indefinite white marks on apical area: fringes grey with a reddish basal line. Hindwings grey strigulated with fuscous: fringes whitish-grey.

== Distribution ==
This species is endemic to New Zealand and has only been found in the South Island. The type specimen remained unique until the species was rediscovered by Brian Patrick on the 28 May 2012 at Saddle Hill, Banks Peninsula. This locality remains the only site where this species has been found.

== Habitat ==
The rediscovery of the species occurred on south-eastern slopes at an altitude of 750-800m amongst the snow tussock Chionochloa rigida.

== Life history and biology ==
Much information on biology and life cycle of this moth is yet to be discovered and the species has not yet been reared. Patrick hypothesises that the larvae of this species feed in silken tunnels and that they have an annual life-cycle. Adults emerge in the late autumn or early winter. Hudson records the insect being collectable at the end of March. The female of this species is short wings and flightless, which inhibits the dispersal of the species. The male of the species are active during the day and are regarded as fast flyers.

== Conservation status ==
This species has been classified under the New Zealand Threat Classification system as being Nationally Endangered.
