= Chionochloa howensis =

Scientific classification
- Kingdom: Plantae
- Clade: Embryophytes
- Clade: Tracheophytes
- Clade: Angiosperms
- Clade: Monocots
- Clade: Commelinids
- Order: Poales
- Family: Poaceae
- Genus: Chionochloa
- Species: C. howensis

Binomial name
- Chionochloa howensis Jacobs (1988)

Species of grass

Chionochloa howensis is a species of grass in the family Poaceae. The specific epithet derives from the name of the island to which it is endemic. The species was first discovered by John Pickard in 1970. Its affinities lie with Chionochloa flavicans of New Zealand and not with Australian species of Chionochloa.

== Description ==
It is an erect perennial grass, growing to about 1 metre (3 feet 3 inches) in height. The leaf blade is 60 cm (24 in) or more long and 12 mm wide; it is flat, strongly ribbed, and scabrous on the upper surface.

== Distribution and habitat ==
The grass is endemic to Australia’s subtropical Lord Howe Island in the Tasman Sea; it is known only from the cliffs of Mounts Lidgbird and Gower at the southern end of the island.
