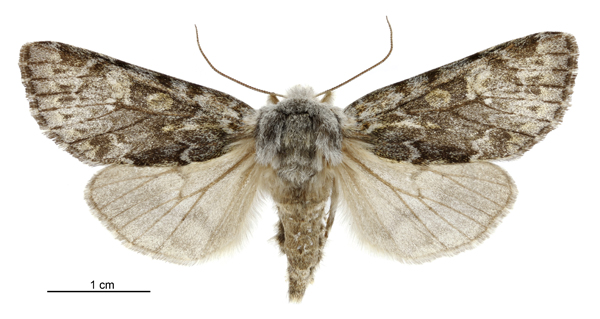
- Female
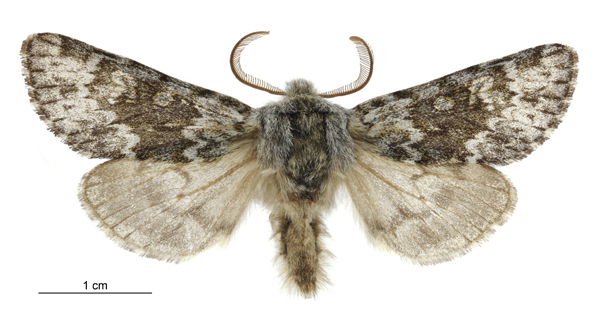
- Male

Scientific classification
- Kingdom: Animalia
- Phylum: Arthropoda
- Clade: Pancrustacea
- Class: Insecta
- Order: Lepidoptera
- Superfamily: Noctuoidea
- Family: Noctuidae
- Genus: Ichneutica
- Species: I. cana

Binomial name
- Ichneutica cana Howes, 1914

Synonyms
- Aletia empyrea Hudson, 1918; Ichneutica homerica Howes, 1943; Ichneutica empyrea (Hudson, 1918)

= Ichneutica cana =

Species of moth, endemic to New Zealand

Ichneutica cana is a moth of the family Noctuidae. It is endemic to New Zealand.

== Taxonomy ==
I. cana was first described by George Howes in 1914 from a single male specimen collected in the Garvie Mountains, near Lake Wakatipu in Otago. This species was illustrated and discussed in George Hudson's 1928 book The Butterflies and Moths of New Zealand. John S. Dugdale agreed with the placement of this species within the genus Ichneutica in 1988. Robert J. B. Hoare also confirmed the placement of this species within the genus Ichneutica in his major review of New Zealand Noctuidae species in 2019.

== Description ==
Howes originally described the species as follows:

Face grey. Palpi blackish at base. Head and thorax grey, frontal area lighter grey. Head and thorax densely clothed with long dark-grey hair. Thorax broad in proportion to length, with a slight posterior crest. Abdomen grey. Forewings grey, with pale grey lines and occasional darker marks. A single light-grey line at base; a jagged grey line about 1/5, strongly dentate near dorsum; outwardly suffused with dark grey. Orbicular faintly shown in light grey, and separated from reniform by a distinct dark-grey patch. Reniform faintly outlined in light grey. A jagged light-grey line at 3/4, bending towards termen until centre of wing, then inwards before reaching dorsum. Terminal edge margined with light grey, edged basally with a dark suffusion, which forms a faintly defined line; slight grey marks along veins where they reach termen. Cilia short, light grey and dark grey alternate patches. Hindwings light grey with a faint ochreous tinge, a darker band across wing at J and a slightly waved subterminal band. Terminal edge and cilia grey-white. Underside grey with a faint ochreous tinge and a well-defined irregular dark-grey line at about 3/4 across both wings.

I. cana is similar in appearance to I. eris but there are visual differences between the two species.

== Geographic range ==
This species is found only in the South Island, in the eastern and southern parts of that Island as well as in Fiordland. Unlike I. eris, I. cana does not appear to be present in the north-west of the South Island.

== Habitat ==
I. cana can be found in alpine habitat.

== Life history and host species ==
The life history of this species is unknown as are the host species of its larvae.

== Behaviour ==
The adults of this species are on the wing during December and January. The males of this species are on the wing during sunny days, and both sexes are attracted to light.
