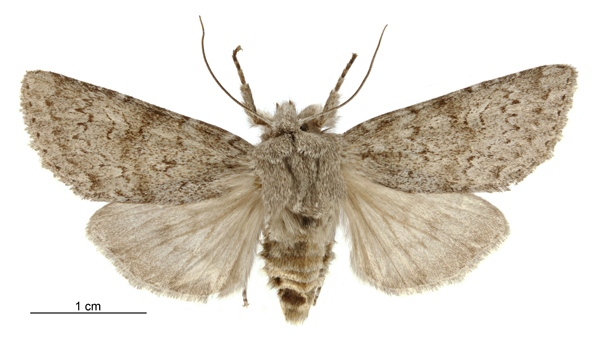
- Female
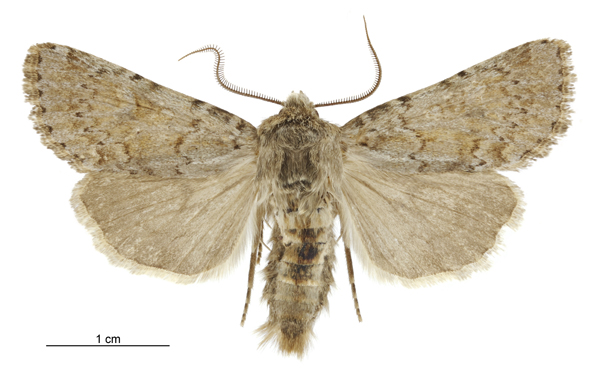
- Male

Conservation status
- Data Deficit (NZ TCS)

Scientific classification
- Kingdom: Animalia
- Phylum: Arthropoda
- Clade: Pancrustacea
- Class: Insecta
- Order: Lepidoptera
- Superfamily: Noctuoidea
- Family: Noctuidae
- Genus: Ichneutica
- Species: I. fibriata

Binomial name
- Ichneutica fibriata (Meyrick, 1913)

Synonyms
- Aletia fibrata Meyrick, 1914; Graphania fibrata (Meyrick, 1913); Mythimna fibriata (Meyrick, 1913); Aletia fibriata Meyrick, 1913; Aletia (?) lata Philpott, 1915

= Ichneutica fibriata =

Species of moth

Ichneutica fibriata is a moth in the family Noctuidae. It is endemic to New Zealand. This species was first described by Edward Meyrick in 1913 using specimens collected by Frederick Giles Gibbs. I. fibriata is similar in appearance to other species in the Ichneutica genus particularly I. eris but can be distinguished due to its larger size and more uniform light grey colour. I. fibriata also has a similar coloured thorax and head where as these two anatomical features may differ in colour shade in I. eris. Adults frequent alpine areas and are on the wing in November to January. The life history and the host species of the larvae of this species is unknown. In 2025 this species was classified as "data deficient" under the New Zealand Threat Classification System.

== Taxonomy ==
This species was first described by Edward Meyrick in 1913 from two specimens collected by Frederick Giles Gibbs and named Aletia fibriata. The male lectotype specimen is held at the Natural History Museum, London. Meyrick in an article published in 1914 stated that the original name was misprinted as Aletia fibriata and the correct spelling was Aletia fibrata. George Hudson, in The Moths and Butterflies of New Zealand, used the species name Alentia fibrata when discussing the species, however more recent publications use the original name of Alentia fibriata.

Prior to 2019, the genus level classification of New Zealand endemic moths within the genus Aletia was regarded as unsatisfactory and was due for revision. As such the species has also been known as Aletia (s.l.) fibriata. In 2019 Robert Hoare undertook a major review of New Zealand Noctuidae. During this review the genus Ichneutica was greatly expanded and the genus Aletia was subsumed into that genus as a synonym. As a result of this review, this species is now known as Ichneutica fibriata.

== Description ==
Meyrick described the species as having a 44-46mm wingspan. Hudson described the species as follows:

The fore-wings are pale grey speckled with darker grey, with blackish markings; there is an interrupted dentate basal line; the first line and stigmata are faintly indicated; the second line is very fine, strongly dentate, inwards-curved near the dorsum with the tips of the dentations marked by whitish-edged black points; there is a series blackish terminal dots; the cilia are grey, faintly barred with darker grey. The hind-wings are ochreous-grey. The antennae of the male are strongly bipectinated.

This species can be distinguished from similar species by its more uniform slightly grey colour and larger size. The male of the species has a wingspan of between 38 and 46 mm and the female of between 46 and 48.5 mm. It is most similar in appearance to I. eris but is different in that I. fibriata has a similar coloured head and thorax in comparison to I. eris which has a distinctively pale frons.

== Distribution ==
I. fibriata is rarely collected but has been found on the eastern side of the South Island. There is one record of this species being collected in the Paparoa Range on the West Coast. Specimens have also been collected at Mount Richmond, near Nelson, at Hanmer Springs and there has been one recorded occurrence in the Otago Lakes area.

== Habitat ==
This species frequents alpine areas.

== Behaviour ==
I. fibriata adults are on the wing in November to January.

== Life history and host species ==
The life history of this species is unknown as are the host species of its larvae.

== Conservation status ==
In 2025 this species was classified by the New Zealand Department of Conservation as "data deficient" under the New Zealand Threat Classification System. Data on this species is poor as the species is difficult to identify.
