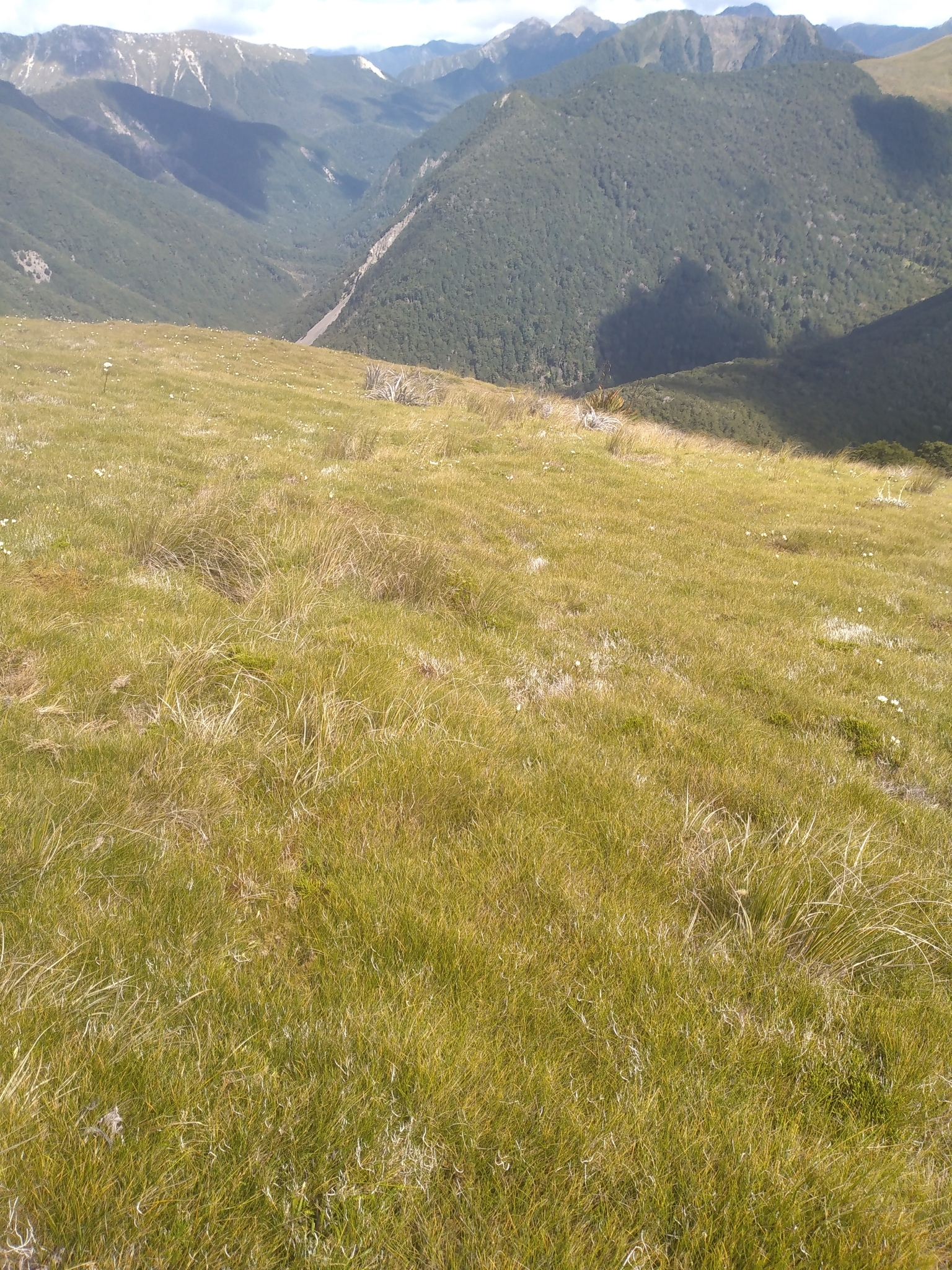
- Chionochloa australis in Kahurangi National Park

Conservation status
- Not Threatened (NZ TCS)

Scientific classification
- Kingdom: Plantae
- Clade: Tracheophytes
- Clade: Angiosperms
- Clade: Monocots
- Clade: Commelinids
- Order: Poales
- Family: Poaceae
- Genus: Chionochloa
- Species: C. australis

Binomial name
- Chionochloa australis (Buchanan) Zotov

= Chionochloa australis =

Species of flowering plants

Chionochloa australis, or carpet grass, is a species of grass, endemic to New Zealand. It is known as haumata or wī kura in Māori.

== Description ==
Chionochloa australis grows in wide mats of grass in montane areas. The leaves are short and densely packed, although the culms are as long as 400mm. Around four spikelets, of up to 8 purple florets, grow on long branchlets.

They are "distinctive in the presence of adaxial sheath hairs, projecting leaf-blade hairs, and hanks of hairs at sheath apex."

The grass is perennial.

== Distribution and habitat ==
Chionochloa australis is known only from the South Island, where it grows in montane areas in herbfields and grasslands from Nelson to Canterbury.

There are some records from Fiordland and Campbell Island which may not be verified.

== Etymology ==
australis means 'southern' in Latin.

== Taxonomy ==
The lectotype is from the Kaikōura mountains.
