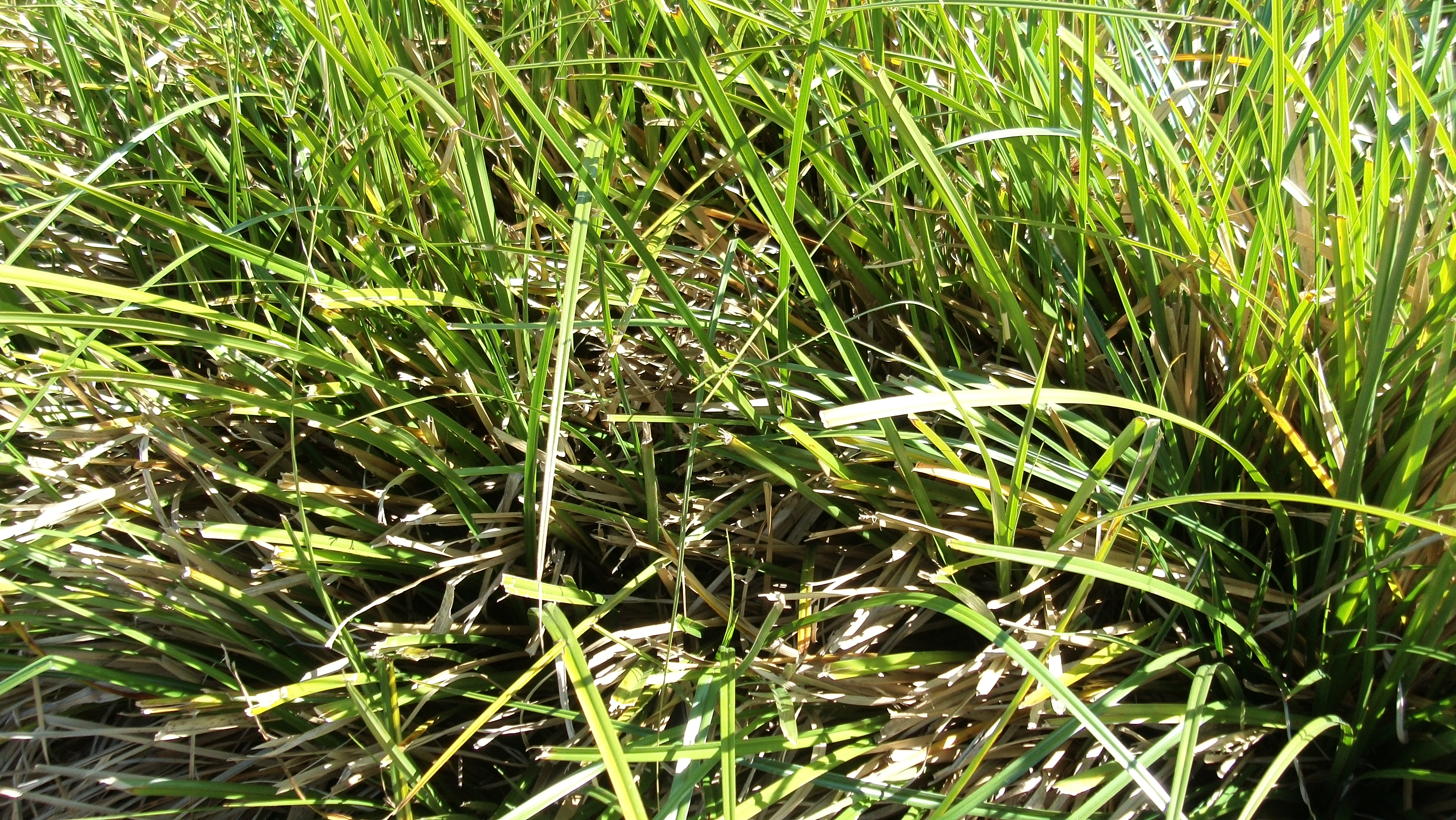
- Broad-leaved snow tussock

Scientific classification
- Kingdom: Plantae
- Clade: Tracheophytes
- Clade: Angiosperms
- Clade: Monocots
- Clade: Commelinids
- Order: Poales
- Family: Poaceae
- Genus: Chionochloa
- Species: C. flavescens

Binomial name
- Chionochloa flavescens Zotov

= Chionochloa flavescens =

Species of grass

Chionochloa flavescens, known as broad-leaved snow tussock or haumata in Māori. Endemic to New Zealand, there are several different sub species that look very similar. The leaves which are up to one centimetre wide is larger than most tussocks similar to it. The flower-plumes of about 30 centimetres (12 inches) appear around December to January and are quite open compared to C. conspicua and C. flavicans.

== Subspecies ==
The four subspecies are subsp. flavescens, subsp. brevis, subsp. hirta and subsp. lupeola. The most commonly cultivated form is ssp. brevis from the South Island.
