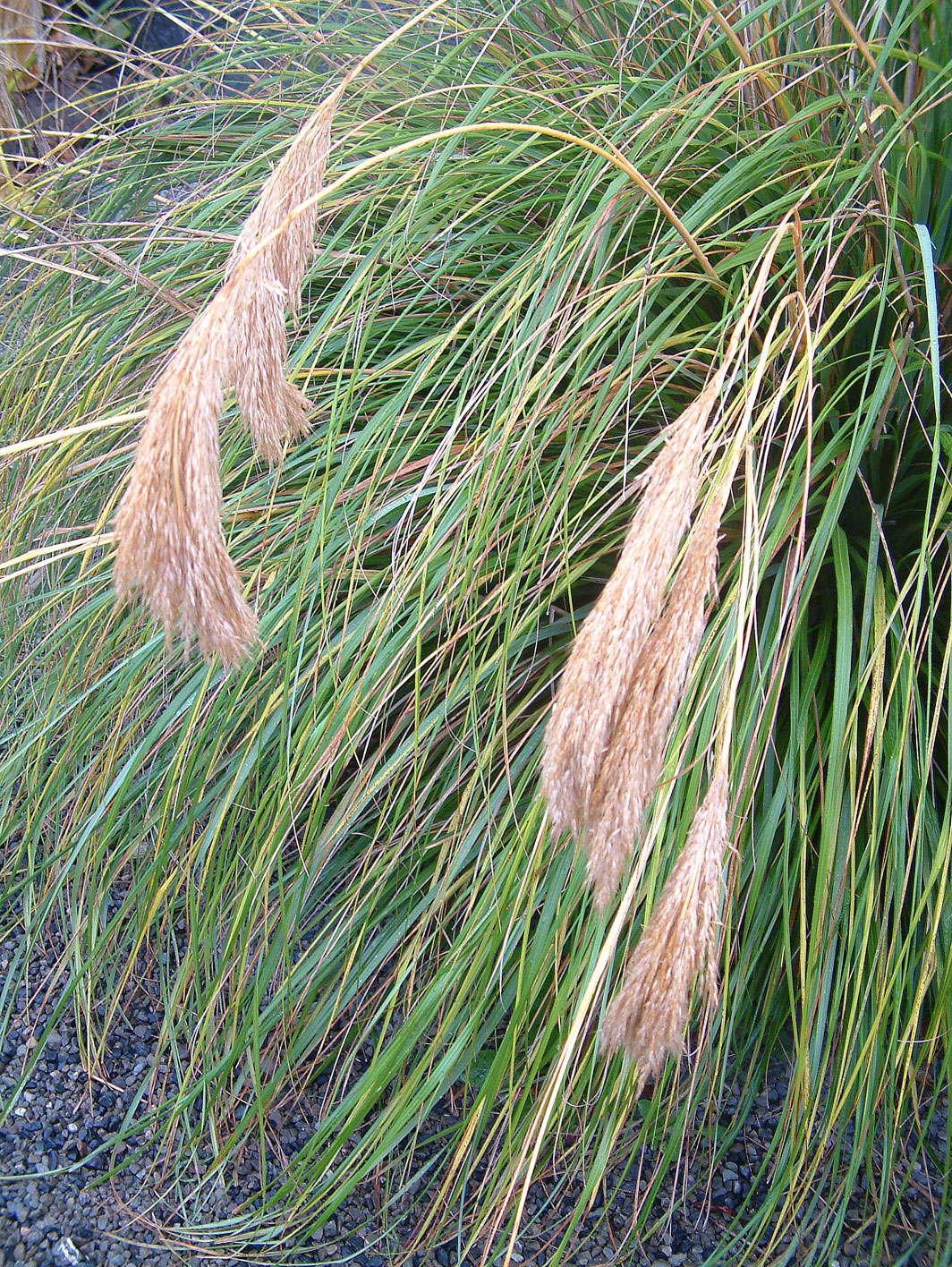
- Snow tussock showing plumes

Scientific classification
- Kingdom: Plantae
- Clade: Tracheophytes
- Clade: Angiosperms
- Clade: Monocots
- Clade: Commelinids
- Order: Poales
- Family: Poaceae
- Genus: Chionochloa
- Species: C. flavicans

Binomial name
- Chionochloa flavicans Zotov

= Chionochloa flavicans =

Species of grass

Chionochloa flavicans is a species of plant in the grass family, endemic to New Zealand.

The leaves, which are up to 12 mm wide, are larger than most tussocks similar to it. The plumes which appear in summer can make it look similar to the toetoe species and so sometimes it is called miniature toetoe although botanically this reference is quite incorrect. The plumes begin a green colour and as they age turn light brown.

The name is similar to C. flavescens although they visually look quite different. C. flavicans is one of the easier Chionochloa species to identify because of its distinctive plumes.

A different form, C. flavicans forma temata, can be found growing on Te Mata Peak near Havelock North.

It is quite widely planted by councils and for highway plantings due to its low maintenance.

== Distribution ==
It is endemic to the North Island of New Zealand and is found in the Coromandel Peninsula and also can be found from the East Cape to Hawke's Bay.

== Gallery ==
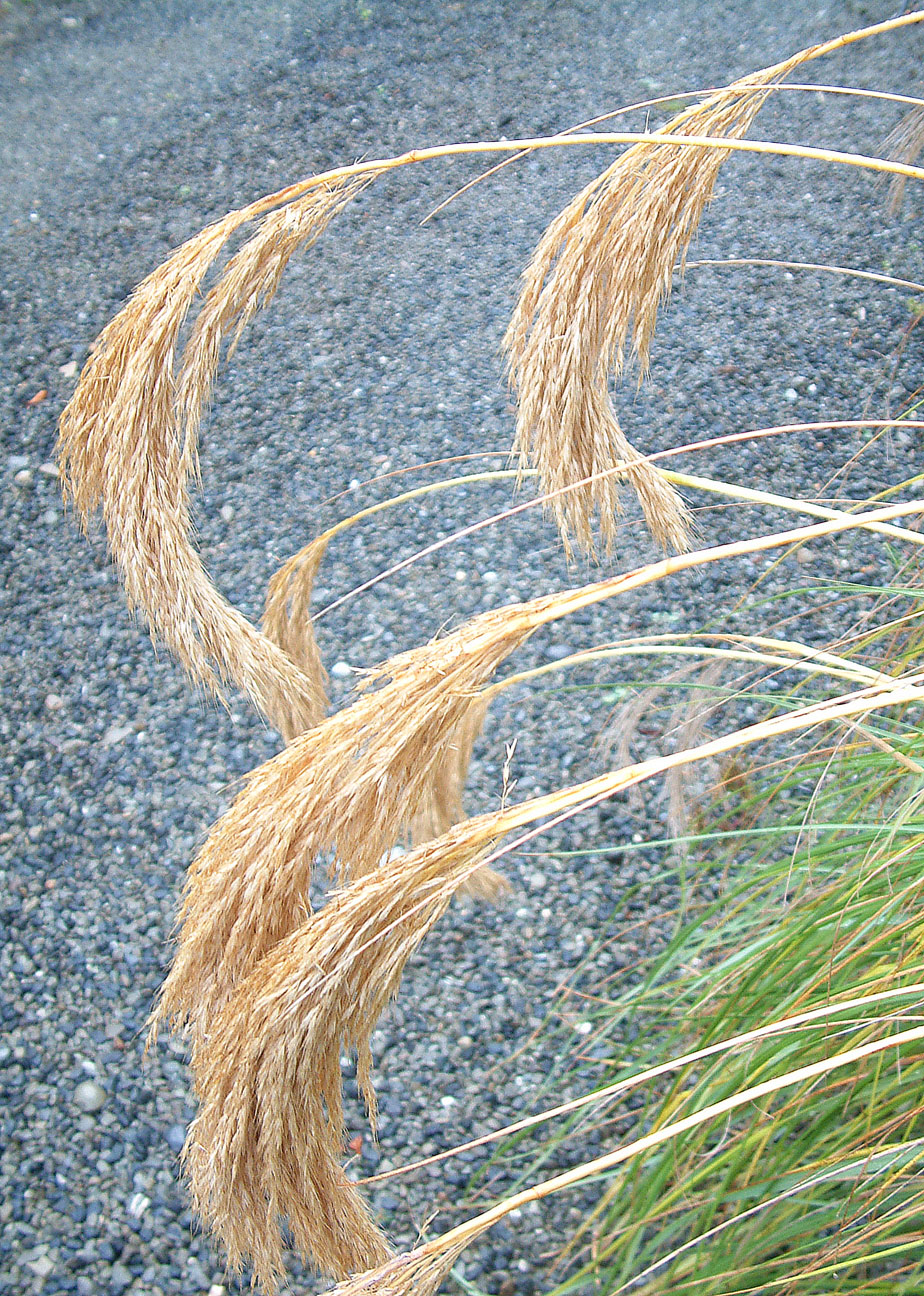
Plumes in March
