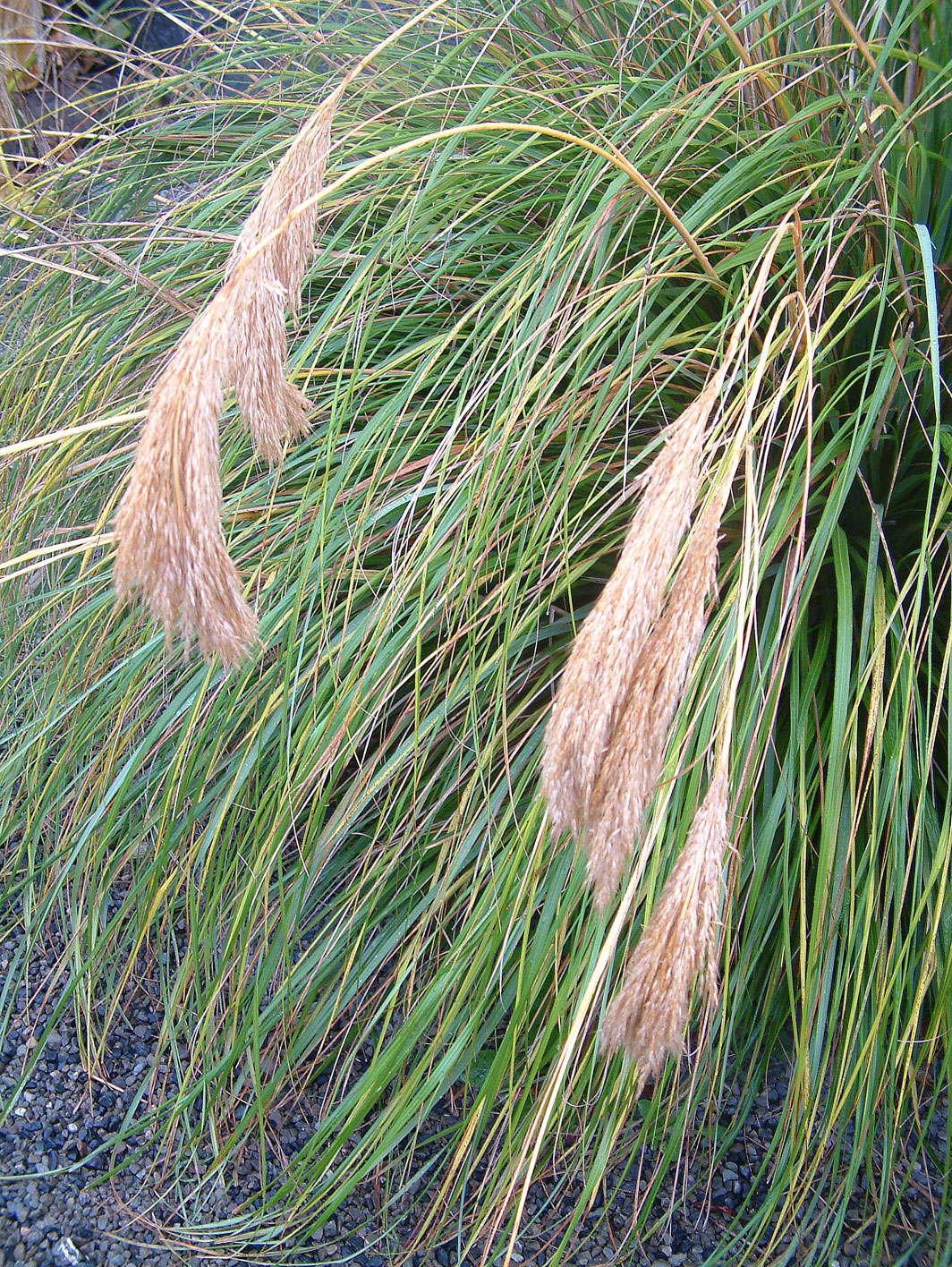
- Chionochloa flavicans

Scientific classification
- Kingdom: Plantae
- Clade: Tracheophytes
- Clade: Angiosperms
- Clade: Monocots
- Clade: Commelinids
- Order: Poales
- Family: Poaceae
- Subfamily: Danthonioideae
- Tribe: Danthonieae
- Genus: Chionochloa; Zotov, 1963

Type species
- Chionochloa rigida (Raoul) Zotov

= Chionochloa =

Genus of grasses

Chionochloa is a genus of tussock grass in the family Poaceae, found primarily in New Zealand with one known species in New Guinea and another on Lord Howe Island (part of Australia). Some of the species are referred to as snowgrass or snow tussock.

Most of the species in the genus grow in clumps, some up to 1.5 metres (4 feet 11 inches) tall. Red tussock dominates the tall tussock grasslands on the volcanic mountains of the North Island of New Zealand and can also be found in areas on the northern half of the South Island. Snow tussock, of which there are several species, can be found above the tree line together with other species.

Species

- Chionochloa acicularis Zotov – South I
- Chionochloa antarctica (Hook.f.) Zotov – Auckland Is, Campbell I
- Chionochloa archboldii (Hitchc.) Conert – New Guinea
- Chionochloa australis (Buchanan) Zotov – South I
- Chionochloa beddiei Zotov – North I
- Chionochloa bromoides (Hook.f.) Zotov – North I
- Chionochloa cheesemanii (Hack. ex Cheeseman) Zotov – North + South Is
- Chionochloa conspicua (G.Forst.) Zotov – North + South Is
- Chionochloa crassiuscula (Kirk) Zotov – South I
- Chionochloa defracta Connor – South I
- Chionochloa flavescens Zotov – North + South Is
- Chionochloa flavicans Zotov – North I
- Chionochloa frigida (Vickery) Conert – North + South Is
- Chionochloa howensis S.W.L.Jacobs – Lord Howe I
- Chionochloa juncea Zotov – South I
- Chionochloa lanea Connor - South I
- Chionochloa macra Zotov – South I
- Chionochloa nivifera Connor & K.M.Lloyd – South I
- Chionochloa oreophila (Petrie) Zotov – South I
- Chionochloa ovata (Buchanan) Zotov – South I
- Chionochloa pallens Zotov – North + South Is
- Chionochloa rigida (Raoul) Zotov – South I
- Chionochloa rubra Zotov – North + South Is
- Chionochloa spiralis Zotov – South I
- Chionochloa teretifolia (Petrie) Zotov – South I
- Chionochloa vireta Connor – South I

formerly included

see Rytidosperma

- Chionochloa pallida – Rytidosperma pallidum
