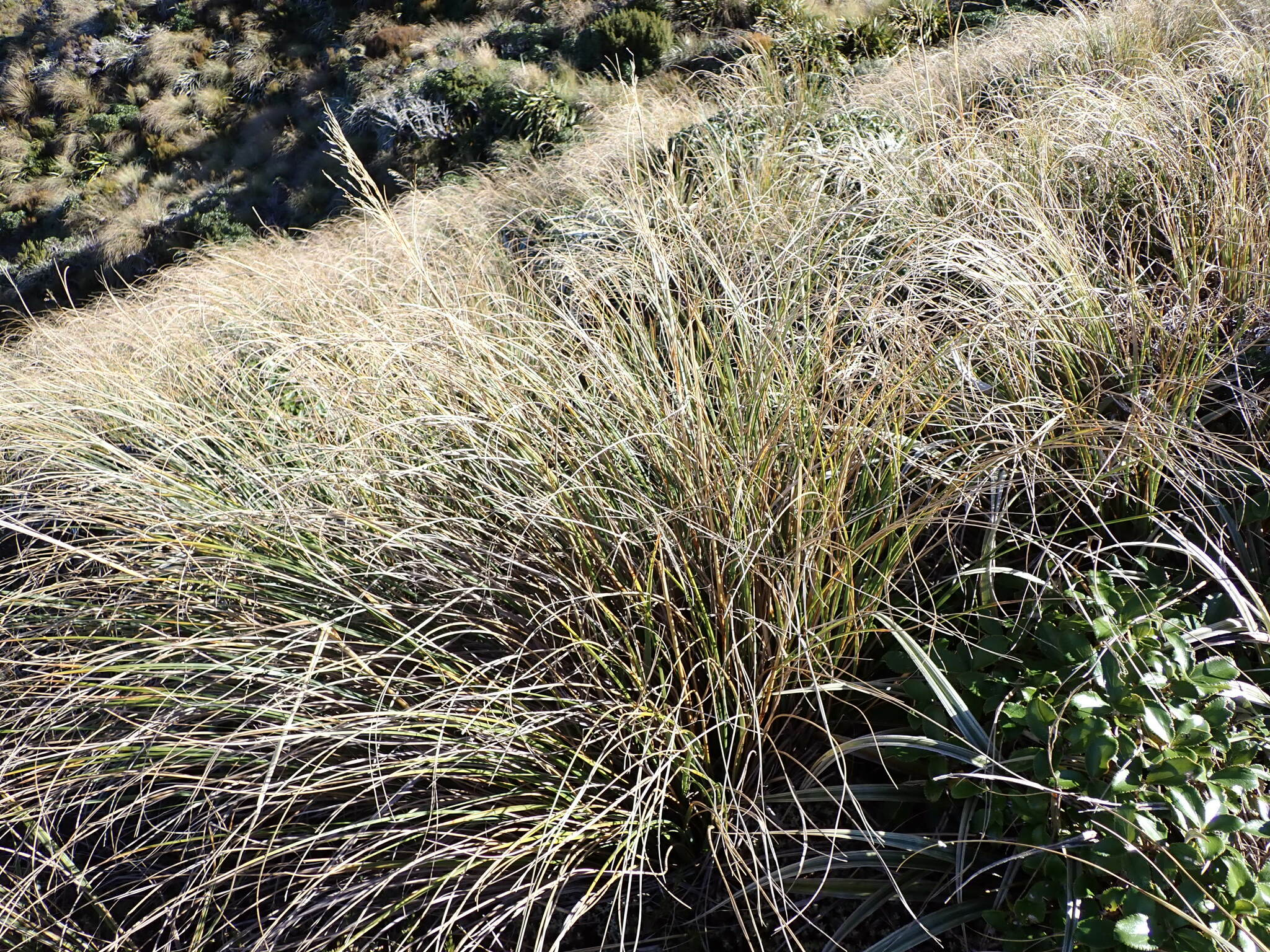
- Chionochloa pallens in Tararua Forest Park

Conservation status
- Not Threatened (NZ TCS)

Scientific classification
- Kingdom: Plantae
- Clade: Tracheophytes
- Clade: Angiosperms
- Clade: Monocots
- Clade: Commelinids
- Order: Poales
- Family: Poaceae
- Genus: Chionochloa
- Species: C. pallens

Binomial name
- Chionochloa pallens Zotov

= Chionochloa pallens =

Species of grass

Chionochloa pallens, or mid-ribbed snow tussock, is a species of grass in the Poaceae family and is endemic to New Zealand. It is a tall species with a pink inflorescence. However, descriptions of the nominate subspecies note that it is stout. It is found on both the North and South Island.

== Taxonomy ==
As of 2026 accepted subspecies are:

- C. pallens subsp. cadens
- C. pallens subsp. pallens
- C. pallens subsp. pilosa

== Distribution and habitat ==
C. pallens is endemic to New Zealand, and is found in alpine areas of the North Island from south of the Raukūmara Range, and in alpine areas of the South Island.

== Phenology ==
C. pallens exhibits mast seeding, with variations of flowering of up to 20-fold between different years, with zero flowering in some years. Mast seeding is an adaptation to the presence of predators, and results in predator satiation in years of high seed production, enabling reproduction of the plant despite the presence of predators.
