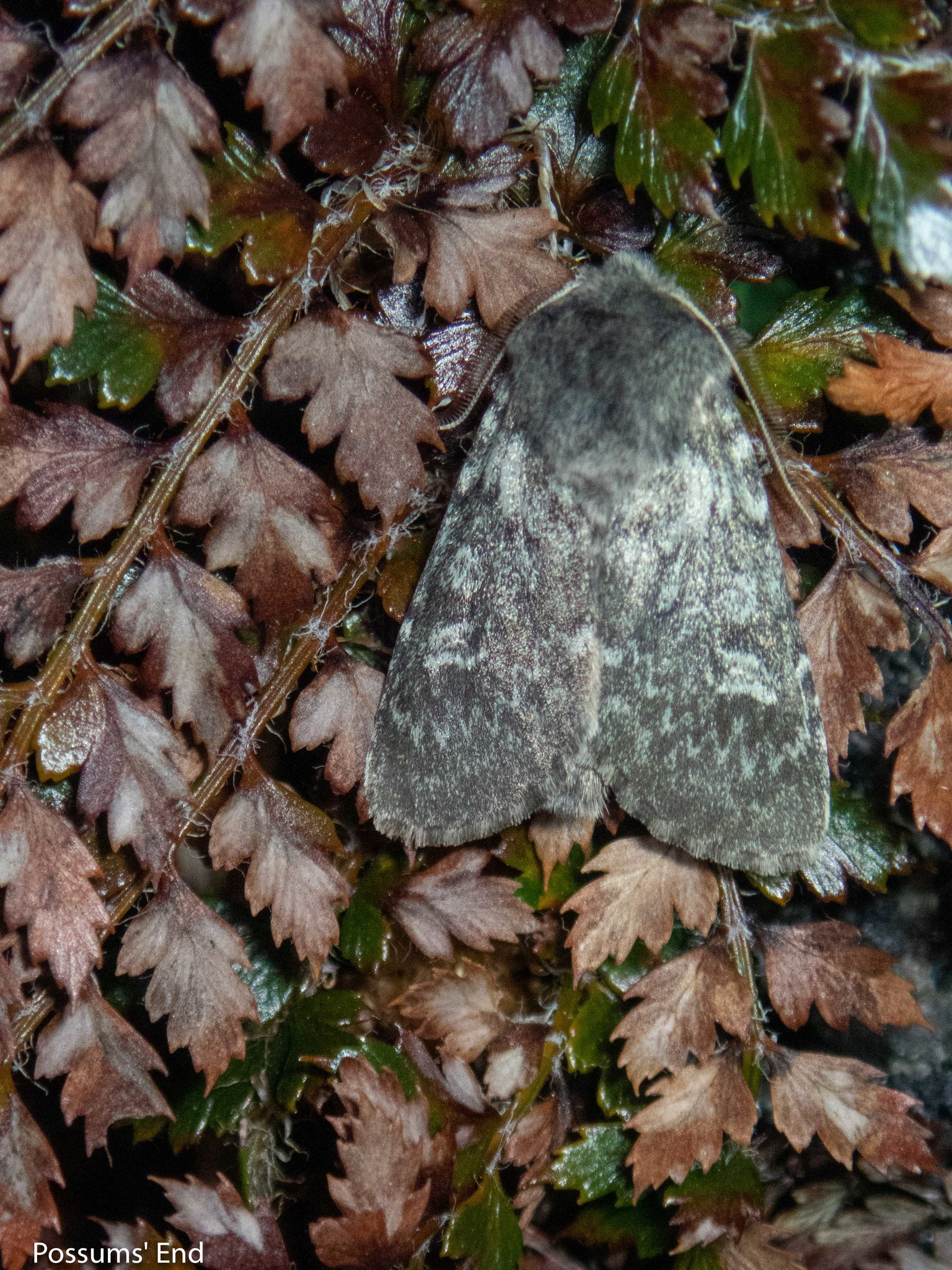
- male

Scientific classification
- Kingdom: Animalia
- Phylum: Arthropoda
- Clade: Pancrustacea
- Class: Insecta
- Order: Lepidoptera
- Superfamily: Noctuoidea
- Family: Noctuidae
- Genus: Ichneutica
- Species: I. eris

Binomial name
- Ichneutica eris Hoare, 2019

= Ichneutica eris =

Species of moth endemic to New Zealand

Ichneutica eris is a species of moth in the family Noctuidae. It is endemic to New Zealand where it is found in alpine habitat of the South Island. Adults are on the wing from November to February and are attracted to light.

== Taxonomy ==
This species was first described by Robert Hoare in 2019. The holotype specimen was collected near the Homer Tunnel by John Salmon in 1946. I. eris was named in honour of Eris in light of the difficulty of the confusion this species has caused lepidopterists.

== Description ==
Adults of this species are brownish-grey in colour, with whitish markings on the forewings as well as greyish dots along the forewing edge. The hindwings are grey in colour. The wingspan range for the male of the species is between 37 and 46 mm, and for the female is between 43 and 51 mm.

This species is similar in appearance to both I. cana and I. fibriata.

== Distribution and habitat ==
This species is endemic to New Zealand and can be found throughout the South Island in alpine habitat. This species overlaps with the range of I. cana although it appears to be more restricted in range than that species. However, I. eris can be found in the mountains surrounding Nelson, whereas I. cana is not present in that locality.

== Ecology ==
Little is known of the life history of this species. However, it is possible that the larvae exist on short alpine grasses and pupate on bare soil.

Adults of this species are on the wing from November to February. This species also appears to be attracted to light.
