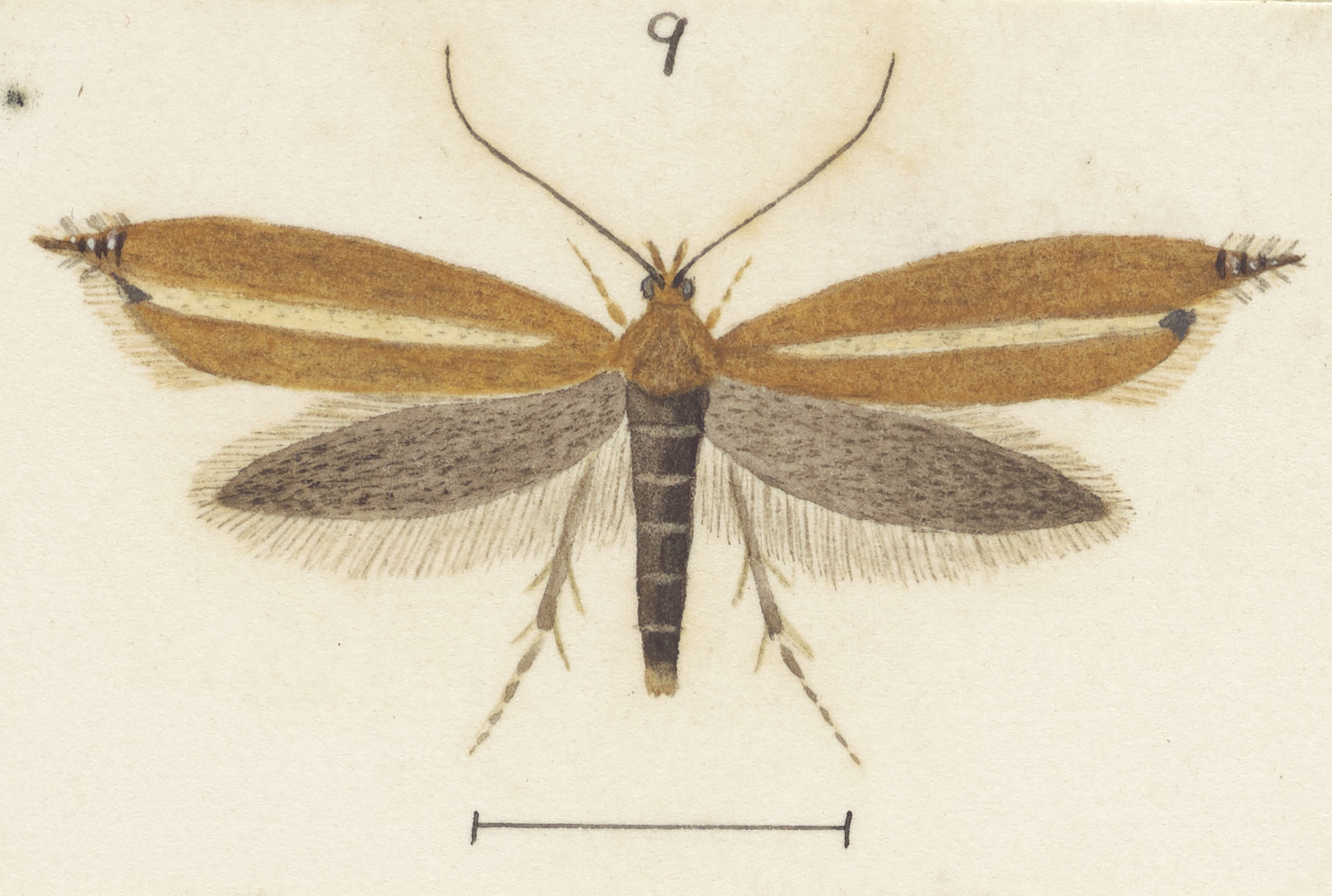
- Illustration of male

Scientific classification
- Kingdom: Animalia
- Phylum: Arthropoda
- Clade: Pancrustacea
- Class: Insecta
- Order: Lepidoptera
- Family: Glyphipterigidae
- Genus: Glyphipterix
- Species: G. bactrias

Binomial name
- Glyphipterix bactrias Meyrick, 1911

= Glyphipterix bactrias =

Species of moth

Glyphipterix bactrias is a species of sedge moth in the genus Glyphipterix. It was described by Edward Meyrick in 1911. It is found in New Zealand.
