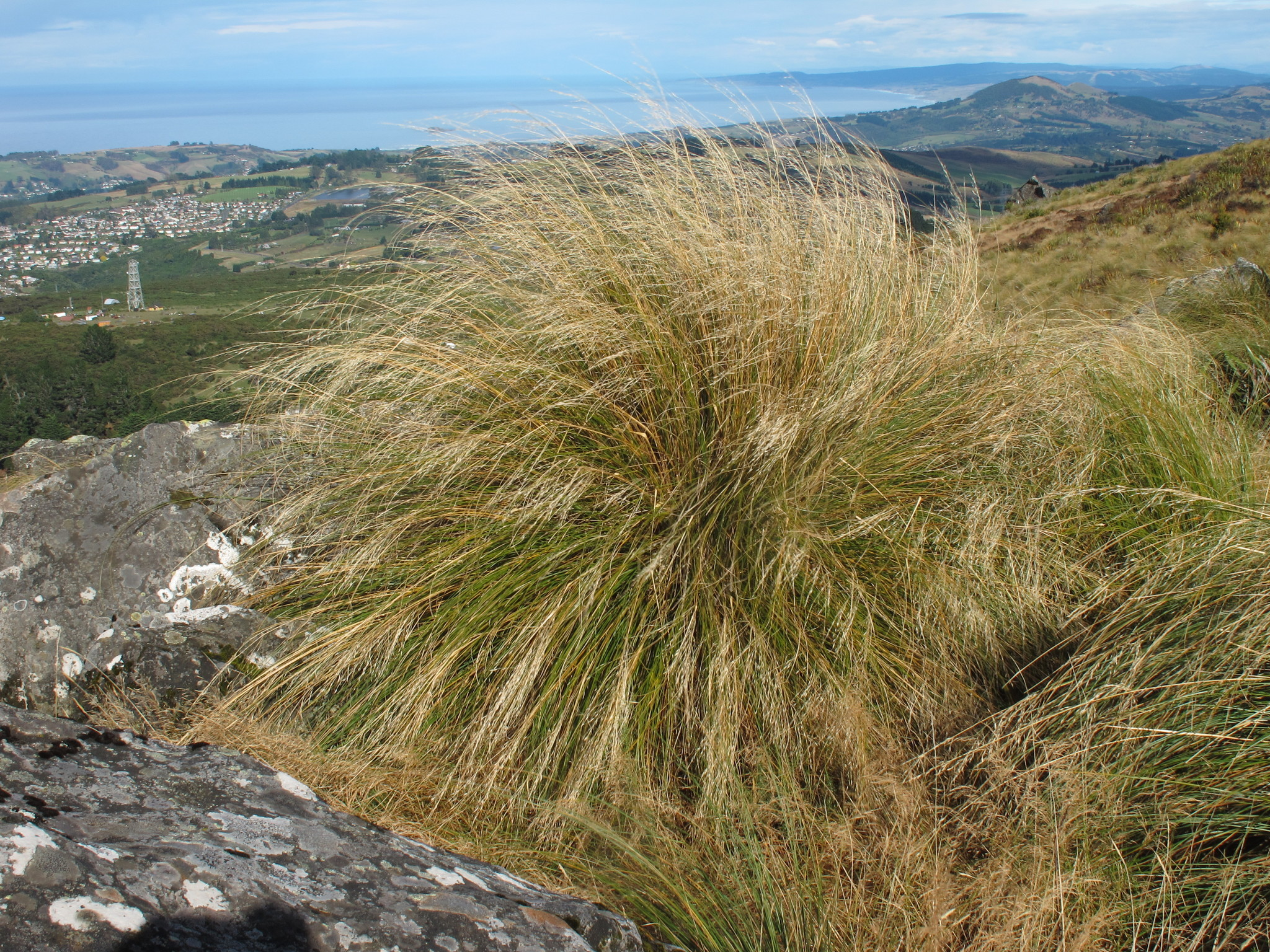

Conservation status
- Least Concern (IUCN 3.1)

Scientific classification
- Kingdom: Plantae
- Clade: Tracheophytes
- Clade: Angiosperms
- Clade: Monocots
- Clade: Commelinids
- Order: Poales
- Family: Poaceae
- Genus: Chionochloa
- Species: C. rigida

Binomial name
- Chionochloa rigida (Raoul) Zotov

= Chionochloa rigida =

Species of tussock grass

Chionochloa rigida, known commonly as narrow-leaved snow tussock and by its Māori name wī kura, is a species of tussock grass endemic to New Zealand. Two subspecies are recognised, including Chionochloa rigida rigida and Chionochloa rigida amara.

== Distribution ==
Found throughout the lower half of the South Island, from Banks Peninsula and east of the Southern Alps through to Southland.

The subspecies C. rigida amara has a more western distribution and is found south of around 43°S in the Southern Alps.

=== Habitat ===
Prefers montane to low alpine zones, but is known to descend to sea level in Otago. It prefers drier soils.

== Conservation ==
The narrow-leaved snow tussock is classified as "Least Concern" by the IUCN Red List and Not Threatened by the Department of Conservation.
