= Penalpine =

Penalpine environments consist of tall tussock shrubland. The term was created in order to refer to New Zealand environments, which were thought to be warmer and lower in elevation than other global environments for this sort of ecology, especially during the growing season, which might explain why the treeline was lower than in other areas. However, the term has since fallen out of use, as subsequent research has shown that this ecotype is not unique.
