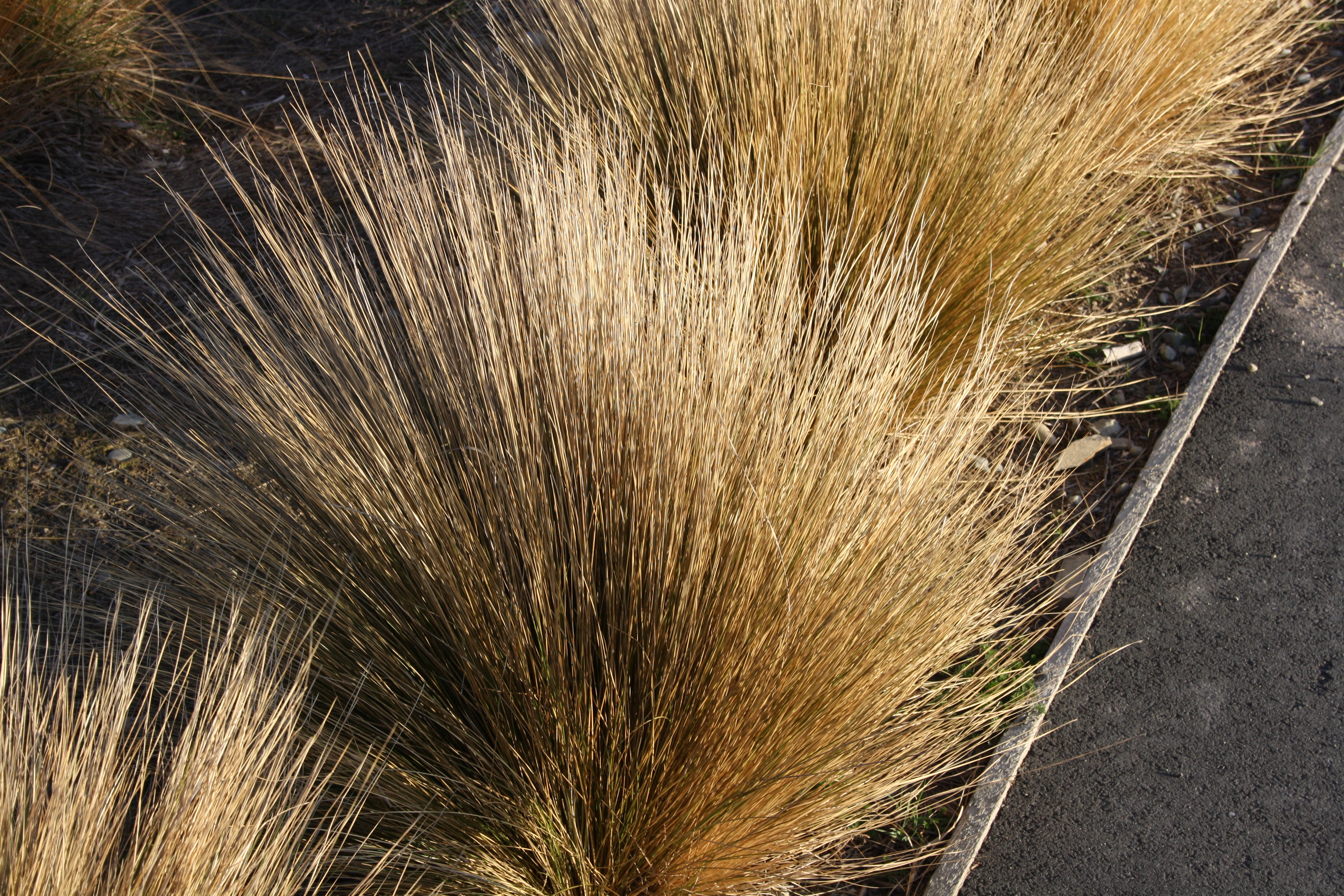

Scientific classification
- Kingdom: Plantae
- Clade: Tracheophytes
- Clade: Angiosperms
- Clade: Monocots
- Clade: Commelinids
- Order: Poales
- Family: Poaceae
- Genus: Chionochloa
- Species: C. rubra

Binomial name
- Chionochloa rubra Zotov

= Chionochloa rubra =

Species of grass

Chionochloa rubra, known commonly as red tussock grass, is a species of tussock grass in the grass family, endemic to New Zealand.

== Description ==
New Zealand has 22 endemic species of Chionochloa, including C. rubra, which has a distinctive appearance from other members in the genus. C. rubra has a long life span, meaning there is rarely dead foliage surrounding the plant — giving the species a clean, sleek and vertical look. The plant will grow up to 1–1.2m high in rich moist ground, with seed heads reaching even taller. The leaf blade themselves grow up to 1m long and 1.2mm in diameter, and the plant width itself is 50 cm in diameter (with little rhizomatous spread). There are usually long hairs next to the base of the leaf and prickle-teeth towards the apex that help distinguish it from other Chionochloa species. There are also rows of short hairs at the base of the leaf.

In dry habitat conditions such as dry clay soil the plant struggles to grow and may only reach 90 cm in height, causing possible confusion for other species of Chionochloa.

Depending on the subspecies, the tawny leaves' colour ranges from a green tone to its more dominant colour of bronze or red.

In general, C. rubra is a tall brown reddish plant with slender leaves that clump together forming its classic arc shape.

C. rubra has been found to display the unusual phenomenon of producing many seeds in response to decreased seed predation. In contrast, it was found to have a lower seed production at higher predation rate areas. Red tussocks seeds annually at low alpine areas, differs from other Chionochloa sp. Red tussocks mast seeding at higher altitudes. An explanation for these changes is that red tussocks do not have pronounced altitudinal ecotypes, seed predators satiation and mast seeding being ineffective at lower altitudes.

== Distribution and habitat ==
C. rubra is endemic to New Zealand. It is dispersed from the central volcanic fields and Huiarau Range to Stewart Island, and from the lower area of the penalpine belt to sea level in south of New Zealand.

=== Habitat ===
There are two different types of tussock-grassland: the "Low tussock-grassland" dominated by small tussock-grasses dominate, and "Tall tussock-grassland" dominated by generally larger tussocks." Red tussock (C. rubra) is predominantly found in Tall tussock-grassland, and covers most of the pumice-scoria soil located on the volcanic plateau between 900 and 1200 m in altitude.

Red tussock (C. rubra) is highly adaptable vegetation and can grow in exposed and windy environments. It can tolerate soils low in nutrients, and grow in relatively wet or dry soil conditions.

Red tussock (Chionochloa rubra) is a useful species in aiding the reestablishment of natural habitats, particularly as a buffer plant around wetland areas. C. rubra can be slow growing and prefers more cooler, wet and less humid climates. Though once established it is very resistant plant and can take plenty of abuse due to its hardy texture.

== Ecology ==
C. rubra plant's seeds are dispersed with the use of gravity and the wind with very little use of invertebrates or mammals as pollinating agents. Mass seeding is used as the main technique to prevent seed loss by predators (which are hard to satisfy due to their big appetite) and other competitor plants. Mass seeding is the production of a large quantity of seeds that are released all at once over a large area. It usually takes the plant a few years to produce enough seed to carry out the process. This form of spreading is particularly more prominent in the Takahe Valley in the Southland of New Zealand. Statistics and studies have shown that the mean annual loss ranges from 10–33% during a four-year studies in the Takahe Valley. So if not for mass seeding the plant would not be able to be successful as it is. The seed is dropped on well drained and moist soil where starts to grow. It flowers during the summer season from October to December and grows fruits all around from November to May.

=== Predation ===
The area of volcanic plateau is no longer untouched, with wild horses and cows having fed on it for many years and more recently rabbits having become common visitors on these tussock lands. But, the status of the red tussock (Chionochloa Rubra) is still primitive.

The inflorescences of Chionochloa spp. are attacked by at least two flies and one moth. Research taken place in Mt Hut, Canterbury, found two flies fed on Chionochloa pallens inflorescences, including the eggs and larvae of Diplotoxa Similis (Diptera: Chloropidae), which appeared in the inflorescences while they grew. The larvae primarily eat flowers, and most Diplotoxa Similis young have pupated by the end of the flowering span, if not over the winter as adults. Another fly was an unclassified cecidomyiid, which lays its eggs in the pollen of the floret during flowering, hatching into early-stage larvae. Late-stage larvae will turn to clear orange and are typically less active. Eventually, these are dropped at the end of the season. The moth is Megacraspedus Calamogonus (Lepidoptera: Gelechiidae) which has large, active caterpillars and appears in the early season.

== Cultivation ==
Chionochloa rubra is grown in cultivation. In the UK it has gained the Royal Horticultural Society's Award of Garden Merit.

== Cultural uses ==
In ancient southern Māori societies, people used tussock to make leggings that protected their bare legs from speargrass. Tussock was used in paraerae (sandals) for warmth, as it was found to be much warmer with patiti around the feet than without it.
