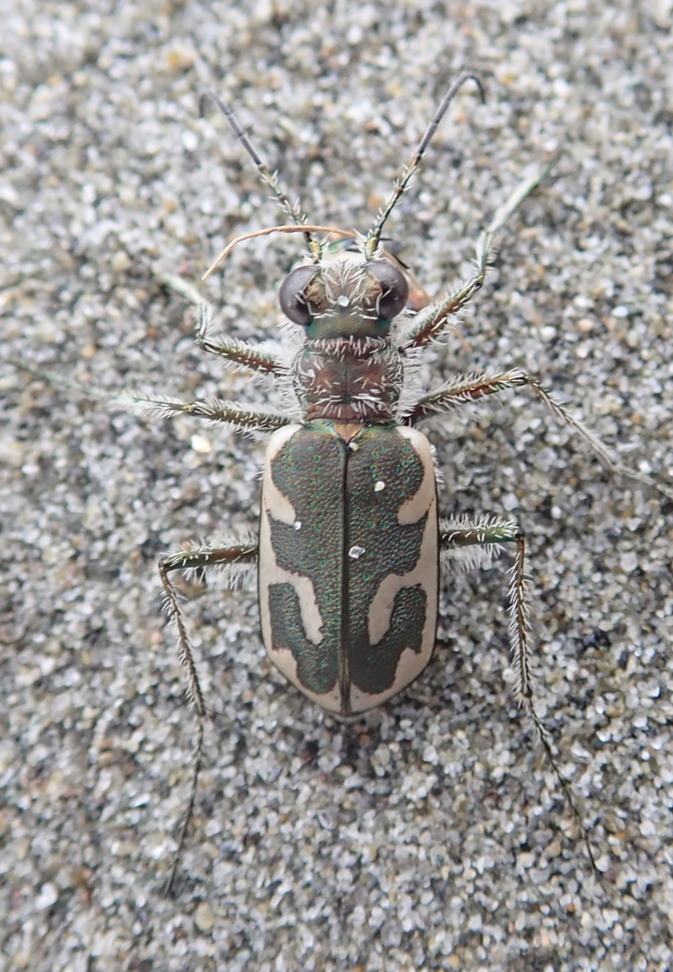

Scientific classification
- Kingdom: Animalia
- Phylum: Arthropoda
- Class: Insecta
- Order: Coleoptera
- Suborder: Adephaga
- Family: Cicindelidae
- Genus: Zecicindela
- Species: Z. feredayi

Binomial name
- Zecicindela feredayi (Bates, 1867)

Synonyms
- Synonymy: Cicindela feredayi Bates, 1867; Neocicindela feredayi Rivalier, 1963; Cicindela (Neocicindela) feredayi Larochelle & Larivière, 2001

= Zecicindela feredayi =

Species of beetle

Zecicindela feredayi, also known as Fereday's tiger beetle, is a species of tiger beetle endemic to New Zealand. It was first described by Henry Walter Bates in 1867 and its taxonomy was most recently revised in 2013. The species has been suggested to be roughly 5.75 million years old. It can be distinguished from other species in the Zecicindela genus by its uniform dark legs and by the elytra colour pattern. It is widespread throughout most of the country and can primarily be found on sand near rivers. They occur as adults from November to April. Like other tiger beetles, they are predators.

== Taxonomy ==
This species was described as Cicindela feredayi in 1867 by Henry Walter Bates from a single female specimen collected in Christchurch. The type specimen is reported to be stored in the National Museum of Natural History, France, but researchers have been unable to locate it. The specific name refers to the collector of the type specimen, entomologist Richard William Fereday.

Phylogeny

- - - - - - - - Zecicindela campbelli
              - Zecicindela perhispida
            - - Zecicindela brevilunata
              - Zecicindela giveni
          - - Zecicindela helmsi
            - Zecicindela helmsi
        - Zecicindela helmsi
      - Zecicindela austromontana
    - Zecicindela feredayi
  - - Zecicindela hamiltoni

In 1963, the species was transferred to the newly created Neocicindela, which contained all of New Zealand's tiger beetles. This genus was demoted to subgenus within Cicindela by André Larochelle and Marie-Claude Larivière in 2001 and the species became Cicindela feredayi again. Following a 2011 genetics study, Larochelle and Lariviere created the Zecicindela genus in 2013 and the species became Zecicindela feredayi. The common name of "Fereday's tiger beetle" was also suggested for the species.

=== Phylogeny ===
A 2011 study examined the genetic relationships of New Zealand's tiger beetles. The combined sequences of cytochrome oxidase I, cytochrome b and 16S rRNA found that Zecicindela formed a clade (group of organisms that comprise all descendants of a common ancestor) that was distinct and separate from Neocicindela. It also found that Z. feredayi was basal to all other Zecicindela except for Z. hamiltoni and Z. tekapoensis (the latter was not included in the study). The tree suggested that Z. feredayi diverged from other Zecicindela roughly 5.75 million years ago.

== Description ==
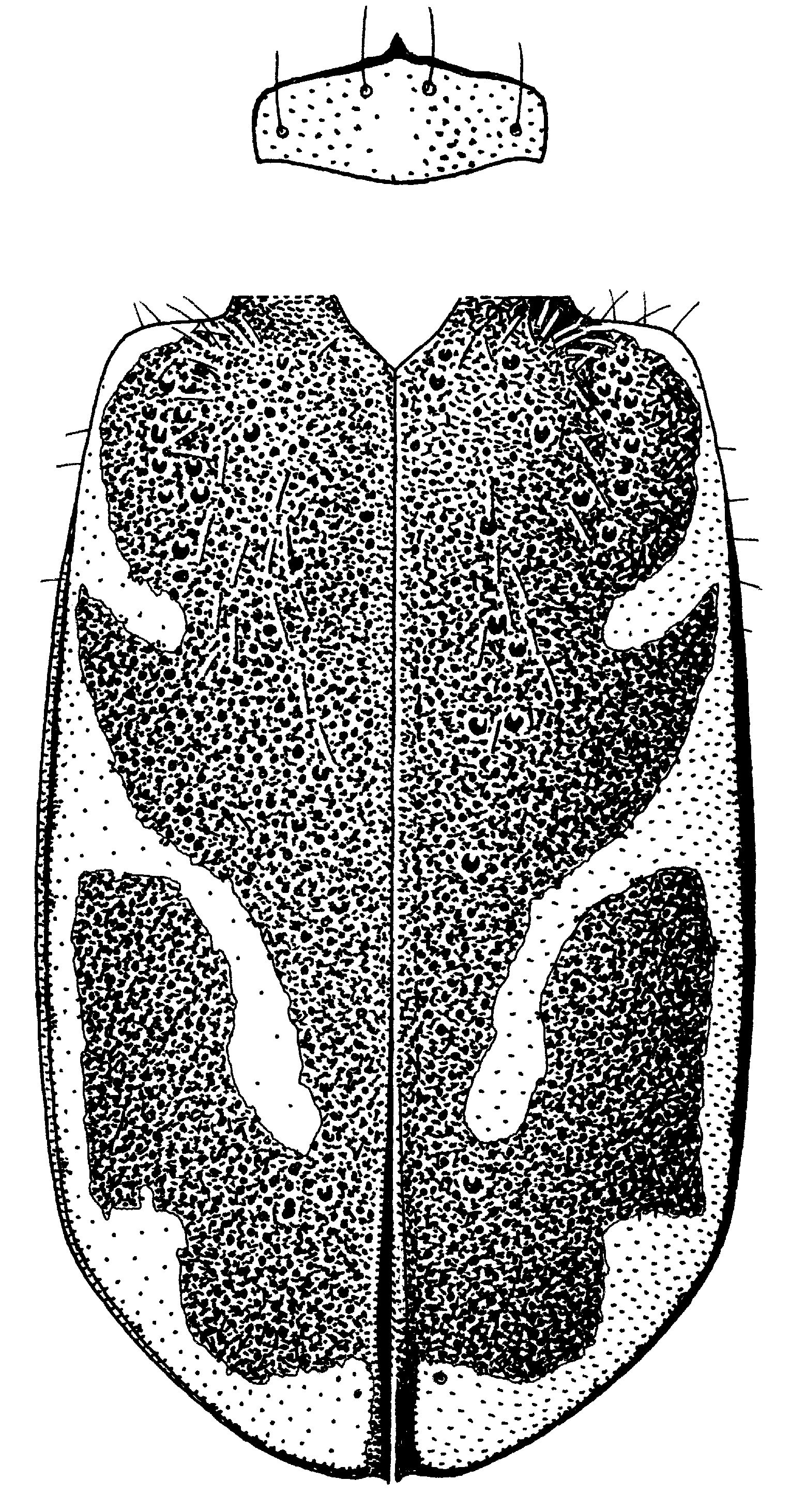
Labrum (top drawing) and elytra (main drawing) of Zecicindela feredayi

Zecicindela feredayi is best distinguished from all other Zecicindela by the dark colouration of the legs and the distinctive colour pattern of the elytra.

Adult beetles are 7.5–9.0 mm (0.30–0.35 in) in length. The head, antennae, thorax and legs are dark greenish black and covered in white hairs. Like all Zecicindela, the labrum (the "upper lip" of the beetles mouth) is unidentate (has one point anteriorly). It also has four long setae (hairs). The claws of the legs are notably shorter than tarsal segment five (the last segment of the legs).

The abdomen elytra has distinctive clean creamy pale markings on a greenish black somewhat metallic background. The elytra pale marking humeral lunule (marking at the anterior corner of the elytra) is well formed and sticks out from the margin. The middle band is angular and complete, reaching close to the apical lunule (the posterior pale marking sticking out from the margin markings). The dark areas of the elytra are covered in indistinct small bluish and greenish punctures.

== Distribution and habitat ==
This species is endemic to New Zealand and can be found in scattered localities throughout most of the country. It occurs throughout the South Island (where it is most common) as far south as Fiordland and in the North Island as far north as the Bay of Plenty region. They occur in lowland and montane altitudes. They usually occur on sandy areas along riversides (all Zecicindela are found near large bodies of water).

== Behaviour ==
They are predators that hunt actively for food using their strong running and flying, like other Zecicindela. They are diurnal and are most active when in direct sunlight. The adults occur from November to April. Nothing is known about Z. feredayi larvae specifically, but tiger beetle larvae are predators that live in burrows in the soil and attack passing prey.
