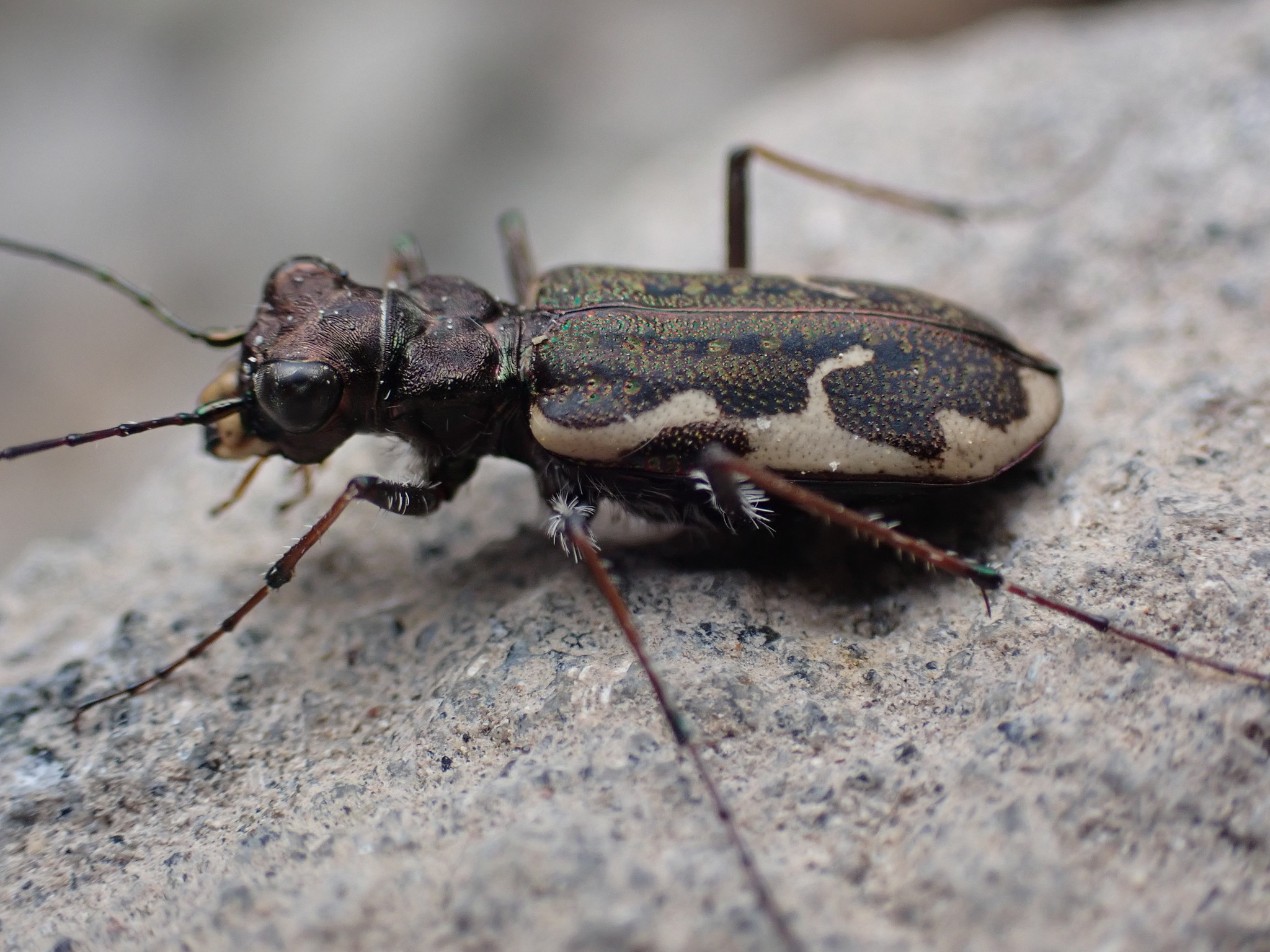

Scientific classification
- Kingdom: Animalia
- Phylum: Arthropoda
- Clade: Pancrustacea
- Class: Insecta
- Order: Coleoptera
- Suborder: Adephaga
- Family: Cicindelidae
- Genus: Neocicindela
- Species: N. tuberculata

Binomial name
- Neocicindela tuberculata (Fabricius, 1775)

Synonyms
- Cicindela tuberculata Fabricius, 1775; Cicindela tuberculosa Olivier, 1790a; Cicindela tuberculata tuberculata Chaudoir, 1865a; Cicindela huttoni Broun, 1877b; Neocicindela tuberculata Rivalier, 1963; Cicindela (Neocicindela) tuberculata Larochelle & Larivière, 2001

= Neocicindela tuberculata =

Species of beetle

Neocicindela tuberculata is a species of tiger beetle endemic to New Zealand and is sometimes referred to as the tuberculate tiger beetle or the common tiger beetle. It was first described in 1775 by Johan Christian Fabricius from specimens collected during Captain Cook's first voyage, making it the first ground beetle to be described from New Zealand. The species has been suggested to be roughly 0.92 million years old. It can be distinguished from other species in Neocicindela by the colour pattern of its elytra. It is widespread throughout most of New Zealand, and occurs as adults from September to July. As larvae, they live in burrows in dry clay banks. Both the adult and the larvae are predators that eat other insects. In the Māori language they are sometimes referred to as moeone, among other names.

== Taxonomy ==
This tiger beetle was first described as Cicindela tuberculata in 1775 by Johan Christian Fabricius in his first major publication, Systema entomologiae. The type specimens were collected by naturalists during Captain Cook's first voyage, which was the first time naturalists collected specimens from New Zealand. As such, this species is regarded as the first description of a ground beetle from New Zealand. The type specimens are stored in the Natural History Museum of London.

An early description of the larvae was provided in 1867 by Francis de Castelnau. The species received a taxonomic revision in 1846, in which it was given an updated description, although little new information was presented. In 1877, Thomas Broun described the species again as Cicindela huttoni, named after entomologist Frederick Hutton. It was named as a different species because Broun considered it to be less robust in form. This was later recognized as a synonym in 1936.

In 1963, the species was transferred to the newly created Neocicindela, which initially contained all of New Zealand's tiger beetle fauna. N. tuberculata became the type species of this genus. This genus was demoted to subgenus in 2001 and the species was reassigned to Cicindela by André Larochelle and Marie-Claude Larivière. It was most recently revised in 2013 by Larochelle and Lariviere, who reassigned it to the Neocicindela genus. The common name of "tuberculate tiger beetle" was also suggested for the species.

=== Phylogeny ===
Phylogeny

- - - - Neocicindela tuberculata
      - Neocicindela latecinta
    - Neocicindela latecinta
  - - Neocicindela waiouraensis
    - Neocicindela dunedensis
- Neocicindela parryi

A 2011 study examined the genetic relationships of New Zealand's tiger beetles. The combined sequences of cytochrome oxidase I, cytochrome b and 16S rRNA suggested that Neocicindela formed a clade (group of organisms that comprise all descendants of a common ancestor) that was distinct and separate from a Neocicindela clade later sheared off to form the genus Zecicindela. It found that within the dataset, N. tuberculata is most closely related to Neocicindela latecinta, from which it diverged around 0.92 million years ago.

== Description ==
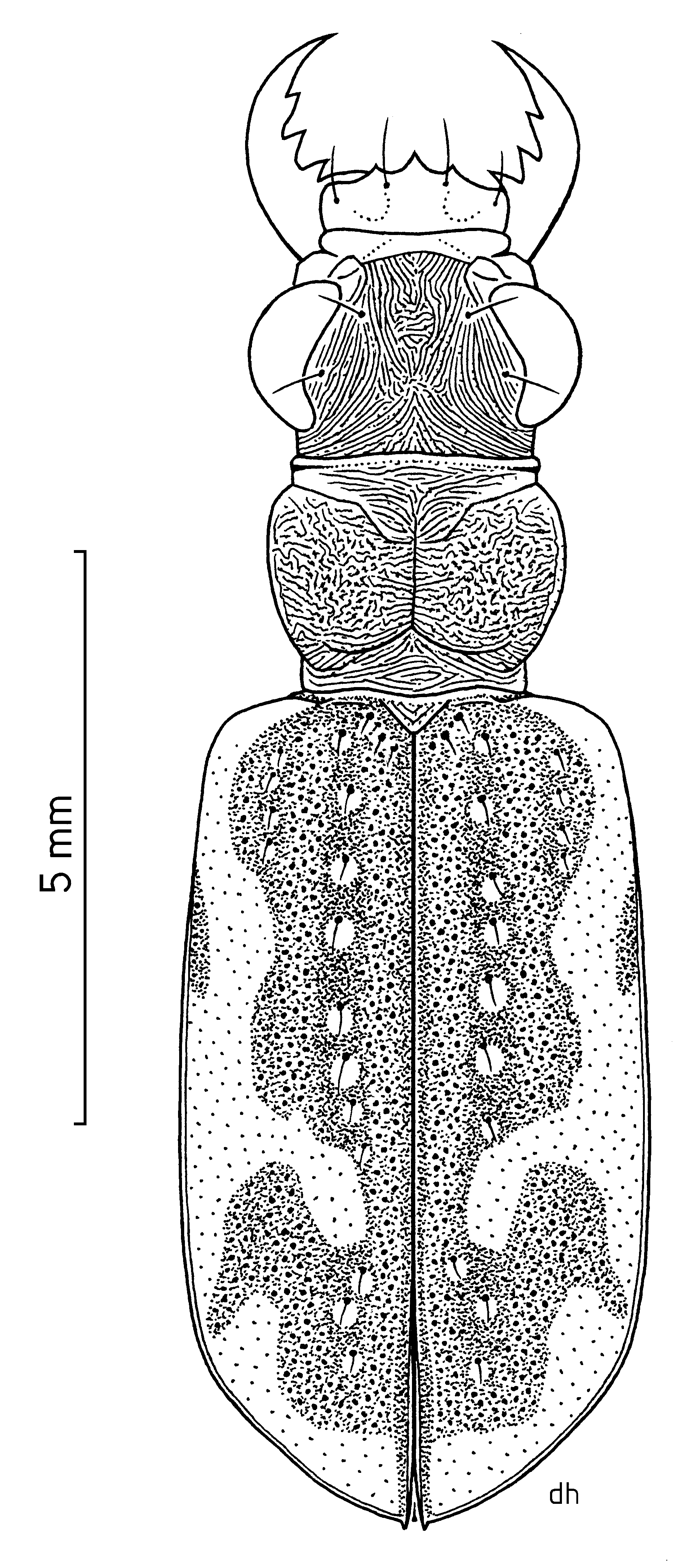

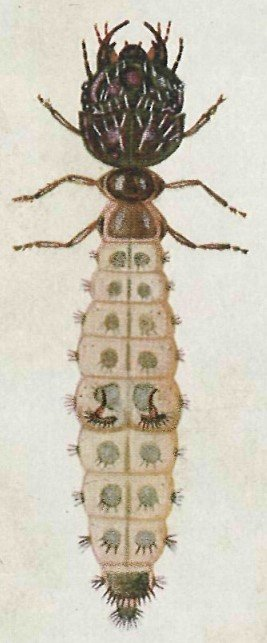
Painting of larva

As adults, Neocicindela tuberculata are best distinguished from all other species of Neocicindela by the combination of a single setiferous pore (one pore with a long hair sticking out of it) on the first antenna segment, and by the colour pattern of the abdomen.

The beetle is about 9–12 millimetres (350–470 mils) in length with a dark brown head and pronotum. The antennae and femora are dark, whilst the tibia and tarsi are pale. The first antennal segment also has anywhere between five and nine setiferous pores. The elytra (wing coverings or hardened forewings) are moderately wide and have a dark brown background with some tinges of velvet black. The dark areas of the elytra are shiny, somewhat metallic and are covered in small, green, metallic punctures. The elytra have numerous distinctive pale yellow markings. The humeral lunule (marking at the upper corner of the elytra) is fused with a marking along the middle margin of the elytra called the marginal line. The middle band (Band sticking out from the marginal line) distinctly sticks out and is angled towards the apical lunule (part of the yellow marking sticking out near the tip of the abdomen). The marginal line is separated from the apical lunule. The shape of the elytra also begin to widen behind the middle.

=== Larvae ===
The larvae are 20 millimetres (790 mils) in length when in their final instar before moulting. The head and prothorax form a single circular flattened shape. The mandibles are sickle-shaped. The labrum of the larvae is well-developed and projects from the head of the insect. The tarsi of the legs are two-jointed and have double claws. The larvae slowly widens after segment five and segment nine has a pronounced dorsal hump. The abdomen also has a pair of hooks that the larvae uses to assist it with moving around in its burrow.

== Distribution and habitat ==
Neocicindela tuberculata are found endemic to New Zealand where they are found across all regions of the North Island as well as in the Marlborough and Tasman districts of the South Island. They can be found from lowland to montane altitudes. These beetles are found in most habitats but generally prefers open areas such as tussock grasslands and dry clay banks, as well as modified habitat such as roadsides and gardens. They also sometimes occur on dark ironsand beaches, where they have been seen co-occurring with the tiger beetle Zecicindela perhispida. Because they favour open habitat, it has been suggested that extensive deforestation in New Zealand has caused them to become more abundant and widespread.

== Biology ==
The adults occur from September to July, with mating occurring during February. The larvae are known to mature into adults around December to February. The larvae of Neocicindela tuberculata prefer to dig their burrows in on dry soil, particularly exposed sand or peaty soil as well as clay banks. The burrows are vertical and can be up to 15 centimetres (5.9 in) deep. N. tuberculata are preyed upon by birds such as kiwi and magpie. They are also preyed upon by robber flies. To protect themselves from predators, the adult can emit a musky smell when disturbed. In addition to this, they are fast runners and can jump 2–3 metres (6.6–9.8 ft) in distance. N. tuberculata beetles are diurnal (active in daylight/sunshine) and are most active in direct sunlight.

Both the adult and the larvae of N. tuberculata are predators of other insects. The adults of N. tuberculata eat mainly caterpillars and flies. The larvae are known to feed on flies.

== In Māori culture ==
This species has been referred to as several Māori names, which are applied to tiger beetles in general. One such term is moeone, which may refer to the adult or larvae. Other terms exist such as muremure, pāpapa, kapuku, kurikuri and hāpuku. In Māori tradition, moeone larvae are reportedly pests of kumara crops. However, since these larvae are predatory, it is possible this term includes other larvae that are the true pests of kumara. In Ngati Whatua culture, Kui (a demigoddess) is said to manifest as a tiger beetle.
