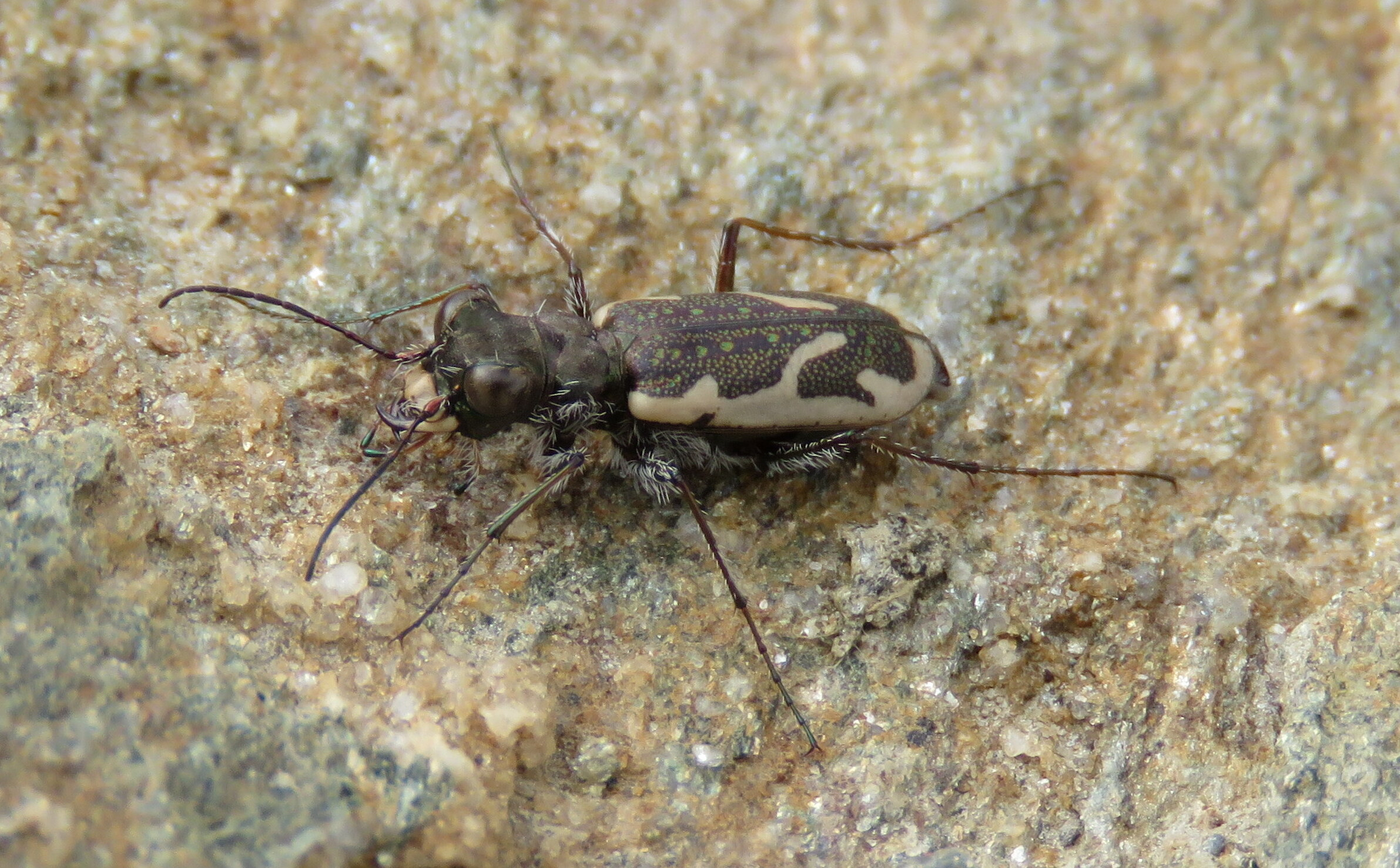

Scientific classification
- Kingdom: Animalia
- Phylum: Arthropoda
- Clade: Pancrustacea
- Class: Insecta
- Order: Coleoptera
- Suborder: Adephaga
- Family: Cicindelidae
- Genus: Neocicindela
- Species: N. dunedensis

Binomial name
- Neocicindela dunedensis (Laporte de Castelnau, 1867)

Synonyms
- Cicindela dunedensis Laporte de Castelnau, 1867; Cicindela dunedinensis Hutton, 1874; Neocicindela dunedinensis Hutton 1874; Cicindela wakefieldi Bates, 1874; Neocicindela wakefieldi Bates, 1874

= Neocicindela dunedensis =

Species of beetle

Neocicindela dunedensis, also known as the Dunedin tiger beetle, is a small species of tiger beetle in the genus Neocicindela endemic to New Zealand.

== Species description ==
Neocicindela dunedensis is the smallest member of its genus, and also the smallest tiger beetle species in New Zealand, with a body length ranging from 7mm to 8.7mm. The head, thorax and markings on the elytra are dark brownish, though a greenish or bronze iridescence can also be seen on these parts of the body. The antennae are also a dark colour. As with other Neocicindela species, N. dunedensis has got distinctive markings on the elytra. The pale markings on the elytra are whitish and relatively wide. The humeral lunule is fused with the marginal line, with the middle band being complete and narrow. The middle band also nearly reaches or extends slightly past the base of the apical lunule. The marginal line is fused with the apical lunule. The apical ends of the elytra are either only mildly serrulate, or have no serrations. The darker markings on the elytra are also adorned with many small green speckles and punctures, and are moderately shiny. The elytra markings are parallel with one another. The labrum and sides of the mandibles are a whitish colour, though the mandibles have darker tips. The labrum is also tridentate (has three points). The pronotum has a few setae near the anterolateral angles, but is otherwise mostly glabrous, with its sides being strongly rounded. On the underside of the thorax, such as at the proepisternum, there are prominent bristle-like setae. The legs are slender and relatively long, as with other Neocicindela species. The femora are dark in colouration, whereas the tibia and tarsal segments are a paler colour. The tarsal claws are significantly shorter than the 5th tarsal segment, being about half its length. The ventral side of the abdomen is glabrous. Compared to some other members of its genus, N. dunedensis has a somewhat slender body shape.

== Distribution and habitat ==
Like all other members of its genus, Neocicindela dunedensis is endemic to New Zealand. N. dunedensis is restricted to the South Island, where it occurs in the eastern and interior regions of the island. It is observed most frequently in Central Otago and adjacent locations, the Mackenzie Basin, and other areas of inland Canterbury. They have been found in abundance at the Pukaki and Tekapo River flats. However, they have also been observed and collected from other areas of Otago, Canterbury and Marlborough.

Neocicindela dunedensis is generally an inhabitant of dry habitat types, and can be considered xeriphilous. It has been found in both montane and lowland areas. N. dunedensis can be found living in various dry exposed and semi-vegetated habitats, such as dry river flats, open areas of uncultivated herbaceous ground cover, open spaces between native shrubs, glacial Loess, edges of dirt roads and paths, eroded cliffs and hillsides, and possibly even undisturbed gardens within its geographical range. Since N. dunedensis is known to inhabit both low elevation and comparatively higher elevation habitats, this suggests that it may be able to tolerate a wide range of ecological conditions.

== Ecology ==
As is the case with other members of its genus, Neocicindela dunedensis is a swift predator of other small insects, pursuing their prey by running them down, or occasionally by brief yet fast flights. Tiger beetles are known to have different approaches in hunting different prey species, and can often recognise what type of prey they are attempting to hunt, with behaviour such as this most likely being applicable to Neocicindela, including N. dunedensis. Whereas the adults are active pursuit predators, the larvae are ambush sit-and-wait predators that live in burrows in the ground and catch prey as it passes by their burrow entrance, which is typical of other members of the genus. The mating season for N. dunedensis takes place in January. Even though they are fast flyers, they typically prefer to run and can be reluctant to fly.

The larvae of Neocicindela, including Neocicindela dunedensis, are sit-and-wait predators that live in vertical burrows in exposed soil. The first body segment of the larva is hardened, camouflaged, and shaped in such a way that it acts to block the burrow entrance. The larvae also have prominent hook-like appendages midway down the body in order to brace the larva when struggling with prey. The larvae of Neocicindela species, likely also including N. dunedensis, may take roughly a year to finish developing

Neocicindela dunedensis overlaps in distribution with a few other tiger beetle species, most notably the larger and more widespread Neocicindela latecincta, and the range-restricted Zecicindela tekapoensis of the Mackenzie Basin. In the Mackenzie Basin, it was noted that N. dunedensis were most frequently collected during December, rather than in March. In general this species is active during the warmer months, and have been observed and collected from November through to March.

== Taxonomy ==
This species was first described by François-Louis Laporte, comte de Castelnau in 1867 and originally named Cicindela dunedensis. The type locality is possibly Dunedin. This species was placed in the genus Neocicindela in 2005.

Neocicindela dunedensis is most closely related to the species Neocicindela waiouraensis, which is a larger species endemic to the North Island. It is thought that N. dunedensis and N. waiouraensis diverged from each other about 4 million years ago, during the Pliocene.

== Etymology ==
In the past there have been inconsistencies with the spelling of the scientific name that have been accidentally perpetuated by other scientists. In 1880, Broun accidentally misspelled the specific name as dunedinensis, instead of the correct dunedensis. This misspelling was perpetuated by a few other scientists until 1934. Some New Zealand museums do have specimens of N. dunedensis, including the Te Papa Museum and the Auckland War Memorial Museum.
