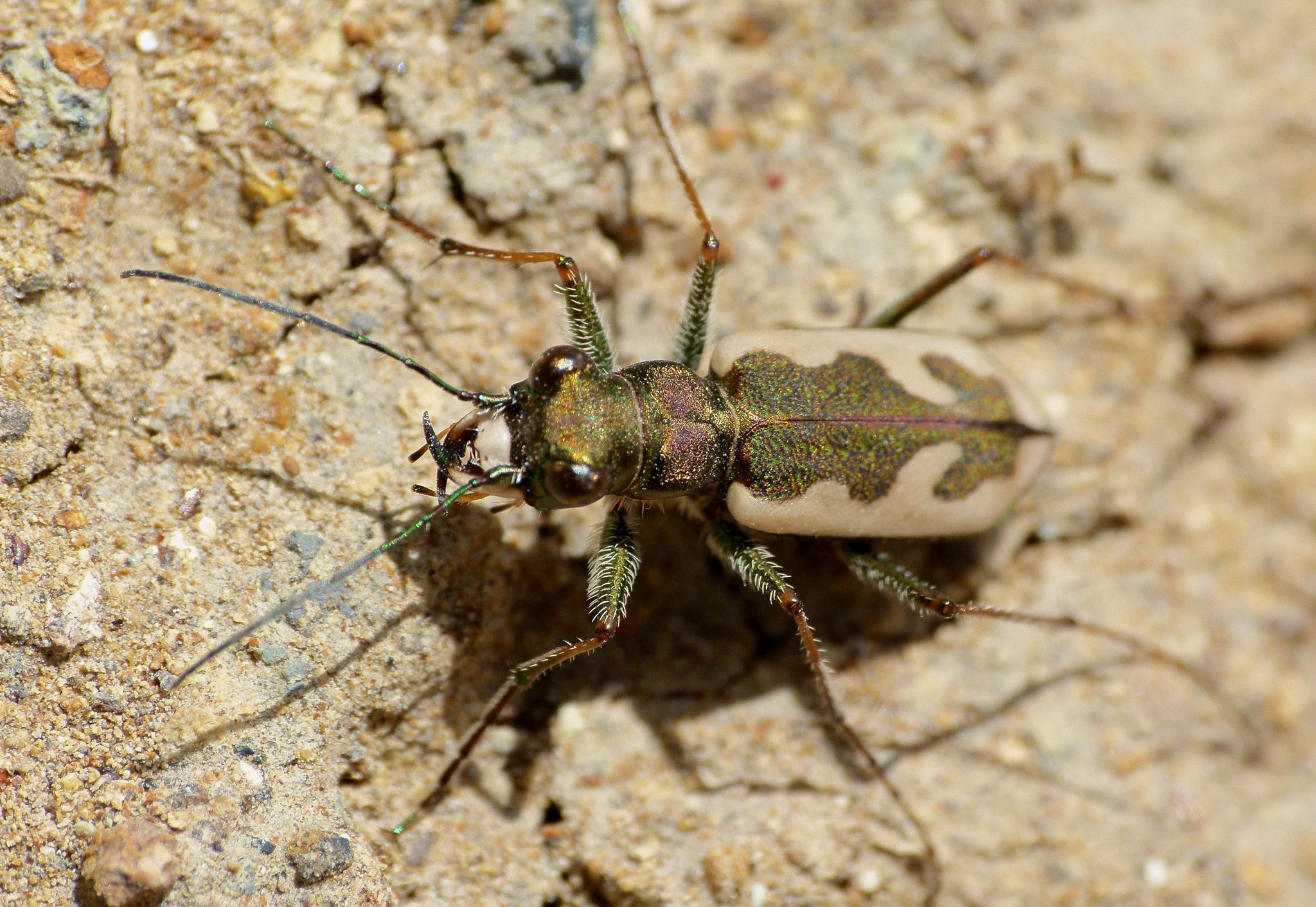

Scientific classification
- Kingdom: Animalia
- Phylum: Arthropoda
- Clade: Pancrustacea
- Class: Insecta
- Order: Coleoptera
- Suborder: Adephaga
- Family: Cicindelidae
- Genus: Neocicindela
- Species: N. latecincta

Binomial name
- Neocicindela latecincta White, 1846

= Neocicindela latecincta =

Species of beetle

Neocicindela latecincta, commonly known as the wide-banded tiger beetle, is a species of tiger beetle found across New Zealand's South Island.

== Species description ==
An adult's body length is 11-13.3 mm, which is unusually small for tiger beetles. The head and pronotum of the beetle are a dark brown. The elytra are mostly dark brown in the center with a light-yellow wavy patch on the outsides of the elytra. An oblique band (wider than in Neocicindela tuberculata) doesn’t extend past the base of the apical lunule (a crescent shaped marking at the tip of the elytra). There is a row of small or poorly developed green foveae (small depressions found on the beetle's exoskeleton) on the elytra. There is a green metallic lustre (a shiny appearance caused by structures of the exoskeleton rather than pigmentation) on the dark areas of the elytra, pronotum and top of its head. The tarsal claws (small hook like feet at the end of an insect's legs) are about five times shorter than segment five. The tarsi and tibiae are mostly pale in colour.

== Global range ==
The wide-banded tiger beetle is endemic to the South Island of New Zealand.

== Habitat ==
The wide-banded tiger beetle has been found in areas near the Taieri River and Estuary, and potentially on clay banks in the Otago region.

== Cultural uses ==
The larvae of Neocicindela sp. have been used as a popular bait for fishing by Māori.
