= Zecicindela savilli =

Scientific classification
- Domain: Eukaryota
- Kingdom: Animalia
- Phylum: Arthropoda
- Class: Insecta
- Order: Coleoptera
- Suborder: Adephaga
- Family: Cicindelidae
- Genus: Zecicindela
- Species: Z. savilli

Binomial name
- Zecicindela savilli (Wiesner, 1988)

Synonyms
- Neocicindela savilli Wiesner, 1988

Species of beetle

Zecicindela savilli is a species of tiger beetle. This species is found in New Zealand.
