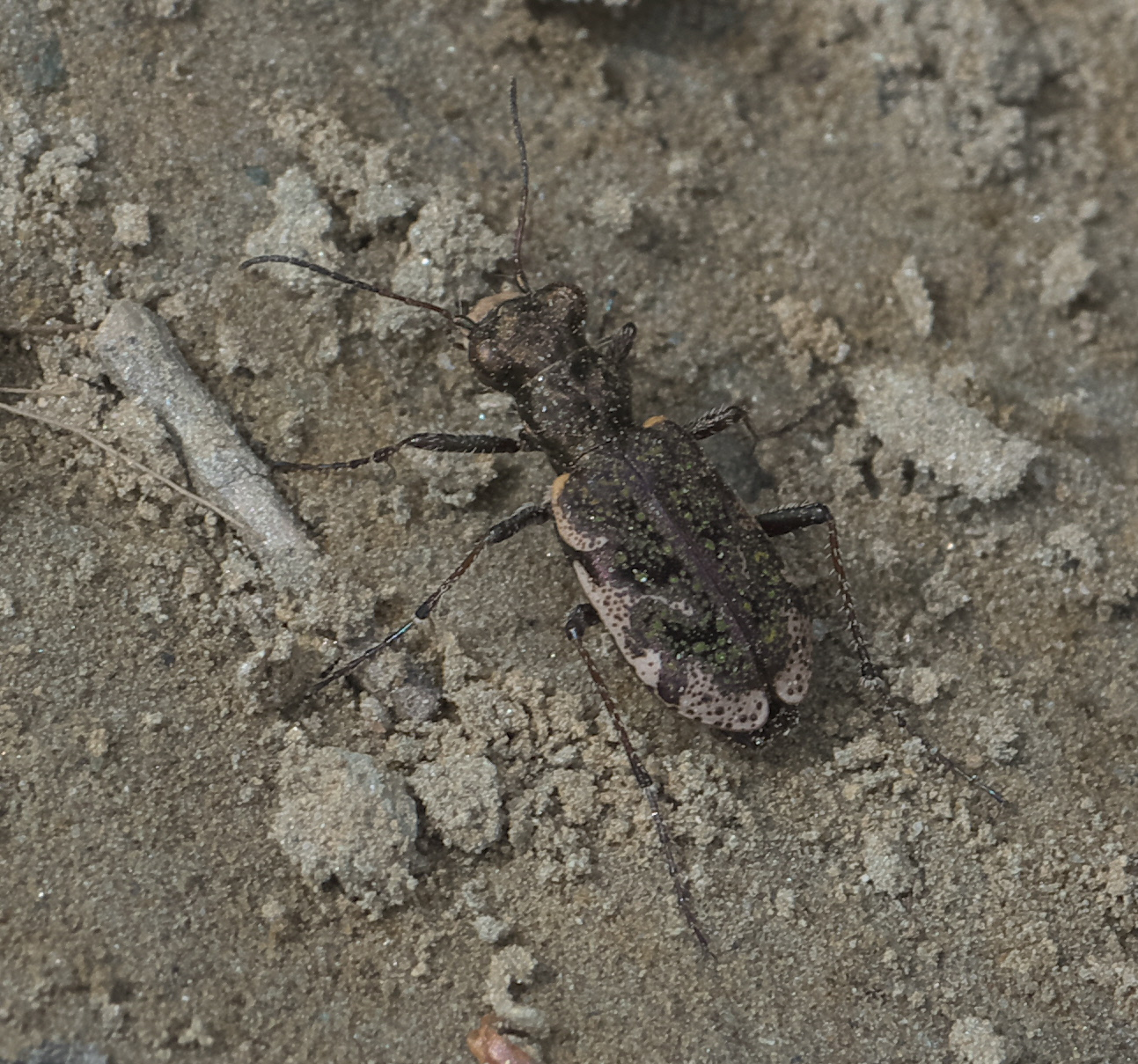

Scientific classification
- Kingdom: Animalia
- Phylum: Arthropoda
- Class: Insecta
- Order: Coleoptera
- Suborder: Adephaga
- Family: Cicindelidae
- Genus: Neocicindela
- Species: N. garnerae

Binomial name
- Neocicindela garnerae Larochelle & Larivière, 2013

= Neocicindela garnerae =

Species of beetle

Neocicindela garnerae, the South Island tiger beetle, is a species of tiger beetle in the family Cicindelidae that is endemic to the South Island of New Zealand.
