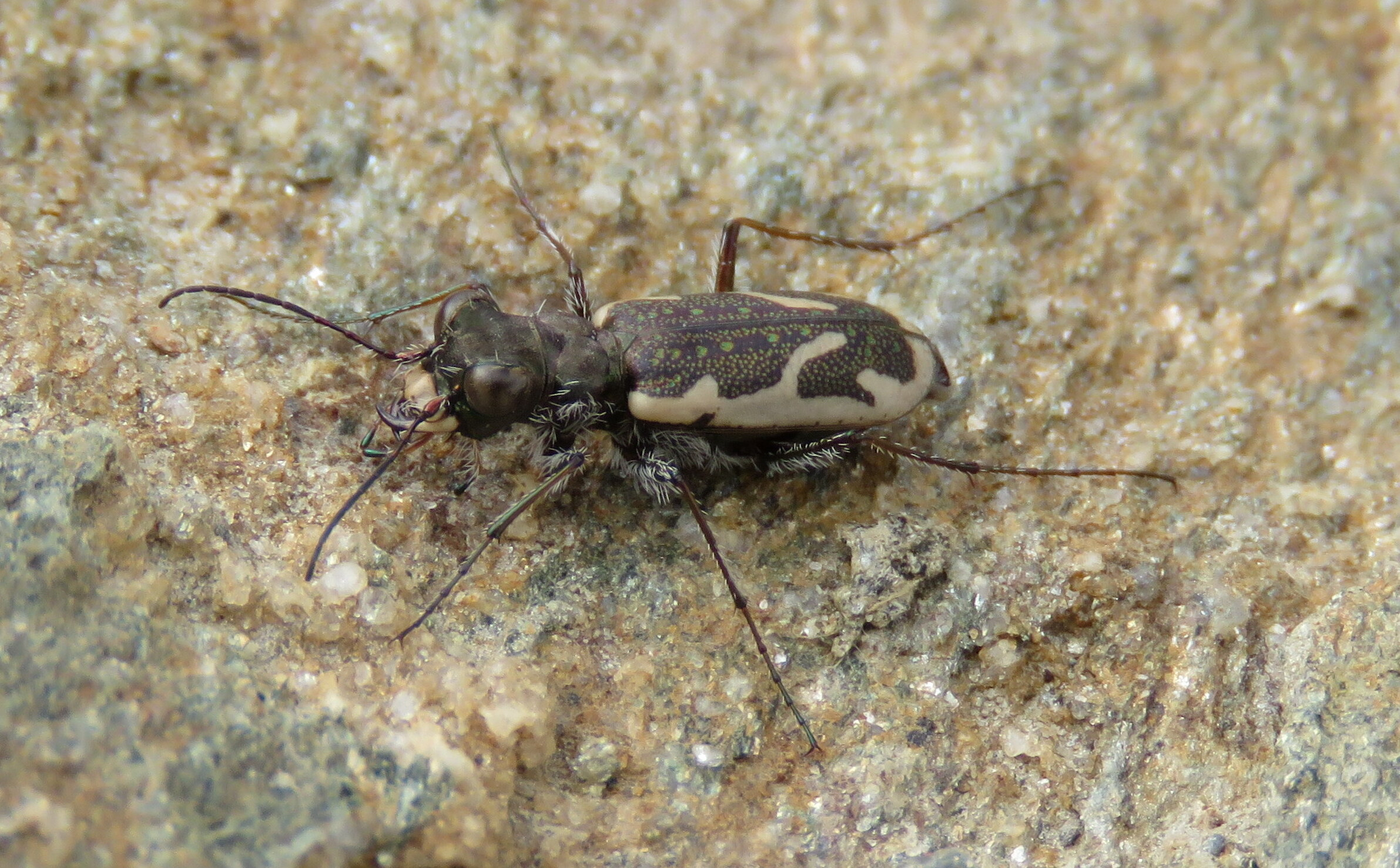
- Neocicindela dunedensis

Scientific classification
- Kingdom: Animalia
- Phylum: Arthropoda
- Class: Insecta
- Order: Coleoptera
- Suborder: Adephaga
- Family: Cicindelidae
- Tribe: Cicindelini
- Genus: Neocicindela; Rivalier, 1963

= Neocicindela =

Genus of beetles

Neocicindela is a genus of tiger beetles endemic to New Zealand. Several former species of Neocicindela have been transferred to a new genus Zecicindela. It can be separated from Zecicindela by the shape of the labrum and the absence of hairs on the clypeus, frons, genae and pronotum.

== Species ==
As of October 2024, it contains eight species, all endemic to New Zealand.

- Neocicindela aureata Johns, 2018
- Neocicindela dunedensis (Laporte, 1867)
- Neocicindela garnerae Larochelle & Larivière, 2013
- Neocicindela latecincta (White, 1846)
- Neocicindela parryi (White, 1846)
- Neocicindela spilleri Brouerius van Nidek, 1965
- Neocicindela tuberculata (Fabricius, 1775)
- Neocicindela waiouraensis (Broun, 1914)

== Gallery ==
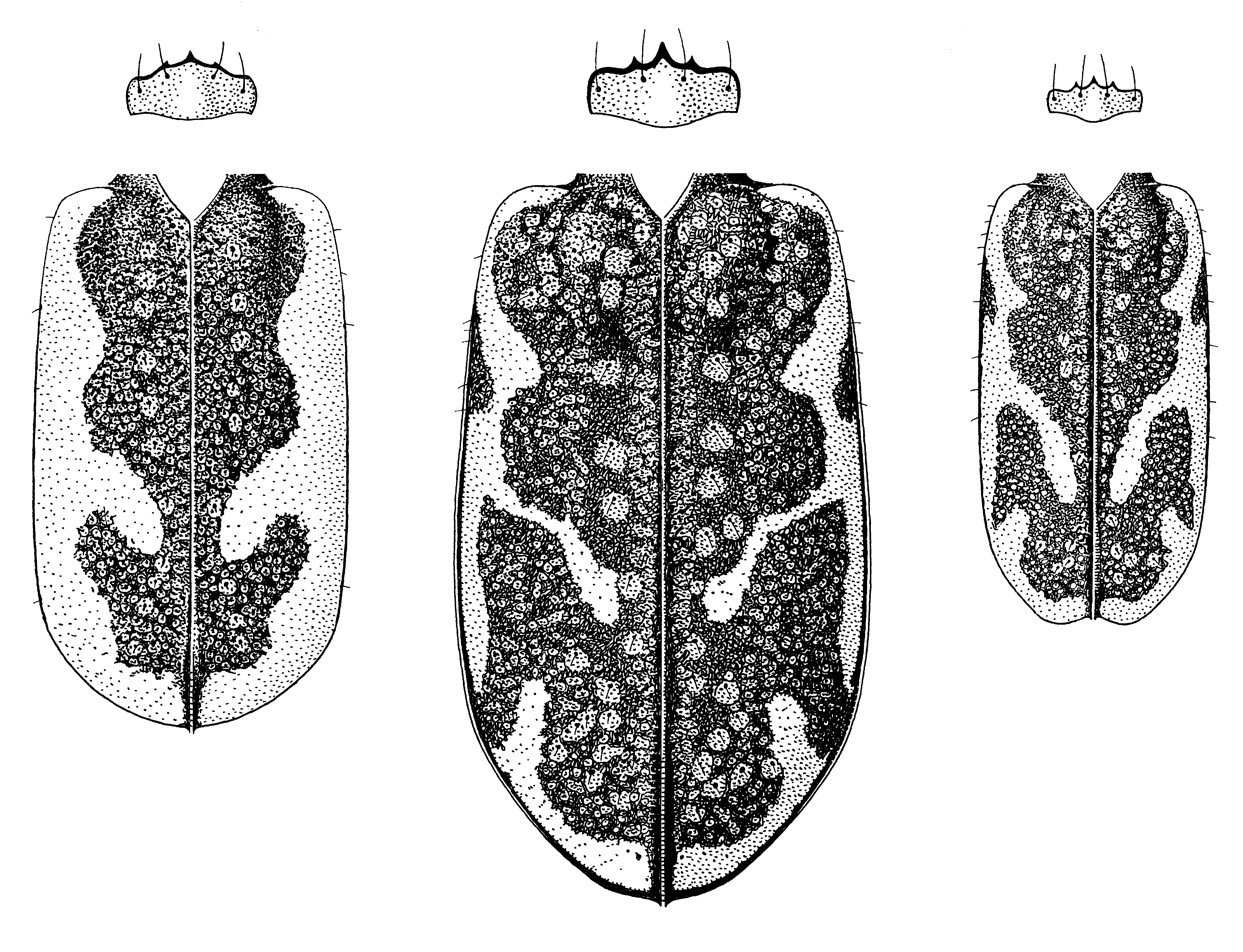
N. latecincta, adult (labrum and elytra), N. waiouraensis, adult (labrum and elytra), N. dunedensis, adult (labrum and elytra)

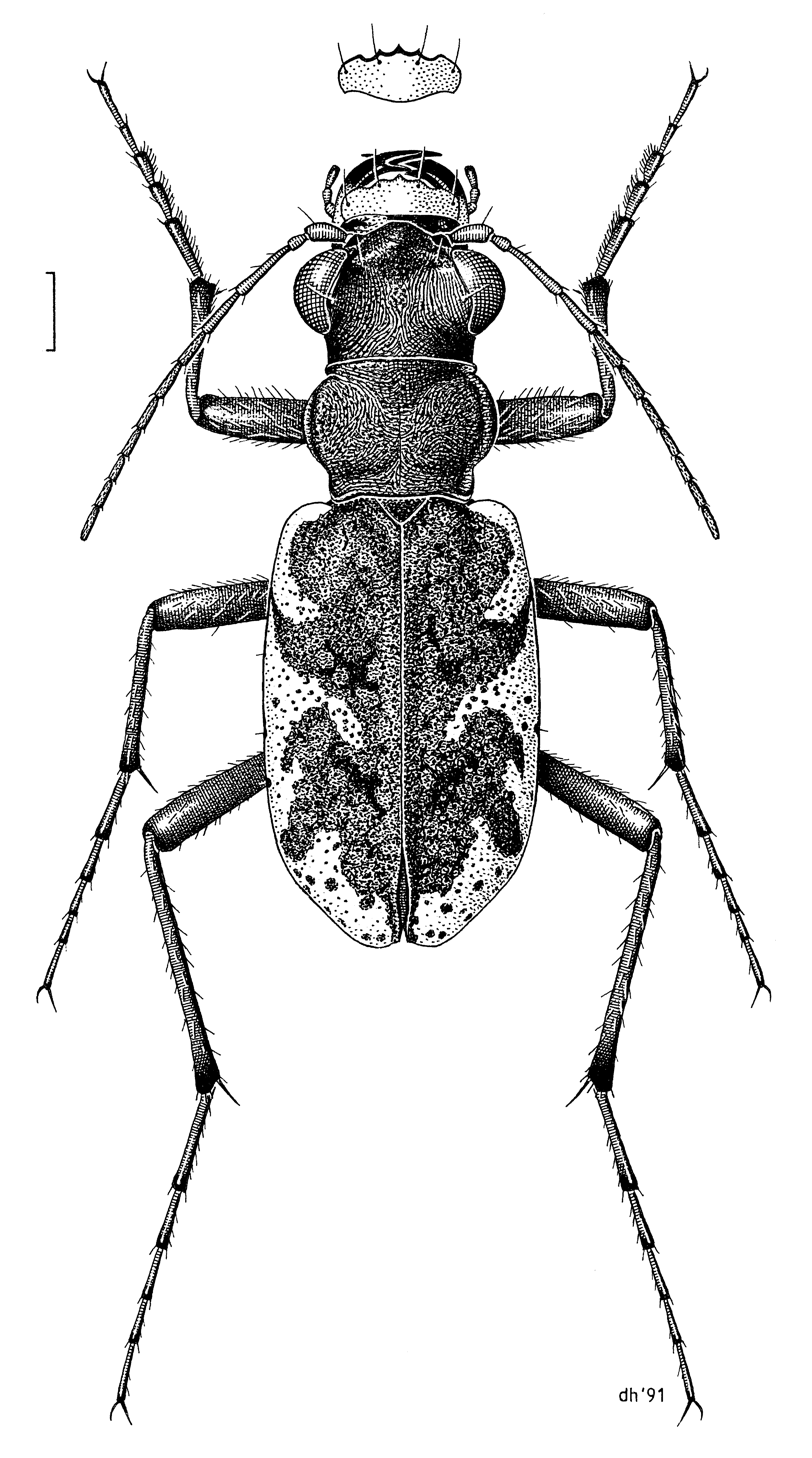
N. parryi, adult (labrum and habitus)

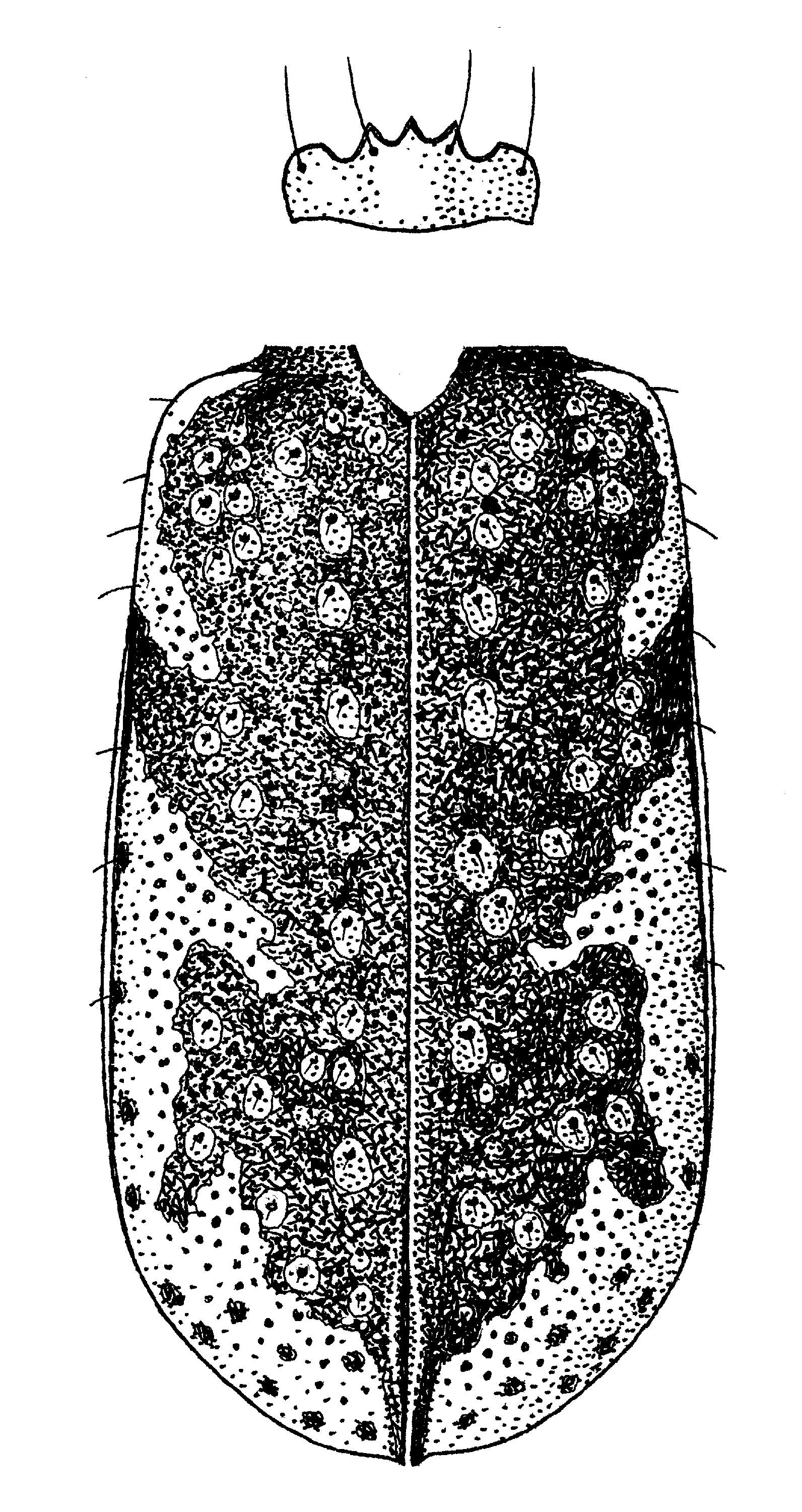
N. spilleri, adult (labrum and elytra)

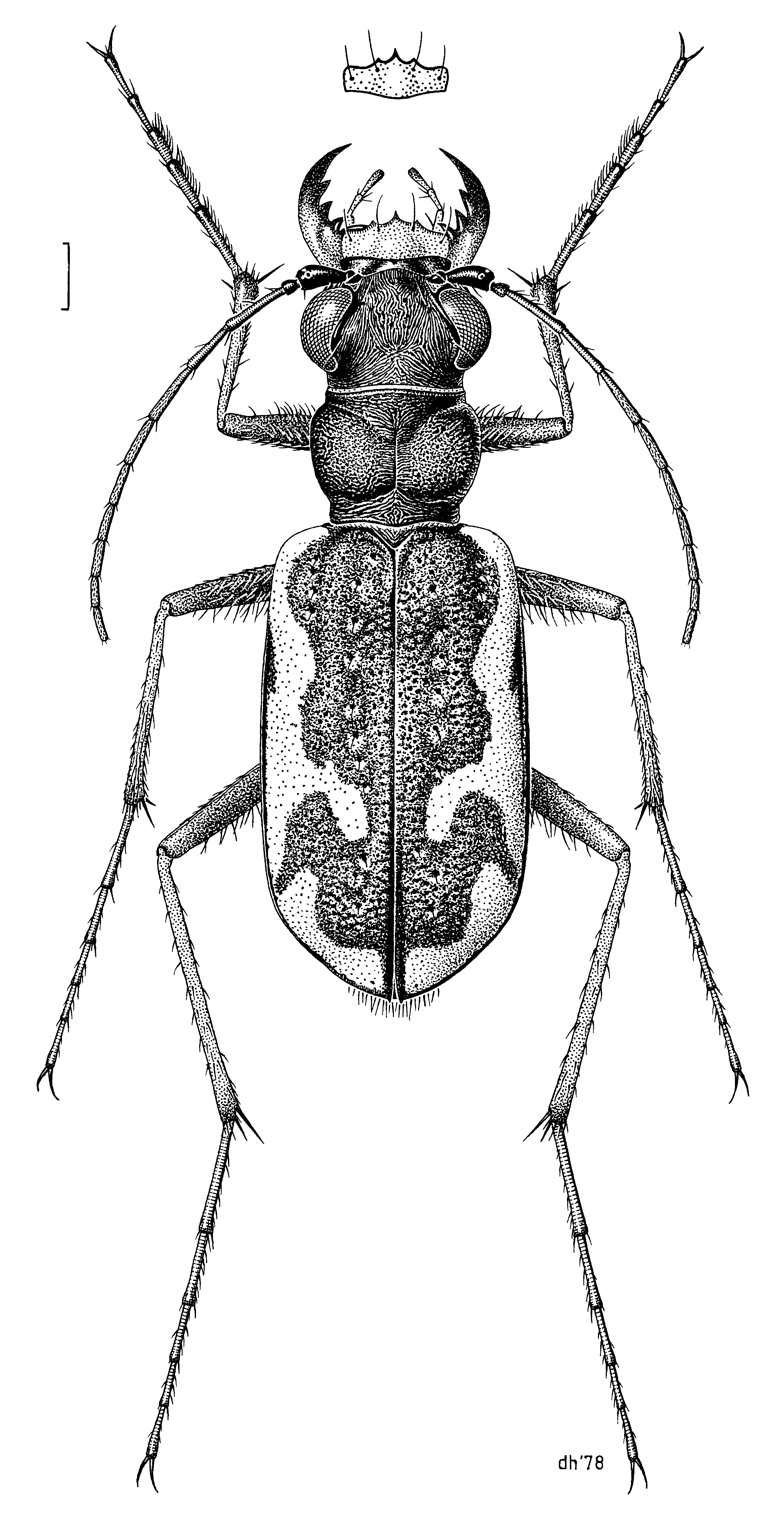
N. tuberculata, adult (labrum and habitus)
