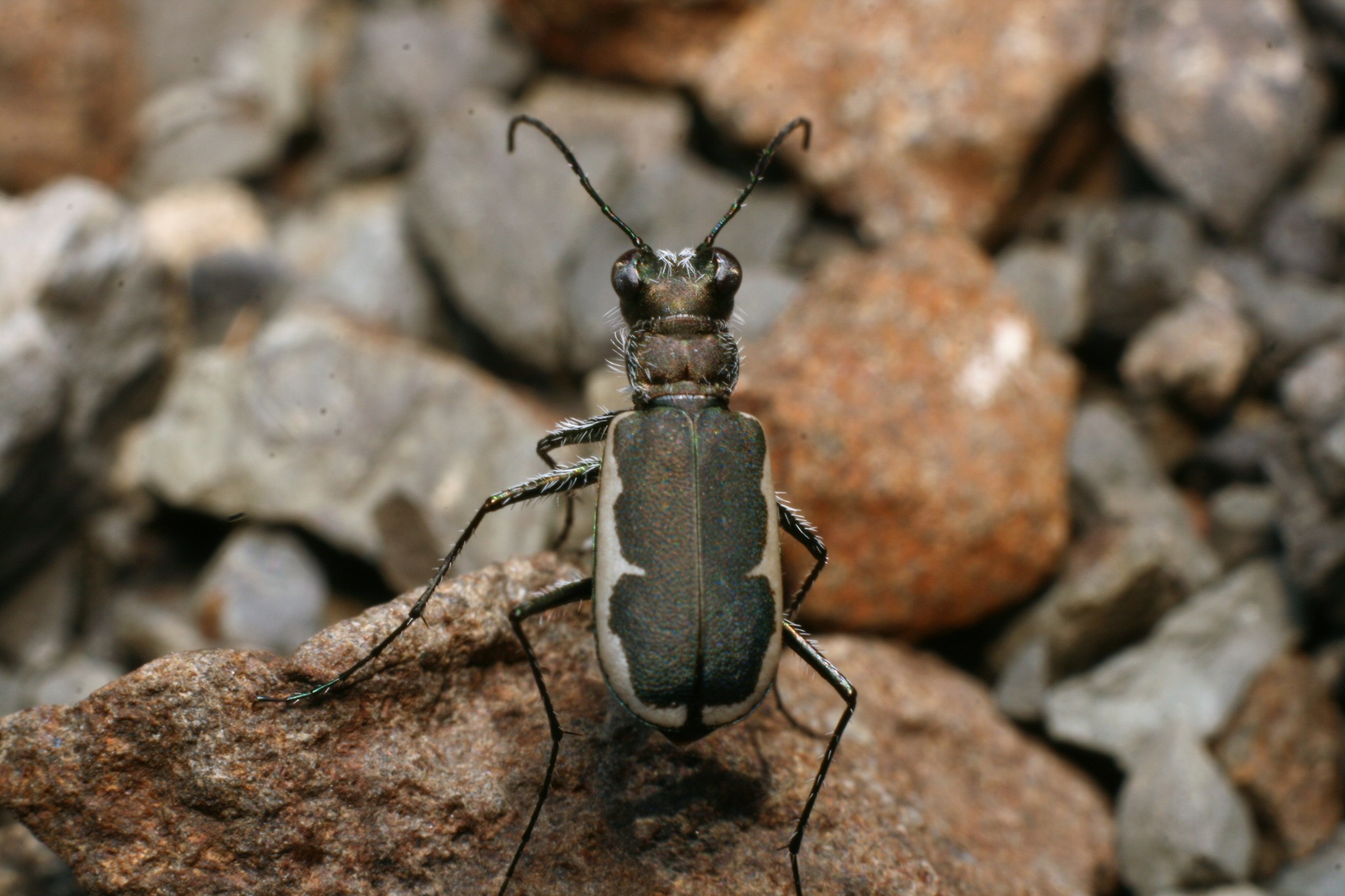

Scientific classification
- Kingdom: Animalia
- Phylum: Arthropoda
- Class: Insecta
- Order: Coleoptera
- Suborder: Adephaga
- Family: Cicindelidae
- Genus: Zecicindela
- Species: Z. hamiltoni

Binomial name
- Zecicindela hamiltoni (Broun, 1921)

Synonyms
- Cicindela hamiltoni Broun, 1921

= Zecicindela hamiltoni =

Species of beetle

Zecicindela hamiltoni is a species of tiger beetle.

== Taxonomy ==
This species was first described by Thomas Broun in 1921 and originally named Cicindela hamiltoni.

== Distribution ==
This species is endemic to New Zealand.
