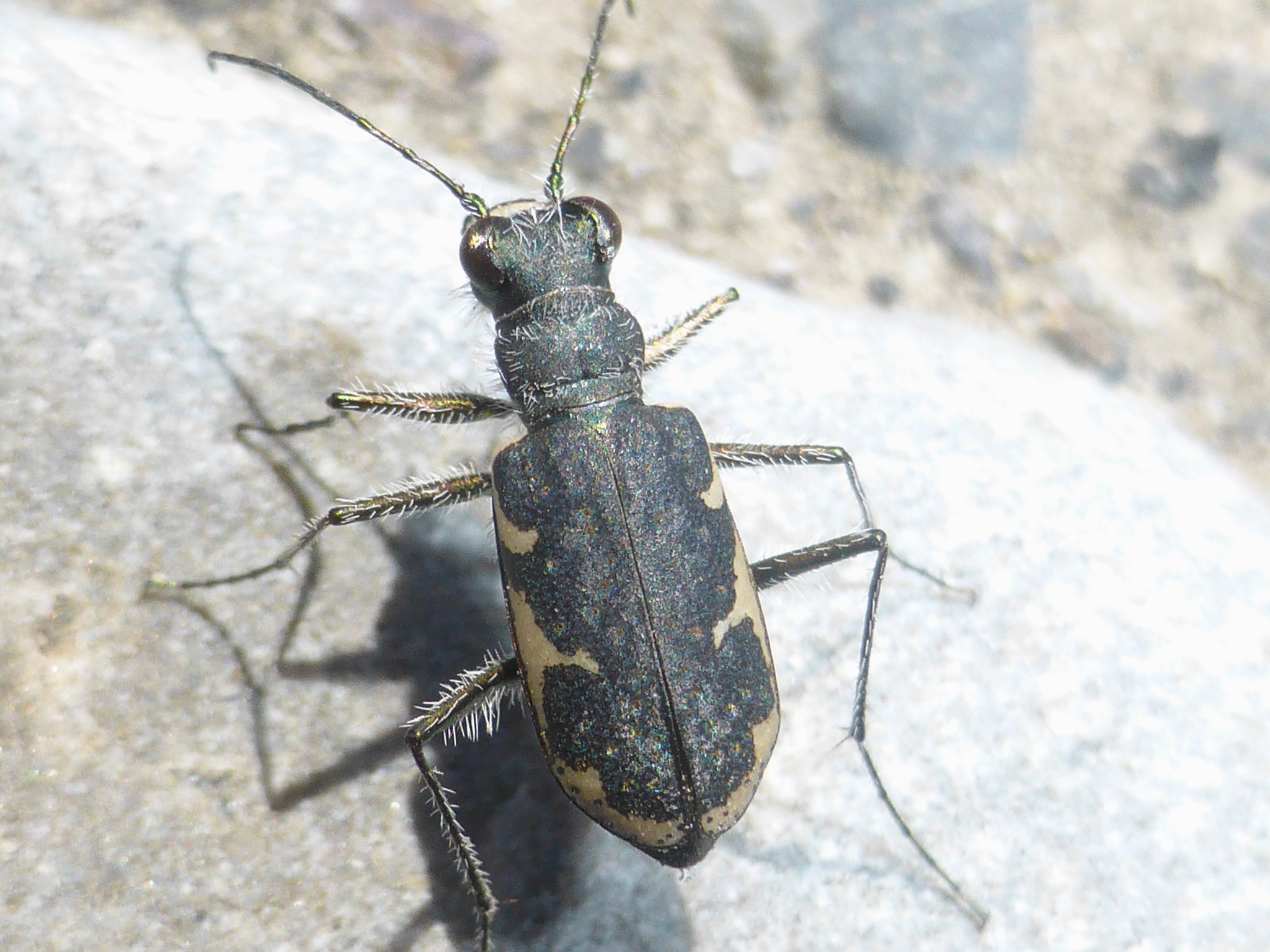

Scientific classification
- Kingdom: Animalia
- Phylum: Arthropoda
- Class: Insecta
- Order: Coleoptera
- Suborder: Adephaga
- Family: Cicindelidae
- Genus: Zecicindela
- Species: Z. helmsi

Binomial name
- Zecicindela helmsi (Sharp, 1886)

Synonyms
- Cicindela helmsi Sharp, 1886; Cicindela circumpictoides W.Horn, 1900; Cicindela halli Broun, 1917; Cicindela novaseelandica W.Horn, 1892

= Zecicindela helmsi =

Species of beetle

Zecicindela helmsi is a species of tiger beetle. This species is found in New Zealand.

== Subspecies ==
- Zecicindela helmsi helmsi
- Zecicindela helmsi circumpictoides (W.Horn, 1900)
- Zecicindela helmsi halli (Broun, 1917)
- Zecicindela helmsi novaseelandica (W.Horn, 1892)
