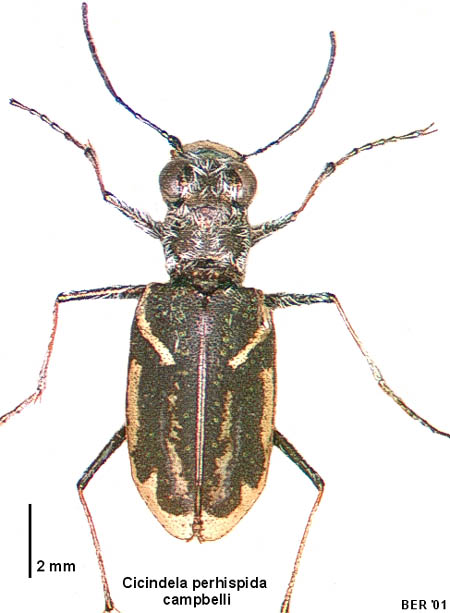

Scientific classification
- Kingdom: Animalia
- Phylum: Arthropoda
- Class: Insecta
- Order: Coleoptera
- Suborder: Adephaga
- Family: Cicindelidae
- Genus: Zecicindela
- Species: Z. campbelli

Binomial name
- Zecicindela campbelli (Broun, 1886)

Synonyms
- Cicindela campbelli Broun, 1886; Cicindela brouni W.Horn, 1893; Cicindela perhispida campbelli

= Zecicindela campbelli =

Species of beetle

Zecicindela campbelli is a species of tiger beetle in the family Cicindelidae, endemic to New Zealand. It belongs to the genus Zecicindela, which comprises ground-dwelling beetles known for their speed and predatory behaviour. The species was originally described by Thomas Broun in 1886 under the name Cicindela campbelli and was later reclassified into its current genus.
