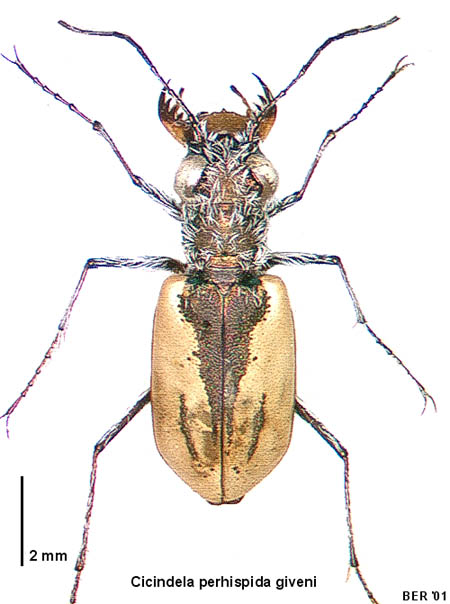

Scientific classification
- Kingdom: Animalia
- Phylum: Arthropoda
- Class: Insecta
- Order: Coleoptera
- Suborder: Adephaga
- Family: Cicindelidae
- Genus: Zecicindela
- Species: Z. giveni

Binomial name
- Zecicindela giveni (Brouerius van Nidek, 1965)

Synonyms
- Neocicindela perhispida giveni Brouerius van Nidek, 1965; Neocicindela giveni (Brouerius van Nidek, 1965); Cicindela perhispida giveni (Brouerius van Nidek, 1965)

= Zecicindela giveni =

Species of beetle

Zecicindela giveni is a species of tiger beetle. This species is found in New Zealand. Christiaan Matheus Constant Brouerius van Nidek first described this species in 1965 as a subspecies of Neocicindela perhispida.
