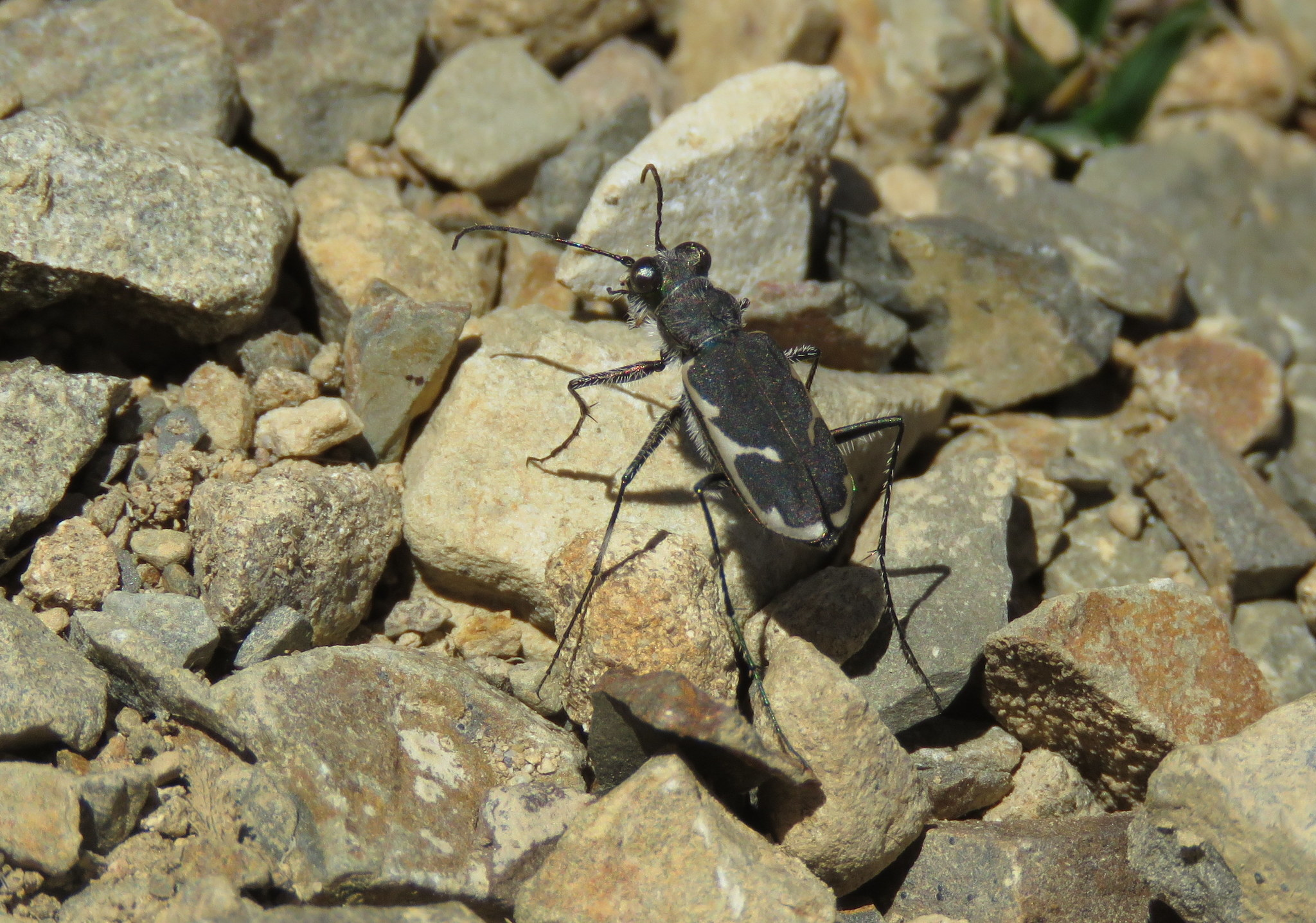

Scientific classification
- Kingdom: Animalia
- Phylum: Arthropoda
- Class: Insecta
- Order: Coleoptera
- Suborder: Adephaga
- Family: Cicindelidae
- Genus: Zecicindela
- Species: Z. austromontana

Binomial name
- Zecicindela austromontana (Bates, 1878)

Synonyms
- Cicindela austromontana Bates, 1878; Cicindela incognita W.Horn, 1892; Neocicindela austromontana (Bates, 1878); Neocicindela incognita (W.Horn, 1892); Zecicindela incognita (W.Horn, 1892)

= Zecicindela austromontana =

Species of beetle

Zecicindela austromontana is a species of tiger beetle. This species was first described by Henry Walter Bates in 1878 and originally named Cicindela austromontana. It is endemic to New Zealand.
