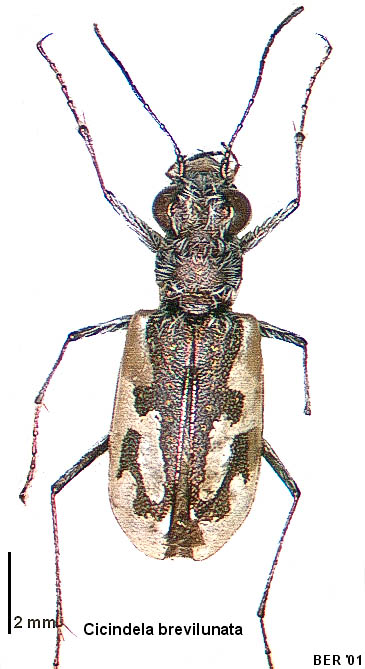

Scientific classification
- Kingdom: Animalia
- Phylum: Arthropoda
- Class: Insecta
- Order: Coleoptera
- Suborder: Adephaga
- Family: Cicindelidae
- Genus: Zecicindela
- Species: Z. brevilunata

Binomial name
- Zecicindela brevilunata (W.Horn, 1926)

Synonyms
- Cicindela brevilunata W.Horn, 1926; Neocicindela brevilunata (W.Horn, 1926)

= Zecicindela brevilunata =

Species of spider

Zecicindela brevilunata is a species of tiger beetle endemic to New Zealand.

== Taxonomy ==
This species was described as Cicindela brevilunata by Walther Hermann Richard Horn in 1926. It was most recently revised in 2013, in which it was moved to the Zecicindela genus.

== Description ==
The adults are recorded at 7.5-9.4mm in length. The head and thorax are a dull reddish in colour. The elytra is also dull reddish and has white markings dorsally. Much of the body is covered in white hairs.

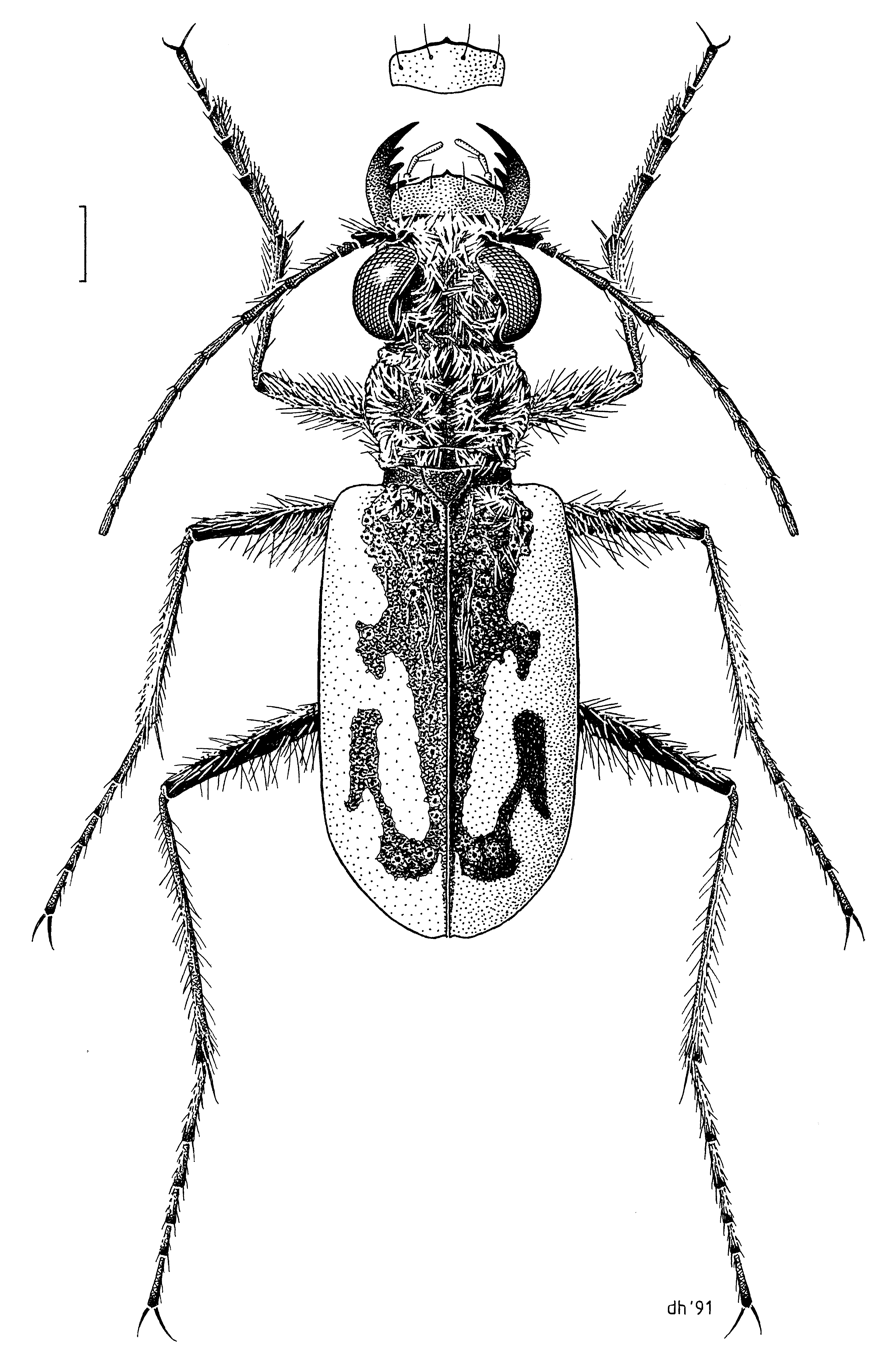
Drawing of Zecicindela brevilunata

== Distribution and habitat ==
This species is only known from the northern end New Zealand's North Island. The adults are known to occur from December to April in coastal lowland areas, typically in sandy beaches and foredunes with little vegetation.
