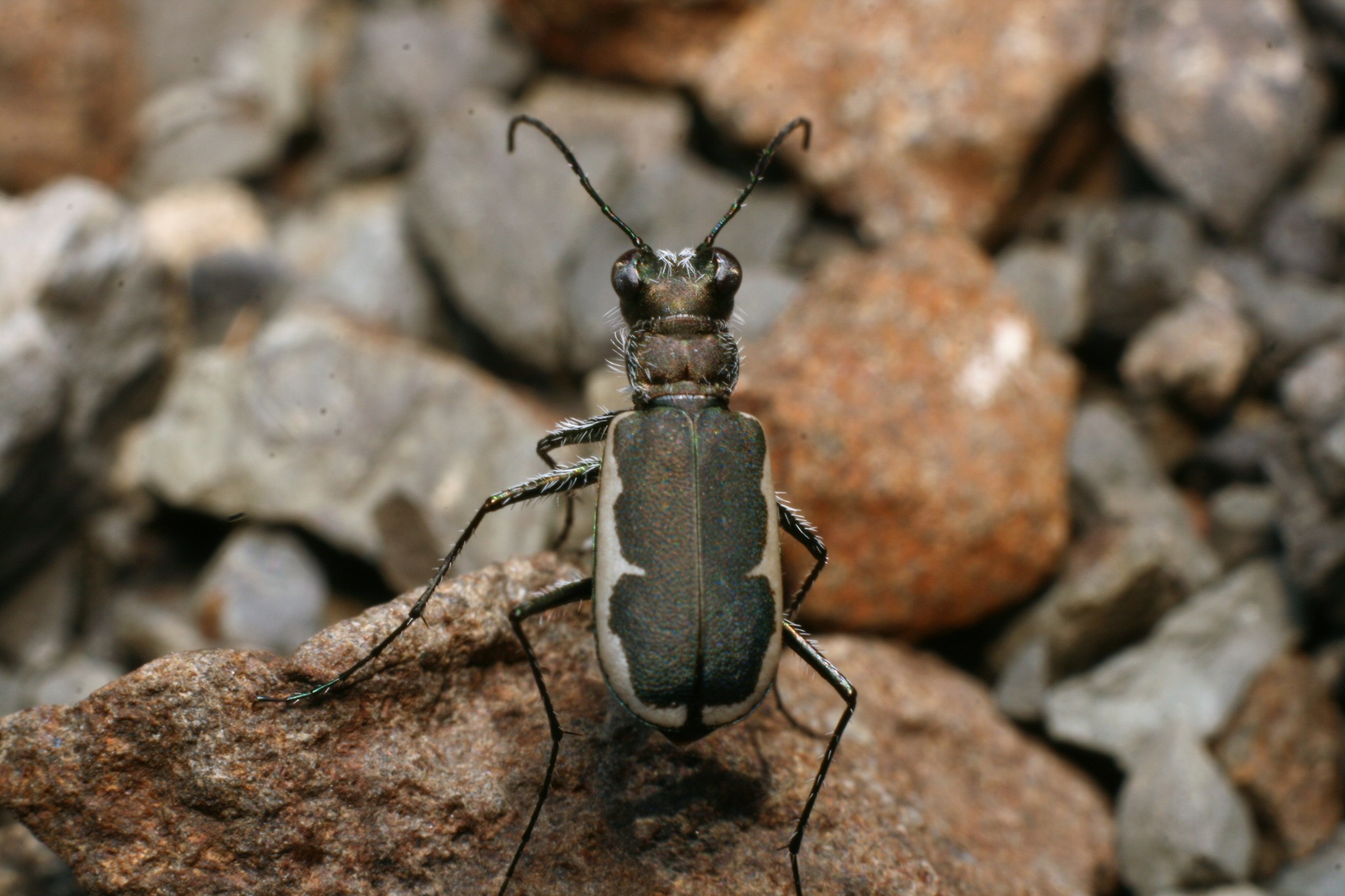
- Zecicindela hamiltoni

Scientific classification
- Domain: Eukaryota
- Kingdom: Animalia
- Phylum: Arthropoda
- Class: Insecta
- Order: Coleoptera
- Suborder: Adephaga
- Family: Cicindelidae
- Tribe: Cicindelini
- Genus: Zecicindela; Larochelle & Larivière, 2013

= Zecicindela =

Genus of beetles

Zecicindela is a genus of tiger beetles endemic to New Zealand. It is in the Cicindelini tribe, along with another New Zealand genus, Neocicindela. It is similar to Neocicindela, but can be separated by the shape of the labrum and the presence of hairs on the clypeus, frons, genae and pronotum. Zecicindela live on riverbanks and the seashore, while Neocicindela may live away from water.

== Taxonomy ==
The Zecicindela genus was created in 2013 following a 2011 genetics study which provided strong evidence that the Neocicindela genus should be split in two. The name Zecicindela is derived from "Ze-" (for "New Zealand") and "Cicindela" (the type genus of Cicindelini).

=== Phylogeny ===
Phylogeny

- - - - - - - - Zecicindela campbelli
              - Zecicindela perhispida
            - - Zecicindela brevilunata
              - Zecicindela giveni
          - - Zecicindela helmsi
            - Zecicindela helmsi
        - Zecicindela helmsi
      - Zecicindela austromontana
    - Zecicindela feredayi
  - - Zecicindela hamiltoni

A 2011 study examined the genetic relationships of New Zealand's tiger beetles. The combined sequences of cytochrome oxidase I, cytochrome b and 16S rRNA found that Zecicindela formed a clade (group of organisms that comprise all descendants of a common ancestor) that was distinct and separate from Neocicindela.

== Species ==
As of November 2024, it contains ten species, all endemic to New Zealand.

- Zecicindela austromontana (Bates, 1878)
- Zecicindela brevilunata (W.Horn, 1926)
- Zecicindela campbelli (Broun, 1886)
- Zecicindela feredayi (Bates, 1867)
- Zecicindela giveni (Brouerius van Nidek, 1965)
- Zecicindela hamiltoni (Broun, 1921)
- Zecicindela helmsi (Sharp, 1886)
- Zecicindela perhispida (Broun, 1880)
- Zecicindela savilli (Wiesner, 1988)
- Zecicindela tekapoensis Emberson & Syrett & Blakely, 2018
