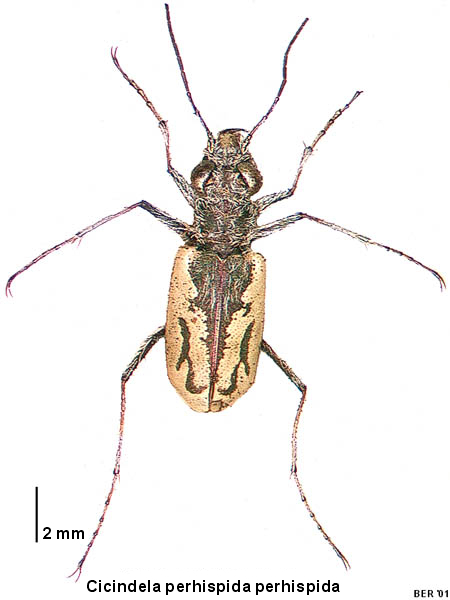

Scientific classification
- Kingdom: Animalia
- Phylum: Arthropoda
- Class: Insecta
- Order: Coleoptera
- Suborder: Adephaga
- Family: Cicindelidae
- Genus: Zecicindela
- Species: Z. perhispida

Binomial name
- Zecicindela perhispida (Broun, 1880)

Synonyms
- Cicindela perhispida Broun, 1880; Neocicindela perhispida

= Zecicindela perhispida =

Species of beetle

Zecicindela perhispida is a species of tiger beetle endemic to New Zealand.

== Taxonomy ==
This species was described as Cicindela perhispida in 1880 by Thomas Broun from specimens collected in Northland. It was most recently revised in 2013, in which it was moved to the Zecicindela genus.

== Description ==
The adult is recorded at 8.5 - 10.3mm in length. The head and thorax are greenish bronze. The abdomen is also greenish bronze with large yellow white markings that occupy most of the abdomen dorsally. Much of the body is covered in white hairs. The colouration of the abdomen helps the beetle camouflage on yellow sands.

== Distribution ==
This species is only known from Auckland and Northland in New Zealand. The adults are known to occur November to February. They typically occur in coastal lowland areas on yellowish beach and dune sand.
