= Zecicindela tekapoensis =

Scientific classification
- Kingdom: Animalia
- Phylum: Arthropoda
- Class: Insecta
- Order: Coleoptera
- Suborder: Adephaga
- Family: Cicindelidae
- Genus: Zecicindela
- Species: Z. tekapoensis

Binomial name
- Zecicindela tekapoensis Emberson, Syrett & Blakely, 2018

Species of beetle

Zecicindela tekapoensis is a species of tiger beetle first described in 2018. This species is endemic to New Zealand, where it was first recorded in the South Island in Canterbury from the Mackenzie Basin in the Mackenzie District, approximately 0.5km from the Tekapo River, where three individuals were collected. In 2019, six additional specimens were collected in pitfall traps, and one by hand, at the Simons Pass Dryland Reserve in the Mackenzie District on Tekapo and Pukaki river flats. It has been suggested that the population of Zecicindela tekapoensis may consist of fewer than 250 mature individuals within the known range that spans less than 1000 hectares. The threat status of Zecicindela tekapoensis has not been evaluated within the New Zealand Threat Classification System. Other New Zealand Zecicindela species are generally diurnal and ground-dwelling, sheltering under rocks and in holes on overcast days. The larvae of other New Zealand Zecicindela species occupy sunny clay banks.

== Habitat ==
Zecicindela tekapoensis individuals have been collected from flat, open, stony fields, where vegetation is sparse and dominated by shrubby herbs (Rosa rubiginosa, Styphelia nesophila, Muehlenbeckia axillaris, Carex breviculmis, Hypericum perforatum, Pilosella officinarum, and Anthoxanthum odoratum). Zecicindela tekapoensis has not been caught in nearby degraded tussock lands or areas dominated by exotic pasture grasses. The site where individuals have been found is described as very dry.

== Morphology ==
Zecicindela tekapoensis possesses a distinctive tridentate anterior labral margin, with three tooth-like projections arising from the frontal edge of the labrum, or upper lip. Zecicindela tekapoensis also uniquely presents with a narrow marginal line on the elytra, in addition to an almost linear, narrow remnant of the middle band, which distinguishes it from other species in the genus Zecicindela. The body length of one male (8.9mm) and two females (10.1mm to 10.2mm) has been recorded. The head, thorax and elytra are dark green in colouration. The elytra have plain creamy white markings. On the underside, Zecicindela tekapoensis is black, and the abdomen sternites and legs are glossy. White setae are present on the head, thorax, abdomen, femora, the first three tarsomeres, and elytra.
