= List of Oberonia species =

Oberonia is a genus of about 266 species of flowering plants in the orchid family, Orchidaceae. The following is a list of Oberonia species accepted by Plants of the World Online as at October 2025.

- Oberonia acarus Evrard ex Gagnep.
- Oberonia acaulis Griff.
  - Oberonia acaulis var. acaulis
  - Oberonia acaulis var. luchunensis S.C.Chen
- Oberonia agamensis J.J.Sm.
- Oberonia agastyamalayana C.S.Kumar
- Oberonia alopecurus Schltr.
- Oberonia anamalayana J.Joseph
- Oberonia anguina Schltr.
- Oberonia angustifolia Lindl.
- Oberonia anthropophora Lindl.
- Oberonia aporophylla Rchb.f.
- Oberonia arcuata Schltr.
- Oberonia arisanensis Hayata
- Oberonia arunachalensis A.N.Rao
- Oberonia attenuata Dockrill – Mossman fairy orchid (Australia)
- Oberonia aureolabris D.L.Geiger
- Oberonia balakrishnanii R.Ansari
- Oberonia bantaengensis J.J.Sm.
- Oberonia batuensis J.J.Sm.
- Oberonia beccarii Finet
- Oberonia bellii Blatt. & McCann
- Oberonia benguetensis Ames
- Oberonia bertoldii King & Pantl.
- Oberonia betongensis Kerr
- Oberonia bicornis Lindl.
- Oberonia bifida Schltr.
  - Oberonia bifida var. bifida
  - Oberonia bifida var. brachyloba Schltr.
- Oberonia bilobata Schltr.
- Oberonia boerlageana J.J.Sm.
- Oberonia bopannae Chowlu & Kumar
- Oberonia borneensis Schltr.
- Oberonia bougainvilleana Ormerod
- Oberonia brachystachys Lindl.
- Oberonia brevispica Schltr.
- Oberonia brunnea Schltr.
- Oberonia brunoniana Wight
- Oberonia calcarea P.O'Byrne
- Oberonia cardiochila Schltr
- Oberonia carnosa Lavarack – rockpile fairy orchid (Australia)
- Oberonia cathayana Chun & Tang
- Oberonia caulescens Lindl.
- Oberonia cavaleriei Finet
- Oberonia chandrasekharanii V.J.Nair, V.S.Ramach. & R.Ansari
- Oberonia celebica Schltr.
- Oberonia chandrasekharanii V.J.Nair, V.S.Ramach. & R.Ansari
- Oberonia cirrhifera J.J.Sm.
- Oberonia claviloba Jayaw.
- Oberonia cleistogama Schltr.
- Oberonia complanata (A.Cunn.) M.A.Clem. & D.L.Jones – southern green fairy orchid (Australia)
- Oberonia cordata Schltr.
- Oberonia costeriana J.J.Sm.
- Oberonia cryptantha Schltr.
- Oberonia cuneata J.J.Sm.
- Oberonia cylindrica Lindl.
- Oberonia delacourii Gagnep.
- Oberonia dimorphophylla J.J.Sm.
- Oberonia dissitiflora Ridl.
- Oberonia disticha (Lam.) Schltr.
- Oberonia diura Schltr.
- Oberonia djamuensis Schltr.
- Oberonia djongkongensis J.J.Sm.
- Oberonia dolabrata Jayaw.
- Oberonia drepanophylla Schltr.
- Oberonia dubia J.J.Sm.
- Oberonia elegans Schltr.
- Oberonia elongata Ridl.
- Oberonia emarginata King & Pantl.
- Oberonia ensifolia J.B.Comber
- Oberonia ensiformis (Sm.) Lindl.
- Oberonia equitans (G.Forst.) Mutel
- Oberonia exaltata Schltr.
- Oberonia falcifolia Schltr.
- Oberonia falconeri Hook.f.
- Oberonia fallax J.J.Sm.
- Oberonia ferruginea C.S.P.Parish ex Hook.f.
- Oberonia filaris Ridl.
- Oberonia finisterrae Schltr.
- Oberonia fissipetala Mansf.
- Oberonia flavescens D.L.Jones & M.A.Clem. – northern green fairy orchid (Australia)
- Oberonia forcipata Lindl.
- Oberonia formosana Hayata
- Oberonia fornicata Jayaw.
- Oberonia fungumolens Burkill
- Oberonia gammiei King & Pantl.
- Oberonia glandulifera Ridl.
- Oberonia gongshanensis Ormerod
- Oberonia govidjoae Schltr.
- Oberonia gracilipes Schltr.
- Oberonia gracilis Hook.f.
- Oberonia grandis Ridl.
- Oberonia griffithiana Lindl.
- Oberonia hamadryas Ridl.
- Oberonia hastata Schltr.
- Oberonia helferi Hook.f.
- Oberonia heliophila Rchb.f.
- Oberonia hexaptera F.Muell.
- Oberonia hosei Rendle
- Oberonia hosseusii Schltr.
- Oberonia huensis Aver.
- Oberonia × hybrida Schltr.
- Oberonia imbricata (Blume) Lindl.
- Oberonia insectifera Hook.f.
- Oberonia insularis Hayata
- Oberonia integrilabris Yu L.Li & F.W.Xing
- Oberonia intermedia King & Pantl.
- Oberonia irrorata Schltr.
- Oberonia japonica (Maxim.) Makino
- Oberonia jenkinsiana Griff. ex Lindl.
- Oberonia jhae Chowlu & K.S.Rab
- Oberonia josephi C.J.Saldanha
- Oberonia kaernbachiana Kraenzl.
- Oberonia kaniensis Schltr.
- Oberonia kempfii Schltr.
- Oberonia kempteri Schltr.
- Oberonia kingii Lucksom
- Oberonia klossii Ridl.
- Oberonia kwangsiensis Seidenf.
- Oberonia labidoglossa Schltr.
- Oberonia lancipetala Schltr.
- Oberonia langbianensis Gagnep.
- Oberonia latifii J.J.Sm.
- Oberonia latilabris Schltr.
- Oberonia latipetala L.O.Williams
- Oberonia laxa Schltr.
- Oberonia ledermannii Schltr.
- Oberonia leytensis Ames
- Oberonia linearifolia Ames
- Oberonia linearis Schltr.
  - Oberonia linearis var. brevipetala J.J.Sm.
  - Oberonia linearis var. linearis
- Oberonia linguae T.P.Lin & Y.N.Chang
- Oberonia lipensis Ames
- Oberonia lobbiana Lindl.
- Oberonia lobulata King & Pantl.
- Oberonia longhutensis J.J.Sm.
- Oberonia longibracteata Lindl.
- Oberonia longicaulis Schltr.
- Oberonia longilabris King & Pantl.
- Oberonia longispica Schltr.
- Oberonia longitepala J.J.Wood
- Oberonia lotsyana J.J.Sm.
- Oberonia lucida J.J.Sm.
- Oberonia lunata (Blume) Lindl.
- Oberonia luzonensis Ames
- Oberonia lycopodioides (J.Koenig) Ormerod
- Oberonia maboroensis Schltr.
- Oberonia macrostachys Ridl.
- Oberonia mahaeliyensis C.Bandara, Lakkana & Edir.
- Oberonia mahawoensis Schltr.
- Oberonia mannii Hook.f.
- Oberonia marginata Ridl.
- Oberonia marina J.B.Comber
- Oberonia marnkuliensis Shreyas & Kotresha
- Oberonia masarangica Schltr.
- Oberonia maxima C.S.P.Parish ex Hook.f.
- Oberonia meegaskumburae Priyad., Wijew. & Kumar
- Oberonia melinantha Schltr.
- Oberonia menglaensis S.C.Chen & Z.H.Tsi
- Oberonia merapiensis Schltr.
- Oberonia merrillii Ames
- Oberonia microphylla (Blume) Lindl.
- Oberonia microtatantha Schltr.
- Oberonia mindorensis Ames
- Oberonia miniata Lindl.
- Oberonia minima Ames
- Oberonia minutissima Ames
- Oberonia monstruosa (Blume) Lindl.
  - Oberonia monstruosa var. monstruosa
  - Oberonia monstruosa var. seramica J.J.Sm.
- Oberonia mucronata (D.Don) Ormerod
- Oberonia multiflora Ridl.
- Oberonia muriculata Schltr.
- Oberonia muthikulamensis K.Prasad, K.M.P.Kumar & P.Sudheshna
- Oberonia nayarii R.Ansari & N.P.Balakr.
- Oberonia neglecta Schltr.
- Oberonia nephroglossa Schltr.
- Oberonia ngoclinhensis Aver.
- Oberonia obcordata Lindl.
- Oberonia oblonga R.S.Rogers
- Oberonia odoardi Schltr.
- Oberonia oligotricha Schltr.
- Oberonia orbicularis Hook.f.
- Oberonia ovalis Schltr.
- Oberonia pachyambon Schltr.
- Oberonia pachyphylla King & Pantl.
- Oberonia pachyrachis Rchb.f. ex Hook.f.
- Oberonia pachystachya Lindl.
- Oberonia padangensis Schltr.
- Oberonia pallideflava Schltr.
- Oberonia papillosa Schltr.
- Oberonia pauzii P.T.Ong & P.O'Byrne
- Oberonia pedicellata J.J.Sm.
- Oberonia phleoides Schltr.
- Oberonia platycaulon Wight
- Oberonia platychila Schltr.
- Oberonia pleistophylla Schltr.
- Oberonia plumea J.J.Sm.
- Oberonia podostachys Schltr.
- Oberonia potamophila Schltr.
- Oberonia prainiana King & Pantl.
- Oberonia proudlockii King & Pantl.
- Oberonia pumilio Rchb.f.
- Oberonia punamensis Schltr.
- Oberonia punctata J.J.Sm.
- Oberonia pygmaea Bunpha, H.A.Pedersen & Sridith
- Oberonia pyrulifera Lindl.
- Oberonia quadrata Schltr.
- Oberonia quadrilatera Jayaw.
- Oberonia radicans Schltr.
- Oberonia reilloi Ames
- Oberonia repens Schltr.
- Oberonia reversidens J.J.Sm.
- Oberonia rhizoides Aver.
- Oberonia rhizomatosa J.J.Sm.
- Oberonia rhodostachys Schltr.
- Oberonia ritaii King & Pantl.
- Oberonia rotunda Hosok.
- Oberonia ruberrima Schltr.
- Oberonia rubra Ridl.
- Oberonia rufilabris Lindl.
- Oberonia sarawakensis Schltr.
- Oberonia sarcophylla Schltr.
- Oberonia scapigera Schltr.
- Oberonia scyllae Lindl.
- Oberonia scytophylla Schltr.
- Oberonia sebastiana B.V.Shetty & Vivek.
- Oberonia segawae T.C.Hsu & S.W.Chung
- Oberonia seidenfadeniana J.Joseph & Vajr.
- Oberonia seidenfadenii (H.J.Su) Ormerod
- Oberonia semifimbriata J.J.Sm.
- Oberonia seranica J.J.Sm.
- Oberonia serpentinicaulis J.J.Sm.
- Oberonia serrulata Schltr.
- Oberonia setigera Ames
- Oberonia similipalensis S.Misra
- Oberonia similis (Blume) Lindl.
- Oberonia simplex Aver.
- Oberonia singalangensis Schltr.
- Oberonia sinuata Aver.
- Oberonia sinuosa Ridl.
- Oberonia sonlaensis Aver.
- Oberonia spathipetala J.J.Sm.
- Oberonia subligaculifera J.J.Sm.
- Oberonia suborbicularis Carr
- Oberonia sumatrensis Ridl.
- Oberonia surigaensis Ames
- Oberonia swaminathanii Ratheesh, Manudev & Sujanapal
- Oberonia tahitensis Lindl.
- Oberonia tatianae Aver.
- Oberonia teres Kerr
- Oberonia thomsenii J.J.Sm.
- Oberonia thwaitesii Hook.f.
- Oberonia titania Lindl.
- Oberonia tixieri Guillaumin
- Oberonia tjisokanensis J.J.Sm.
- Oberonia tomohonensis Schltr.
- Oberonia torricellensis Schltr.
- Oberonia transversiloba Holttum
- Oberonia triangularis Ames & C.Schweinf.
- Oberonia trichophora Aver.
- Oberonia truncata Lindl.
- Oberonia truncatiglossa P.Royen
- Oberonia urostachya Schltr.
- Oberonia valetoniana J.J.Sm.
- Oberonia variabilis Kerr
- Oberonia verticillata Wight
- Oberonia vieillardii (Rchb.f.) M.A.Clem. & D.L.Jones
- Oberonia volucris Schltr.
- Oberonia wallie-silvae Jayaw.
- Oberonia wappeana J.J.Sm.
- Oberonia watuwilensis J.J.Sm.
- Oberonia weragamaensis Jayaw.
- Oberonia werneri Schltr.
- Oberonia wightiana Lindl.
- Oberonia wynadensis Sivad. & R.T.Balakr.
- Oberonia zeylanica Hook.f.
- Oberonia zimmermanniana J.J.Sm.
