= List of Nature Conservation Act extinct in the wild flora of Queensland =

This is a list of the flora of Queensland listed as Extinct in the Wild (formerly Presumed Extinct) under the Nature Conservation Act 1992. It has been updated to include the 2020 list under the Nature Conservation (Plants) Regulation 2020.

- Acianthus ledwardii
- Amphibromus whitei
- Argyreia soutteri
- Didymoglossum exiguum
- Dimocarpus leichhardtii
- Diplocaulobium masonii
- Haplopteris dareicarpa
- Huperzia serrata
- Hymenophyllum lobbii
- Lemmaphyllum accedens
- Lindsaea pulchella var. blanda
- Lycopodium volubile
- Marsdenia araujacea
- Monogramma dareicarpa
- Musa fitzalanii
- Oberonia attenuata
- Oldenlandia tenelliflora var. papuana
- Paspalum batianoffii
- Persoonia prostrata
- Prostanthera albohirta
- Pseudodiphasium volubile
- Tapeinosperma flueckigeri
- Tmesipteris lanceolata
- Trichomanes exiguum

== Formerly considered extinct ==
A list of species which were once thought to be extinct, but re-discovered in the wild:

- Amblovenatum immersum (syn. Amphineuron immersum)
- Antrophyum austroqueenslandicum
- Corchorus thozetii
- Embelia flueckigeri
- Goodenia arenicola
- Hymenophyllum whitei
- Ptilotus senarius
- Prostanthera albohirta
- Teucrium ajugaceum
- Rhaphidospora cavernarum
- Wendlandia psychotrioides
