= Oberonia carnosa =

Rockpile fairy orchid

Scientific classification
- Kingdom: Plantae
- Clade: Tracheophytes
- Clade: Angiosperms
- Clade: Monocots
- Order: Asparagales
- Family: Orchidaceae
- Subfamily: Epidendroideae
- Genus: Oberonia
- Species: O. carnosa

Binomial name
- Oberonia carnosa Lavarack

Species of orchid

Oberonia carnosa, commonly known as the rockpile fairy orchid, is a plant in the orchid family and is a clump-forming epiphyte. It has between four and six leaves in a fan-like arrangement and large numbers of tiny orange brown flowers arranged in whorls around the flowering stem.

== Description ==
Oberonia carnosa is an epiphytic or lithophytic herb with between four and six fleshy, light green leaves 15–25 mm (0.59–0.98 in) long, 5–8 mm (0.20–0.31 in) wide and curved with their bases overlapping. A large number of orange to orange brown flowers about 1.7 mm (0.067 in) long and 1.0 mm (0.039 in) wide are arranged in whorls on an arching or hanging flowering stem 30–60 mm (1.2–2.4 in) long. The flowering stem has whorls of tiny bracts near its base. The sepals and petals are egg-shaped and spread widely apart from each other, the petals with teeth on their edges and the sepals curved backwards. The labellum is about 1 mm (0.039 in) long and 0.6 mm (0.024 in) wide with three obscure lobes that often have teeth on the tip. Flowering occurs between February and June.

== Taxonomy and naming ==
Oberonia carnosa was first formally described in 1977 by Bill Lavarack who published the description in the journal Austrobaileya from a specimen he collected from Tozer's Gap on Cape York Peninsula. The specific epithet (carnosa) is a Latin word meaning "fleshy".

== Distribution and habitat ==
The rockpile fairy orchid grows on trees in sparse scrub in humid places and on trees and boulders in an area of large boulders known as "The Rockpiles". It is found between the Iron and McIlwraith Ranges.
