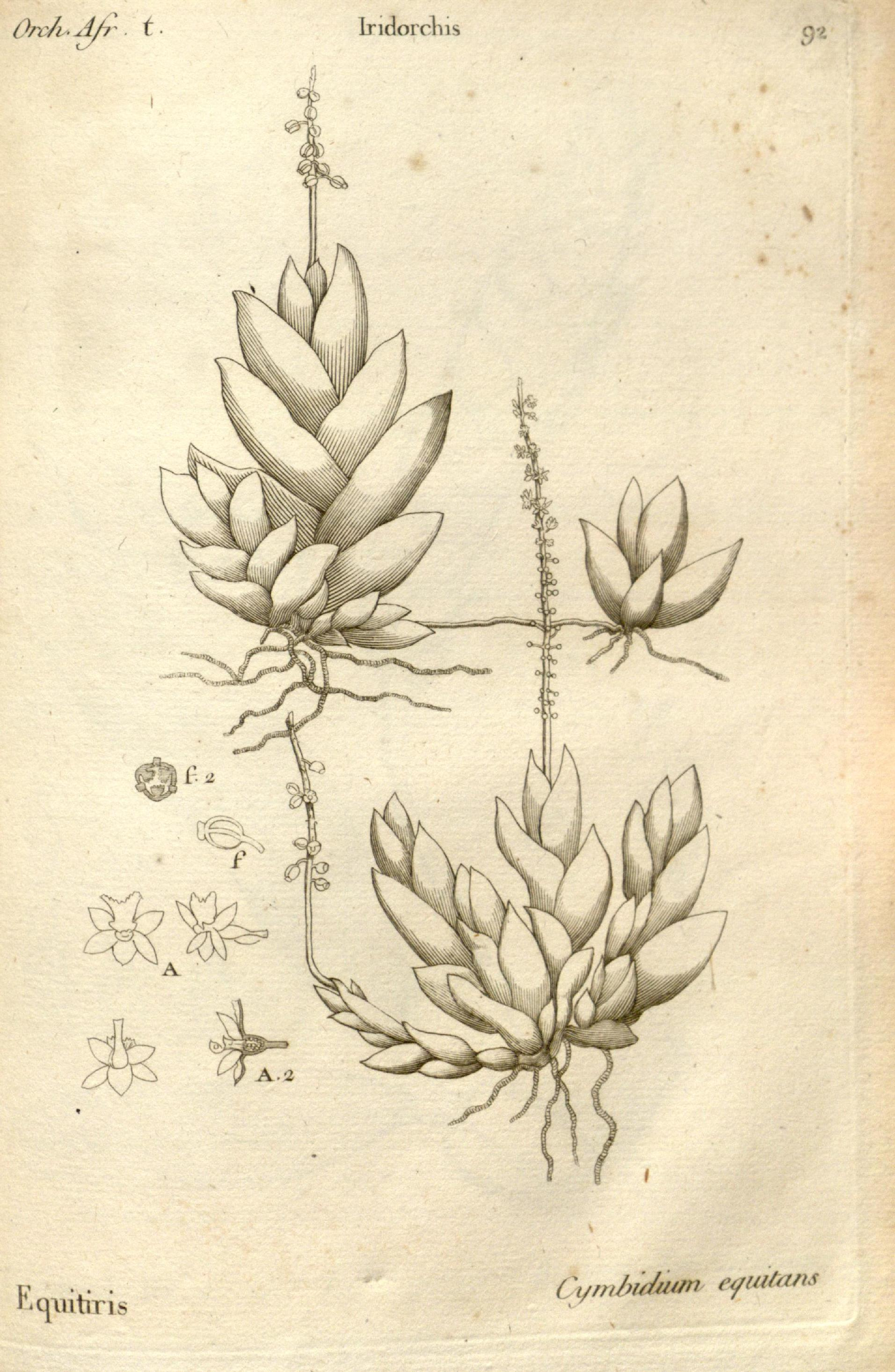

Scientific classification
- Kingdom: Plantae
- Clade: Tracheophytes
- Clade: Angiosperms
- Clade: Monocots
- Order: Asparagales
- Family: Orchidaceae
- Subfamily: Epidendroideae
- Genus: Oberonia
- Species: O. disticha

Binomial name
- Oberonia disticha (Lam.) Schltr.

= Oberonia disticha =

Species of orchid

Oberonia disticha is a species of orchid native to tropical and southern Africa and islands in the west Indian Ocean.
