= Oberonia jhae =

Conservation status
- Critically Endangered (IUCN 3.1)

Scientific classification
- Kingdom: Plantae
- Clade: Tracheophytes
- Clade: Angiosperms
- Clade: Monocots
- Order: Asparagales
- Family: Orchidaceae
- Subfamily: Epidendroideae
- Genus: Oberonia
- Species: O. jhae

Binomial name
- Oberonia jhae Chowlu & K.S.Rab

Species of orchid

Oberonia jhae is a species of critically endangered orchid endemic to Arunachal Pradesh in northeastern India. It was described by Krishna Chowlu in 2017 from a collection in Papum Pare district in Arunachal Pradesh. Very little information is known about its population and considering the decline in its habitat this species was classified as critically endangered.

== Description ==
This species of orchid is epiphytic with a 1 cm long stem. The base of this orchid is covered with 8 to 9 disjoint erect and flattened leaves of 1.5 - 3.2 cm long and 0.4-0.6 cm wide. The inflorescence is 4 to 7 cm long and extends beyond the leaves with drooping rachis that has multiple flowers. The tiny 0.5 cm green flowers have a lip of approximately 3.5 × 0.3 mm.

It can be differentiated from similar looking Oberonia emarginata species by greater number of leaves, smaller flowers and lip size, the shape and details of the lip along with other characteristics.

== Taxonomy and etymology ==
This orchid buds were collected from Kheel village in Papum Pare district of Arunachal Pradesh and cultivated inside the garden of regional centre of Botanical Survey of India in Itanagar. After comparing it with other Oberonia species found in the neighboring countries, it was concluded to be a new species.

Krishna Chowlu named this species after her teacher Subash Chandra Jha who supported her and an orchid enthusiast.

== Distribution and habitat ==
This species was known to occur only in the Kheel village in Arunachal Pradesh. A survey revealed a population of 3 matured individuals within a 1 km^{2}. It was found growing on tree trunks and branches covered with moss inside a broad-leaved evergreen tropical forests at an elevation of 642 m. It was found flowering in May.

== Conservation and threats ==
The location where this species is known to occur is inside a community managed forest with no legal protection. The CITES Appendix-II offers protection from collection and trade of this species. Some of the threats for this slow growing species are Jhum cultivation, expansion of roads, logging and climate change.
