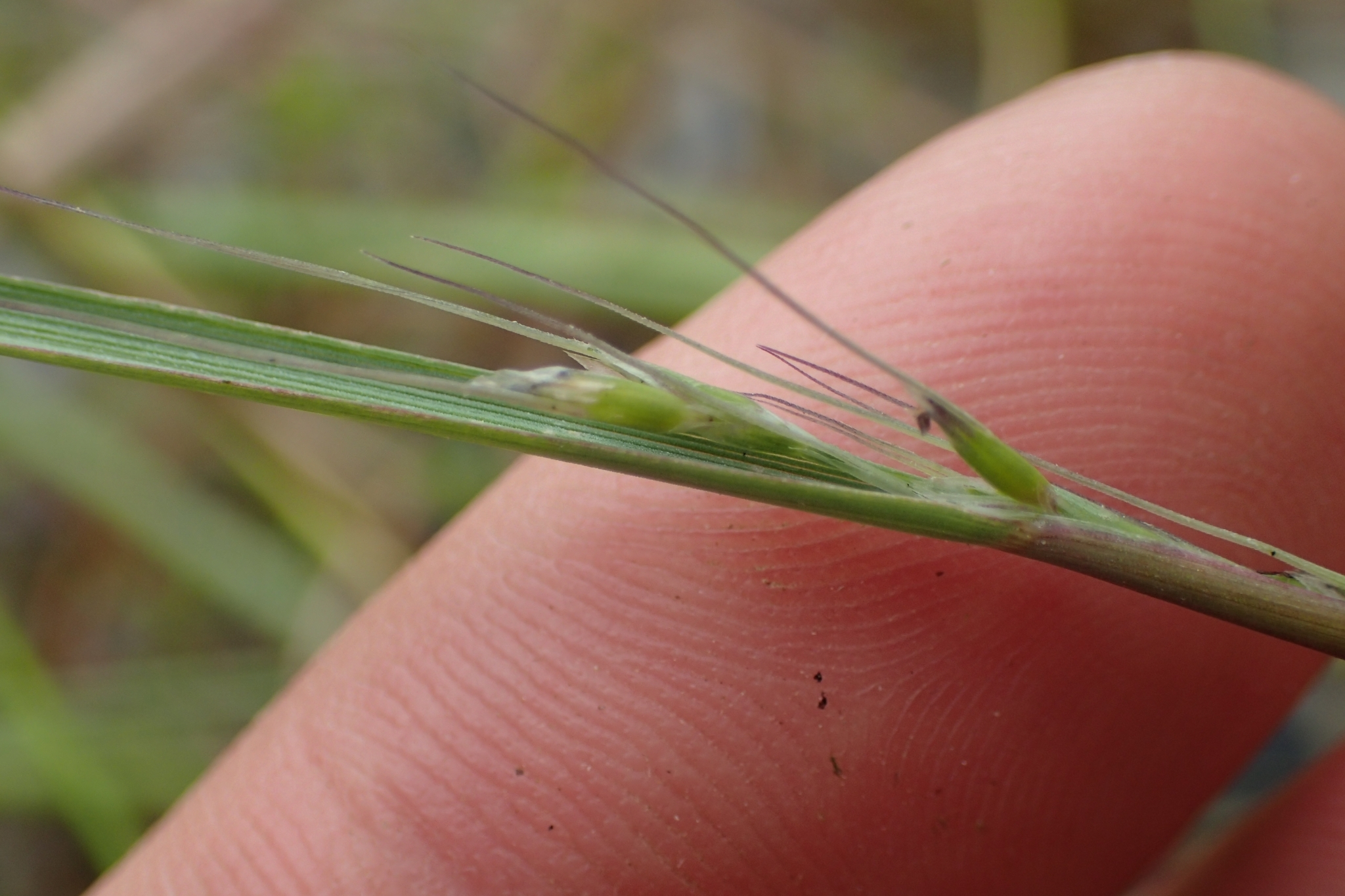

Conservation status
- Declining (NZ TCS)
- Vulnerable (NSWBCA)

Scientific classification
- Kingdom: Plantae
- Clade: Tracheophytes
- Clade: Angiosperms
- Clade: Monocots
- Clade: Commelinids
- Order: Poales
- Family: Poaceae
- Subfamily: Pooideae
- Genus: Amphibromus
- Species: A. fluitans

Binomial name
- Amphibromus fluitans Kirk

= Amphibromus fluitans =

Species of plant

Amphibromus fluitans, water brome (New Zealand), river swamp wallaby-grass, or floating swamp wallaby-grass (Australian) is a species of true grass in the tribe Poeae.

== Description ==
Amphibromus fluitans is a perennial, stoloniferous, semi-aquatic grass that forms large grey-green mats. Spikelets are 15-25mm long, with 3-6 laterally arranged florets, tipped with awns on the lemmas, between 7-18mm long.

It is very difficult to identify without fertile parts. Thus, it can be confused with other aquatic grasses like Agrostis stolonifera, Alopecurus geniculatus, or Glyceria.

== Distribution ==
Amphibromus fluitans is indigenous to New Zealand and Australia.

In New Zealand, it is found in the North Island from Ninety Mile Beach and Karikari Peninsula in Northland to Paekākāriki and Lake Wairarapa in Wellington. In the South Island, it has been found at three locations: Maher's Swamp near Punakaiki (1991), Lake Tekapo (1935), and Lake Heron (2006).

In Australia, it is found in New South Wales, Victoria, and Tasmania.

== Habitat ==
Amphibromus fluitans is found in seasonally dry wetland or on edges of shallow lakes and lagoons from lowlands to montane.

== Life cycle ==
Amphibromus fluitans is dependent on changes in water depth in seasonal wetlands. It tends to germinate from long-lived seedbanks and flower only when water levels are low. As such, it can be apparently absent from suitable habitat for many years before reappearing.

== Threats ==
In New Zealand, Amphibromus fluitans is listed as At Risk - Declining. In the South Island, surveys in 1992 and 1998 have failed to find the species at Maher's Swamp, and it has not been found at Lake Tekapo since the original collection. In the North Island, sizeable populations are only known from Waihora Lagoon, west of Lake Taupō, Arohaki Lagoon, Whirinaki, and Lake Wairarapa. The species was formerly known from the Waikato, Taranaki, and Auckland, but has not been found in these areas recently.

The most likely causes of decline in New Zealand are habitat loss through wetland drainage, as well as stock grazing, and competition from invasive wetland weeds. At one site on Lake Wairarapa, lowered water levels, cattle pugging, and shorter periods of inundation has allowed the invasive weeds Ludwigia sp., Persicaria sp., Myosotis sp., Rumex sp., and Agrostis stolonifera to invade.

In Australia, Amphibromus fluitans is listed as vulnerable under the New South Wales Threatened Species Conservation Act. Threats are largely habitat loss, though drainage of lowland swamps for agriculture, and the construction of dams. It is also threatened by the trampling and grazing by livestock and invasion by exotic grasses and weeds.

== Gallery ==
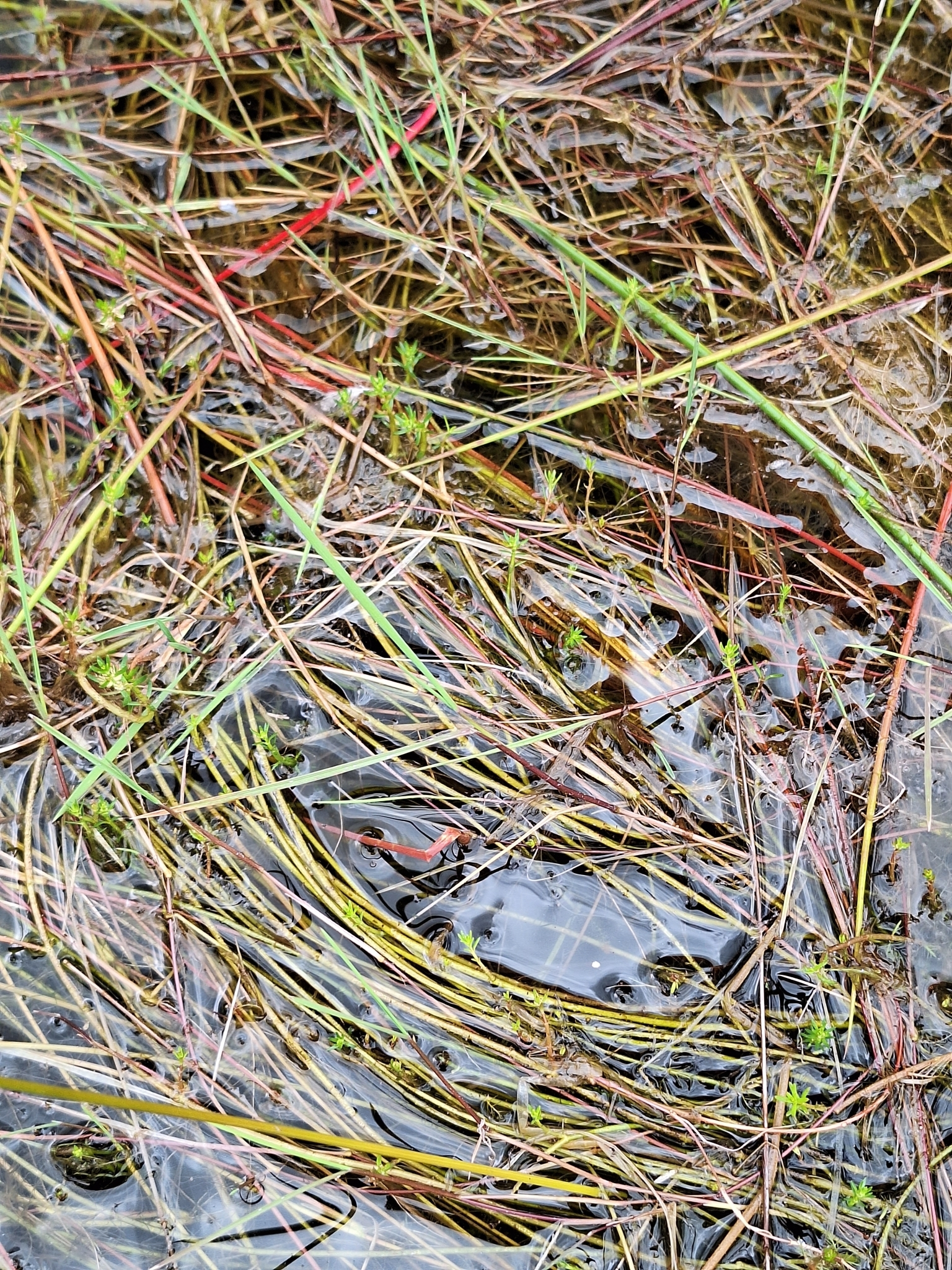
Photo from distance

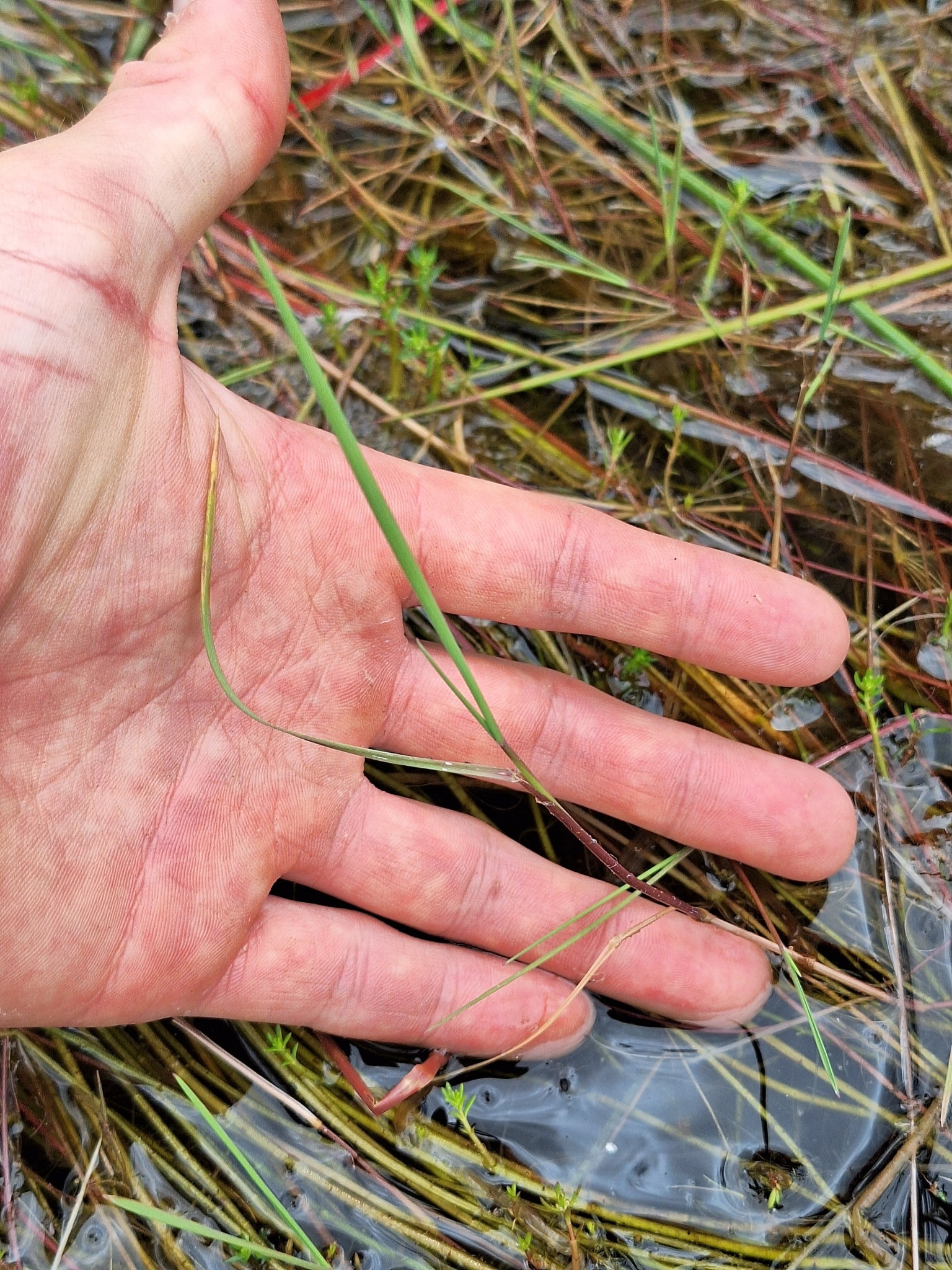
A. fluitans leaves
