= Oberonia bopannae =

Conservation status
- Critically Endangered (IUCN 3.1)

Scientific classification
- Kingdom: Plantae
- Clade: Tracheophytes
- Clade: Angiosperms
- Clade: Monocots
- Order: Asparagales
- Family: Orchidaceae
- Subfamily: Epidendroideae
- Genus: Oberonia
- Species: O. bopannae

Binomial name
- Oberonia bopannae Chowlu & Kumar

Species of orchid

Oberonia bopannae is a critically endangered species of epiphytic orchid native to Arunachal Pradesh state in northeastern India.

== Description ==
An epiphytic orchid with a 2.5-3.5 cm long stem with 4-5 leaves that are oblong˗lanceolate. It has a drooping inflorescence with a rachis that can grow up to 19 cm long many densely packed flowers. The flowers are orange-pale green in color. The lip is square shaped with a 2.5 x 2.5 mm size and brownish-yellow in color.

It looks similar to Oberonia gammiei and Oberonia mucronata but can be differentiated by tripinnate squarish lip, shorter stem along with other traits.

== Distribution ==
This species of orchid was found only in a small area called Tengapani in Namsai district of Arunachal Pradesh.

== Ecology ==
This orchid grows on mossy tree trunks inside wet evergreen forests at an elevation of 151 meters along with other epiphytic species of orchids like Dendrobium and Pholidota and ferns. The flowering season is from October to November.

== Etymology ==
This orchid was named after Lieutenant General B.K.Bopanna, former director of NCC of India for his love for orchids.

== Conservation and threats ==
As of 2023 IUCN assessment, this species is known from only one location in a 4 km^{2} habitat with 10 mature individuals. Since Namsai district is recently formed, there is a threat of development impacting the habitat of this species. Further, the species can be identified accurately only when flowering making it more difficult to assess the distribution.
