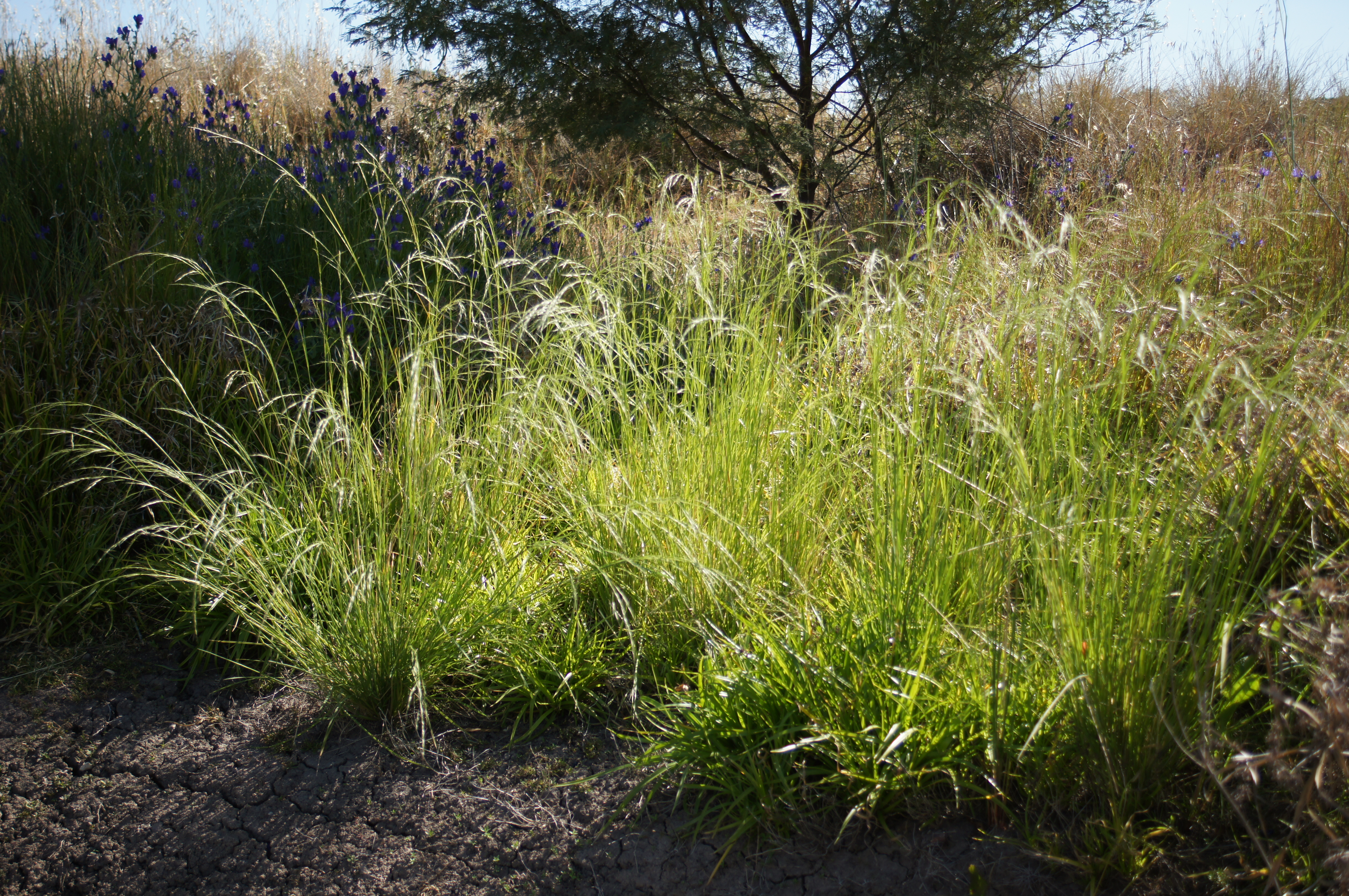
- Amphibromus nervosus

Scientific classification
- Kingdom: Plantae
- Clade: Tracheophytes
- Clade: Angiosperms
- Clade: Monocots
- Clade: Commelinids
- Order: Poales
- Family: Poaceae
- Subfamily: Pooideae
- Supertribe: Poodae
- Tribe: Poeae
- Subtribe: Torreyochloinae
- Genus: Amphibromus; Nees

Type species
- Amphibromus neesii Steud.

= Amphibromus =

Genus of grasses

Amphibromus is a genus of grasses in the family Poaceae. Most are known as swamp wallaby grass. Most are endemic to Australia. One can also be found in New Zealand and there are two species in South America.

These are annual or perennial grasses. Some can have cleistogamous inflorescences sheathed on their stems. The open inflorescences may be spreading or spikelike. These may have some cleistogamous spikelets in them, as well.

Most species occur in moist to wet habitat types. Some tolerate periodic flooding well, even flowering in response to it.

Species

- Amphibromus archeri - pointed swamp wallaby grass - South Australia, Tasmania, Victoria
- Amphibromus fluitans - river swamp wallaby grass, graceful swamp wallaby grass - Tasmania, Victoria, New South Wales, New Zealand (North + South Is)
- Amphibromus macrorhinus - long-nosed swamp wallaby grass - South Australia, Tasmania, Victoria, New South Wales, Western Australia
- Amphibromus neesii - southern swamp wallaby grass - Tasmania, Victoria, New South Wales; naturalized in California
- Amphibromus nervosus - common swamp wallaby grass, veined swamp wallaby grass - South Australia, Victoria, New South Wales, Western Australia
- Amphibromus pithogastrus - plump swamp wallaby grass - Victoria, New South Wales
- Amphibromus quadridentulus - Brazil (Rio Grande do Sul, Santa Catarina, Paraná, Rio de Janeiro, Minas Gerais), Argentina (Entre Ríos, Misiones), Uruguay
- Amphibromus recurvatus - dark swamp wallaby grass - South Australia, Tasmania, Victoria
- Amphibromus scabrivalvis - rough amphibromus - Bolivia (La Paz), Brazil, Argentina, Chile, Uruguay, Peru; naturalized in Louisiana
- Amphibromus sinuatus - wavy swamp wallaby grass - Tasmania, Victoria, New South Wales
- Amphibromus vickeryae - Western Australia
- †Amphibromus whitei small swamp wallaby grass - †Queensland but extinct
