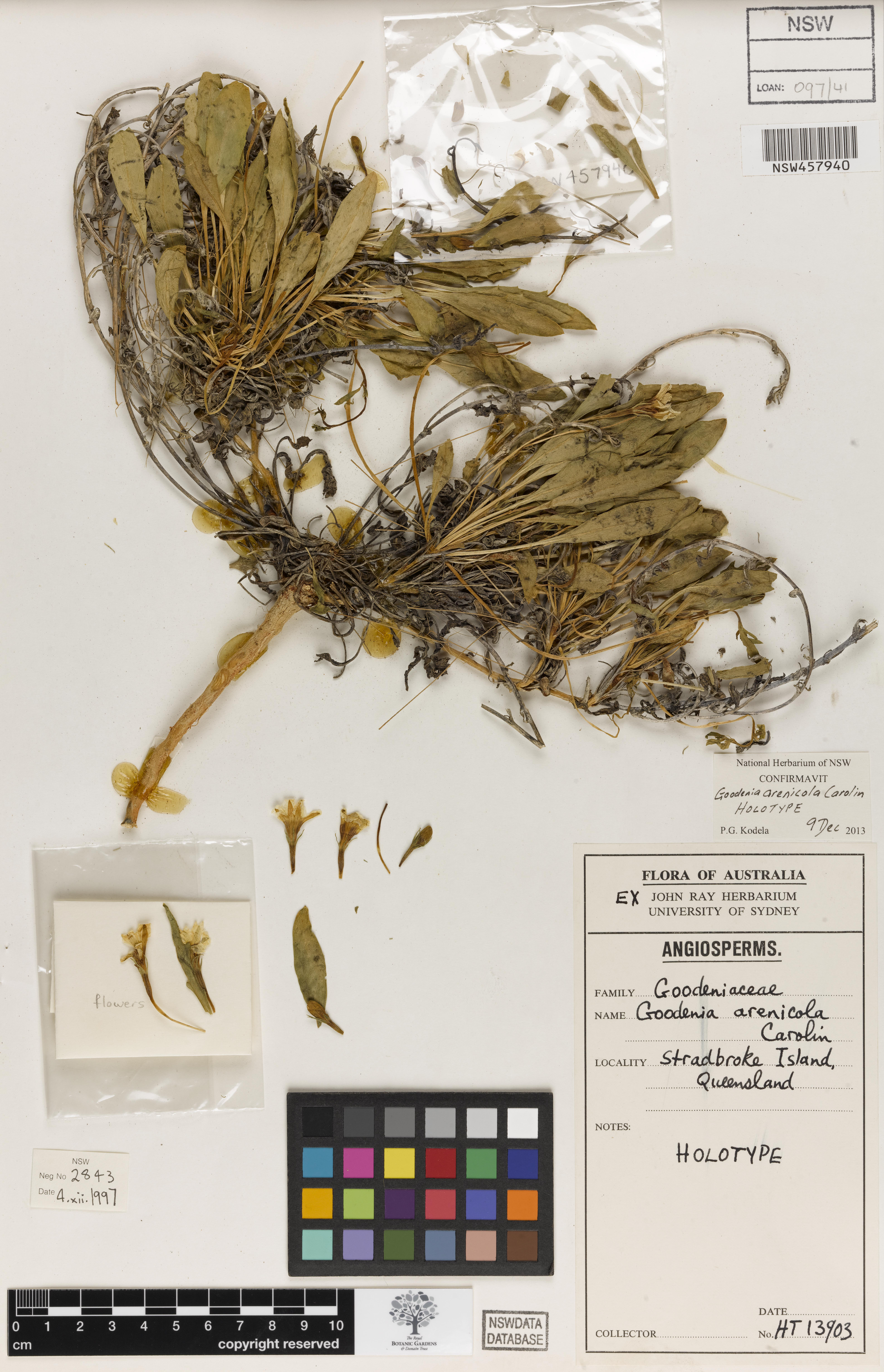
- Holotype at Sydney University

Scientific classification
- Kingdom: Plantae
- Clade: Embryophytes
- Clade: Tracheophytes
- Clade: Spermatophytes
- Clade: Angiosperms
- Clade: Eudicots
- Clade: Asterids
- Order: Asterales
- Family: Goodeniaceae
- Genus: Goodenia
- Species: G. arenicola

Binomial name
- Goodenia arenicola Carolin

= Goodenia arenicola =

Species of plant

Goodenia arenicola is a species of flowering plant in the family Goodeniaceae and was endemic to Stradbroke Island in Queensland. It is a stolon-forming or rhizome-forming herb covered with soft hairs, with lance-shaped leaves mostly clustered at the end of short stems, and yellow flowers arranged singly in leaf axils. It is listed as critically endangered.

== Description ==
Goodenia arenicola is a stolon- or rhizome-forming herb covered with soft hairs. The leaves are mostly clustered at the ends of short stems and lance-shaped with the narrower end towards the base, 40–100 mm (1.6–3.9 in) long and 8–14 mm (0.31–0.55 in) wide, sometimes with teeth on the edges. The flowers are arranged singly in leaf axils on a peduncle 30–40 mm (1.2–1.6 in) long, with linear bracteoles 4–6 mm (0.16–0.24 in) long. The sepals are linear, 5–6 mm (0.20–0.24 in) long, the petals yellow and 15–17 mm (0.59–0.67 in) long. The lower lobes of the corolla are 7–8 mm (0.28–0.31 in) long with wings about 2.5 mm (0.098 in) wide.

== Taxonomy and naming ==
Goodenia arenicola was first formally described in 1990 Roger Charles Carolin in the journal Telopea from specimens collected on Stradbroke Island. The specific epithet (arenicola) means "sand-dweller".

== Distribution and habitat ==
This goodenia is only known from the type location where it grew on stabilized sand dunes.

== Conservation status ==
In 2009, Goodenia arenicola was listed as "extinct in the wild" through the Nature Conservation (Wildlife) Amendment Regulation (No. 1) 2009. It is now classified as "critically endangered" under the Queensland Government Nature Conservation Act 1992 using the Nature Conservation (Plants) Regulation 2020.
