= Prostanthera albohirta =

Conservation status
- Critically endangered (EPBC Act)

Scientific classification
- Kingdom: Plantae
- Clade: Tracheophytes
- Clade: Angiosperms
- Clade: Eudicots
- Clade: Asterids
- Order: Lamiales
- Family: Lamiaceae
- Genus: Prostanthera
- Species: P. albohirta

Binomial name
- Prostanthera albohirta C.T.White
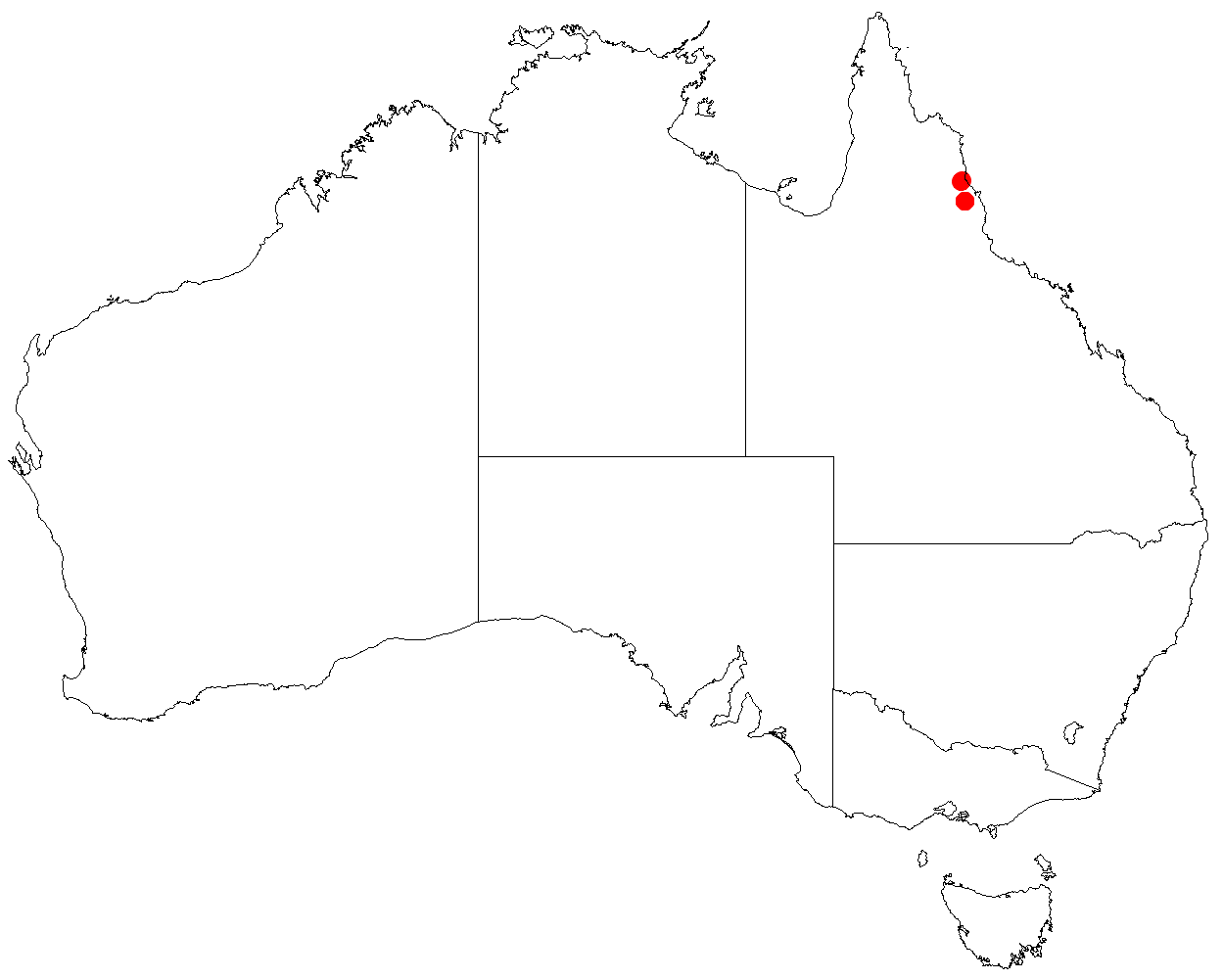
- occurrence data from AVH

Synonyms
- Prostanthera albo-hirta C.T.White orth. var.; Prostanthera alboihirta M.B.Thomas & W.J.McDonald orth. var.

Species of flowering plant

Prostanthera albohirta is a species of flowering plant in the family Lamiaceae and is endemic to a restricted area of Queensland. It is a small, erect, densely-foliaged shrub with egg-shaped leaves and hairy, lilac to lavender flowers arranged singly in four to twelve leaf axils near the ends of branchlets.

== Description ==
Prostanthera albohirta is an erect, spreading shrub that typically grows to a height of 1–2.5 m (3 ft 3 in – 8 ft 2 in) with densely hairy, cylindrical stems. The leaves are egg-shaped, dull green, 6–8.5 mm (0.24–0.33 in) long and 5–7 mm (0.20–0.28 in) wide on a petiole 0.5–1.5 mm (0.020–0.059 in) long. The flowers are arranged singly in four to twelve axils near the ends of branchlets, each flower on a pedicel 1.5–2.5 mm (0.059–0.098 in) long. The sepals are densely covered with white hairs and form a tube about 3 mm (0.12 in) long with two lobes, the lower lobe 2 mm (0.079 in) long and the upper lobe 3 mm (0.12 in) long. The petals are hairy, lilac to lavender and fused to form a tube about 10 mm (0.39 in) long. The lower lip has three lobes, the centre about 3 mm (0.12 in) long and 3 mm (0.12 in) wide and the side lobes about 2 mm (0.079 in) long and 2.5 mm (0.098 in) wide. The upper lip has two lobes fused with a small notch at the join. Flowering has been recorded in January.

== Taxonomy ==
Prostanthera albohirta was first formally described in 1936 by Cyril Tenison White in the Proceedings of the Royal Society of Queensland from specimens collected on the "summit of Mount Demi, alt. 3,000 ft., on exposed cliff faces" by Leonard John Brass.

== Distribution and habitat ==
Between 1932 and 2013, this mintbush was only known from Brass's single collection and attempts to collect further specimens failed. Then in 2013, the species was discovered on Mount Emerald near Tolga at elevations above 900 m (3,000 ft). Only about fifty plants have been found, growing in a dense shrub layer in a protected gully dominated by stunted Syncarpia glomulifera.

== Conservation status ==
Prostanthera albohirta is classified as "critically endangered" under the Australian Government Environment Protection and Biodiversity Conservation Act 1999 and as "endangered" under the Queensland Government Nature Conservation Act 1992. The main threats to the species include inappropriate fire regimes, weed invasion, habitat loss caused by land clearing, and illegal collection.
