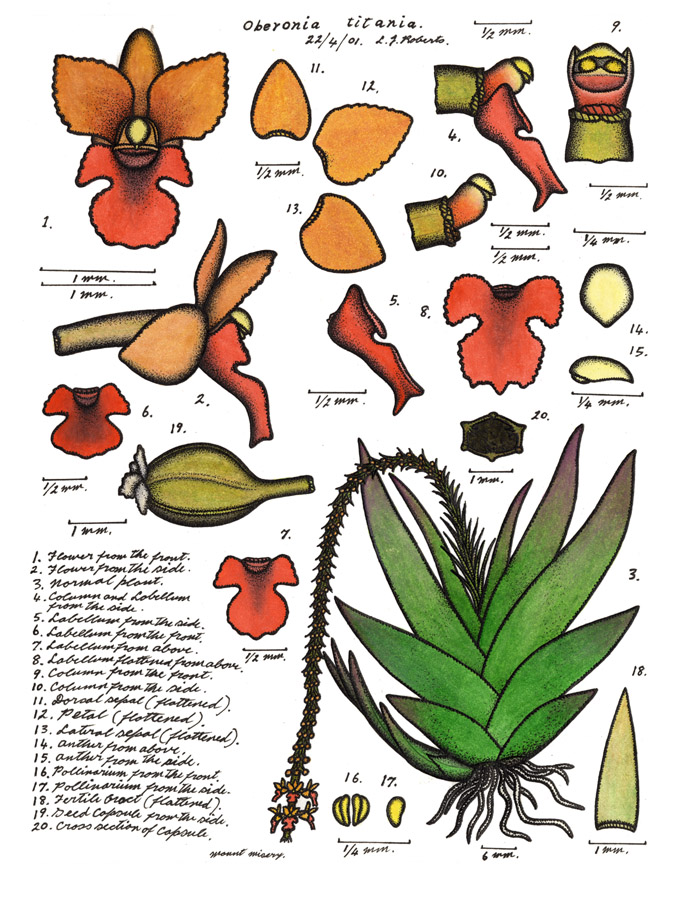
- Illustration by Lewis Roberts

Scientific classification
- Kingdom: Plantae
- Clade: Tracheophytes
- Clade: Angiosperms
- Clade: Monocots
- Order: Asparagales
- Family: Orchidaceae
- Subfamily: Epidendroideae
- Genus: Oberonia
- Species: O. titania

Binomial name
- Oberonia titania Lindl.

Synonyms
- Oberonia crateriformis D.L.Jones & M.A.Clem.; Oberonia neocaledonica Schltr.; Oberonia rimachila D.L.Jones & M.A.Clem.; Titania miniata Endl.; Oberonia palmicola auct. non F.Muell.: Maiden, J.H. (1904), The Flora of Norfolk Island. Part i. Proceedings of the Linnean Society of New South Wales 28(4)

= Oberonia titania =

Species of orchid

Oberonia titania, commonly known as soldier's crest orchid or red-flowered king of the fairies, is a plant in the orchid family and is a clump-forming epiphyte. It has between four and ten leaves in a fan-like arrangement on each shoot and up to 350 tiny pinkish to red flowers arranged in whorls around the flowering stem. It is found in Java, New Caledonia and eastern Australia including Norfolk Island.

== Description ==
Oberonia titania is an epiphytic, clump-forming herb. Each shoot has between four and ten fleshy, lance-shaped to egg-shaped, green or greyish leaves 40–60 mm (1.6–2.4 in) long and 3–5 mm (0.12–0.20 in) wide with their bases overlapping. Between 50 and 350 pinkish to red flowers about 1.2 mm (0.047 in) long and 1.0 mm (0.039 in) wide are arranged in whorls of between six and eight on an arching to hanging flowering stem 30–80 mm (1.2–3.1 in) long. The sepals and petals are egg-shaped, spread widely apart from each other and about 0.9 mm (0.035 in) long. The labellum is cup shaped, about 1.0 mm (0.039 in) long and 0.6 mm (0.024 in) wide with three lobes. Flowering occurs between January and June.

== Taxonomy and naming ==
Oberonia titania was first formally described in 1859 by John Lindley who published the description in Folia Orchidaceae.

== Distribution and habitat ==
Soldier's crest orchid grows on trees in rainforest and moist gullies in Java, New Caledonia, New South Wales including Norfolk Island and in Queensland.

== Conservation ==
This orchid is classed as "vulnerable" under the New South Wales Government Biodiversity Conservation Act 2016. The main threats to the species are habitat degradation and loss, and illegal collecting.
