= Amphibromus whitei =

Conservation status
- Extinct (EPBC Act)

Scientific classification
- Kingdom: Plantae
- Clade: Tracheophytes
- Clade: Angiosperms
- Clade: Monocots
- Clade: Commelinids
- Order: Poales
- Family: Poaceae
- Subfamily: Pooideae
- Genus: Amphibromus
- Species: †A. whitei

Binomial name
- †Amphibromus whitei C.E.Hubb.

Species of grass

Amphibromus whitei is an extinct species of perennial aquatic grass. The type specimen was collected in Queensland in the Maranoa district on the edge of a fresh water swamp.

== Conservation status ==
Amphibromus whitei is listed as "extinct in the wild" under the Queensland Nature Conservation Act 1992, "extinct" under the Environment Protection and Biodiversity Conservation Act 1999.
