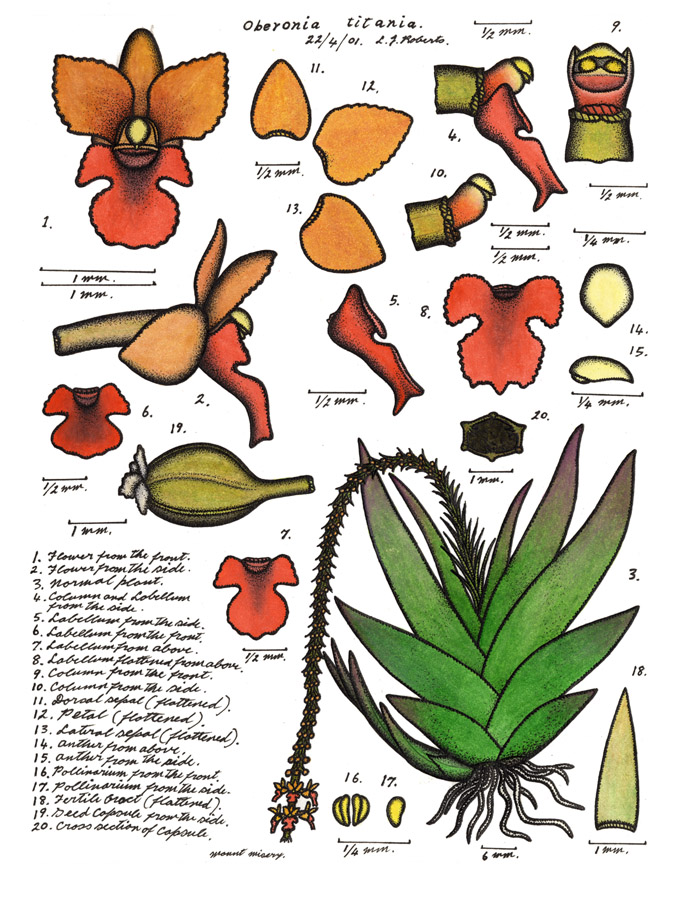
- Oberonia titania illustration by Lewis Roberts
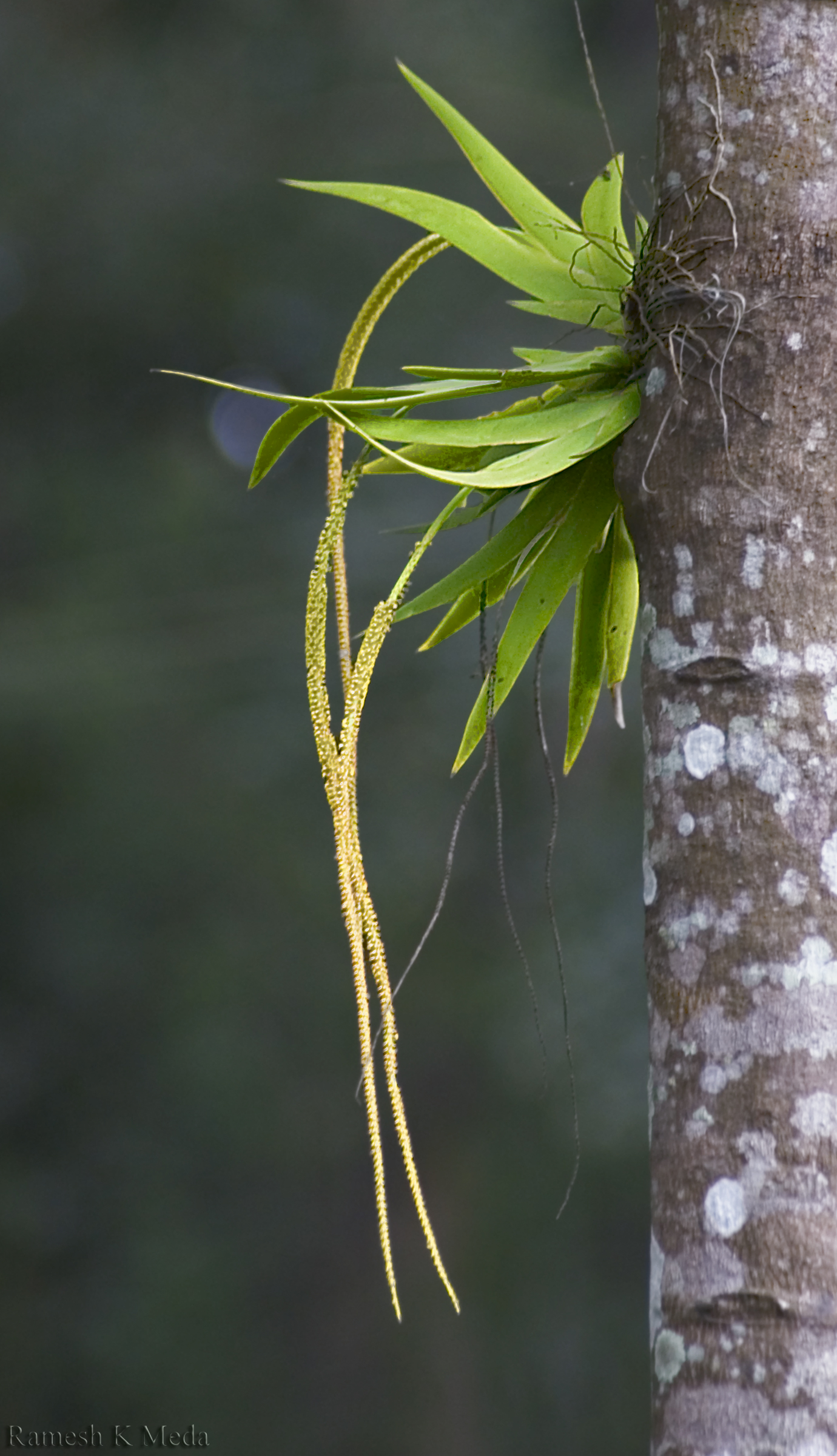
- Oberonia sp. Nagara Hole National Park, India

Scientific classification
- Kingdom: Plantae
- Clade: Tracheophytes
- Clade: Angiosperms
- Clade: Monocots
- Order: Asparagales
- Family: Orchidaceae
- Subfamily: Epidendroideae
- Tribe: Malaxideae
- Subtribe: Malaxidinae
- Genus: Oberonia; Lindl.

Species
- List of Oberonia species

Synonyms
- Iridorkis Thouars; Titania Endl.

= Oberonia =

Fairy orchids

Genus of orchids

Oberonia, commonly known as fairy orchids, is a genus of flowering plants in the family Orchidaceae. Orchids in this genus are epiphytic or lithophytic plants with the leaves arranged fan-like, overlapping at the base and spreading near the tips. Large numbers of tiny, short-lived, cup-shaped, non-resupinate flowers are arranged on an arching flowering stem that emerges from the base of the uppermost leaf. There are about 270 species occurring from tropical and southern Africa to the Pacific.

== Description ==
Orchids in the genus Oberonia are epiphytic or lithophytic, sympodial herbs with the leaves in an unusual fan-like arrangement, in two overlapping rows near the base before spreading. A large number of tiny, non-resupinate, short-lived flowers are arranged in whorls or spirals along an arching flowering stem. The sepals and petals are all more or less similar to and free from each other although the petals are narrower than the sepals. The labellum is rigidly fixed to the base of the column and usually has three lobes.

== Taxonomy and naming ==
The genus Oberonia was first formally described in 1830 by John Lindley who published the description in The Genera and Species of Orchidaceous Plants. The name Oberonia is a reference to Oberon, the king of the fairies, referring to the tiny flowers of these orchids and to their unusual arrangement on the flowering stems.

== Distribution ==
Orchids in the genus Oberonia are native to tropical Africa, southern Asia including India, China, Japan, Indochina, Indonesia and the Philippines) and to Australia, and various islands of the Pacific and Indian Oceans.

== See also ==
- List of Oberonia species
