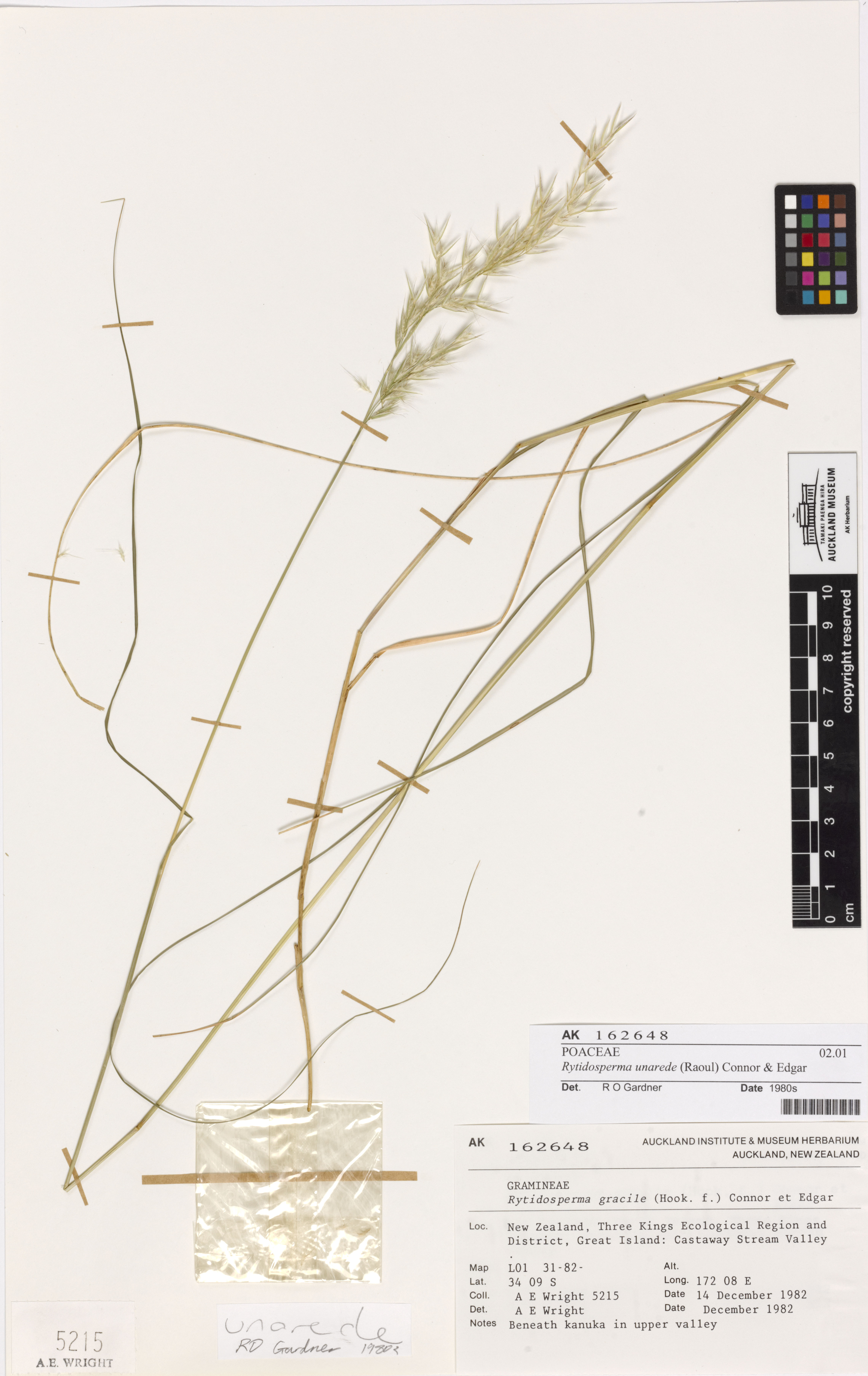

Scientific classification
- Kingdom: Plantae
- Clade: Tracheophytes
- Clade: Angiosperms
- Clade: Monocots
- Clade: Commelinids
- Order: Poales
- Family: Poaceae
- Genus: Rytidosperma
- Species: R. unarede

Binomial name
- Rytidosperma unarede (Raoul) Connor & Edgar (1979)

Synonyms
- Danthonia unarede Raoul (1844)

= Rytidosperma unarede =

Species of grass

Rytidosperma unarede (Māori: Unarede), also known as cliff fairy grass is a vascular plant in the family Poaceae (the grass family). It is indigenous to New Zealand and Lord Howe Island. It was first described as Danthonia unarede by Étienne Raoul in 1844. The specific epithet unarede is likely derived from the Māori name of the plant.

== Description ==
It is an slender perennial tufted grass, growing to about 45 cm in height. The leaf blade grows up to 40 in length and 3.5 mm wide, or is tightly inrolled. The panicle is erect, slightly branched, 5–10 cm long and 1–2.3 cm wide.

R. unarede has 2n = 48 chromosomes.

=== Identification ===
As a Rytidosperma, the easiest way to identify R. unarede is to select a single floret (which will contain a single awn, two lateral lobes, and usually three rows of hairs - one on the callus and two on the lemma). The arrangement of the hairs, as well as the relative lengths of the awn, lateral lobes, sometimes the callus can help identify to species, using a key such as that found in the New Zealand Flora.

=== Similar species ===
R. unarede is most similar to R. biannulare. These two species are differentiated from all other New Zealand Rytidosperma by their long lateral lemma lobes and upper lemma hairs, which exceed the awn column, and by their short lower lemma hairs. However, they are differentiated from one another by R. biannulare having an awn column that is much longer than the palea.

== Distribution ==
The grass is native to New Zealand, where it is found on the Kermadec, Three Kings, North, South, Stewart, and Chatham Islands. It is apparently rare to west of Main Divide in the South Island.

R. unarede was first discovered on the Kermadec Islands in 1994 by botanist A. E. Wright. It is possible that it is a new arrival which is still localised, given that it is currently found only in one place on the islands.

It is also a rare inhabitant of Australia's subtropical Lord Howe Island in the Tasman Sea.

=== Type specimen ===
The type specimen of R. unarede was collected near the Akaroa Peninsula by Étienne Raoul in 1843.

== Habitat ==
R. unarede is found in coastal areas, as well as grasslands and disturbed sites in lowland to montane areas, and on cliff faces and sparsely-vegetated hillsides. On Lord Howe it is recorded as growing in goat dung-affected soil on dry basalt.

== Ecology ==
The rust fungus Uromyces danthoniae, a species found that grows parasitically on the leaves of several Rytidosperma species in New Zealand and Australia, infects Rytidosperma unarede. It forms dense clusters of orange-brown aecidia on both surfaces of the leaf.

It is also a host of Sphaerodothella danthoniae, a sac fungus that produces black, shiny leaf spots that occasionally coalesce into straight to irregular lines in the leaf surface of several species of Rytidosperma.

== Threats ==
R. unarede is classified as Not Threatened under the New Zealand Threat Classification System.

== Taxonomy ==
R. unarede was originally described in the genus Danthonia as D. unarede by Étienne Raoul in 1844. In 1864, Joseph Dalton Hooker moved the species to a varietal rank under D. semiannularis as var. unarede. The species remained at this rank until Russian-New Zealand botanist Victor Zotov reinstated it as a full species, under the name Notodanthonia unarede.

The genus Notodanthonia was synonymised with Rytidosperma in Nicora (1973), after it was recognised that they referred to the same group. The genus Notodanthonia was only described in 1963 by Zotov, whereas Rytidosperma was described in 1854 by Steudel. As such, the older name Rytidosperma took priority under the International Code of Nomenclature. In 1979, New Zealand botanists Henry Connor and Elizabeth Edgar moved the whole Notodanthonia genus to Rytidosperma, following Nicora (1973), and named the species Rytidosperma unarede.

=== Etymology ===
Rytidosperma: 'wrinkled seed' from the Greek 'rhytidos' = wrinkled and 'sperma' = seed

unarede: derived from the Te Reo Māori name for the grass - according to Raoul, 'Vulgo Unarede' or, the common name is unarede.

== Gallery ==
An R. unarede tussock

R. unarede inflorescence

R. unarede floret
