= Rytidosperma horrens =

Scientific classification
- Kingdom: Plantae
- Clade: Tracheophytes
- Clade: Angiosperms
- Clade: Monocots
- Clade: Commelinids
- Order: Poales
- Family: Poaceae
- Genus: Rytidosperma
- Species: R. horrens

Binomial name
- Rytidosperma horrens Connor & Molloy

Species of plant

Rytidosperma horrens is a species of true grass in the subfamily Danthonioideae. It is endemic to New Zealand and was described as Rytidosperma horrens in 2005 by New Zealand botanists Brian Molloy and Henry Connor.

== Distribution ==
R. horrens is endemic to New Zealand, and is found only in the upper Maitland Catchment above Lake Ohau, in the South Island.

=== Type specimen ===
The typus (CHR 569766) was collected by Brian Molloy at Upper Maitland Stream, above Lake Ohau, on the 6th April 2004 while he was working as the QEII South Island High Country Representative.

== Habitat ==
R. horrens is found in wet flushes and tarn margins, as a component of short, dense, vegetation and 1200 meters above sea level.

At its type locality, R. horrens is described as growing in an alpine flush largely made up of Chionochloa rubra and Oreobolus pectinatus. It is found mainly beneath C. rubra tussocks as well as on the highest O. pectinatus cushions. It is also associated with Carpha alpina, Celmisia graminifolia, Carex wakatipu, Euchiton lateralis, Rytidosperma buchananii, Schoenus pauciflorus, Carex echinata, Drosera arcturi, and Juncus antarcticus.

== Description ==
R. horrens is a small, tufted tussock with a small culm up to 120 mm, tipped with a racemose inflorescence. Inflorescences contained 2-5 widely spaced and overlapping spikelets. The spikelets are 6-8 mm long, with 3-5 florets (flowers) with awns exserted. The lemma has lobed apexes around 1.5-2 mm, and a single awn around 1-1.5 mm. The florets contain three rows of hairs, one on the callus, and two on the lemmas. The upper and lower rows of hairs are in marginal tufts, with the lower not reaching the upper. The callus also has a short marginal hair tufts, which do not reach the lower row of lemma hairs.

It is diploid with 2n = 24 chromosomes.

=== Similar species ===
While from a distance, R. merum is not at all similar to R. horrens, the two species have very similar relative lengths of their floral features (specifically lemma hairs). However, R. merum is much larger and has longer inflorescences. R. horrens has shorter lateral lemma lobes (1.5-2.5 versus 3-8 mm), and shorter central awns (1.5-2.5 versus 6.5-14 mm) which are spaced 1 versus 2.5-3.5 mm away from the twisting column.

== Biology ==
R. horrens has chasmogamous flowers (i.e., with anthers and pistils that are open to the air) that are self-compatible, and are wind-pollinated.

== Threats ==
R. horrens is designated as Threatened - Nationally Critical under the New Zealand Threat Classification System. R. horrens is a rare species that is very range restricted to one catchment of the New Zealand South Island.

== Taxonomy ==
R. horrens is endemic to New Zealand and was described under its current name in 2005 by New Zealand botanists Brian Molloy and Henry Connor.

=== Etymology ===
Rytidosperma: 'wrinkled seed' from the Greek 'rhytidos' = wrinkled and 'sperma' = seed

horrens: From the Latin horrere, meaning to stand on end, like shivering hairs, which alludes to the bristling habit resulting from the stiff leaves which are produced at right angles to the axis.
