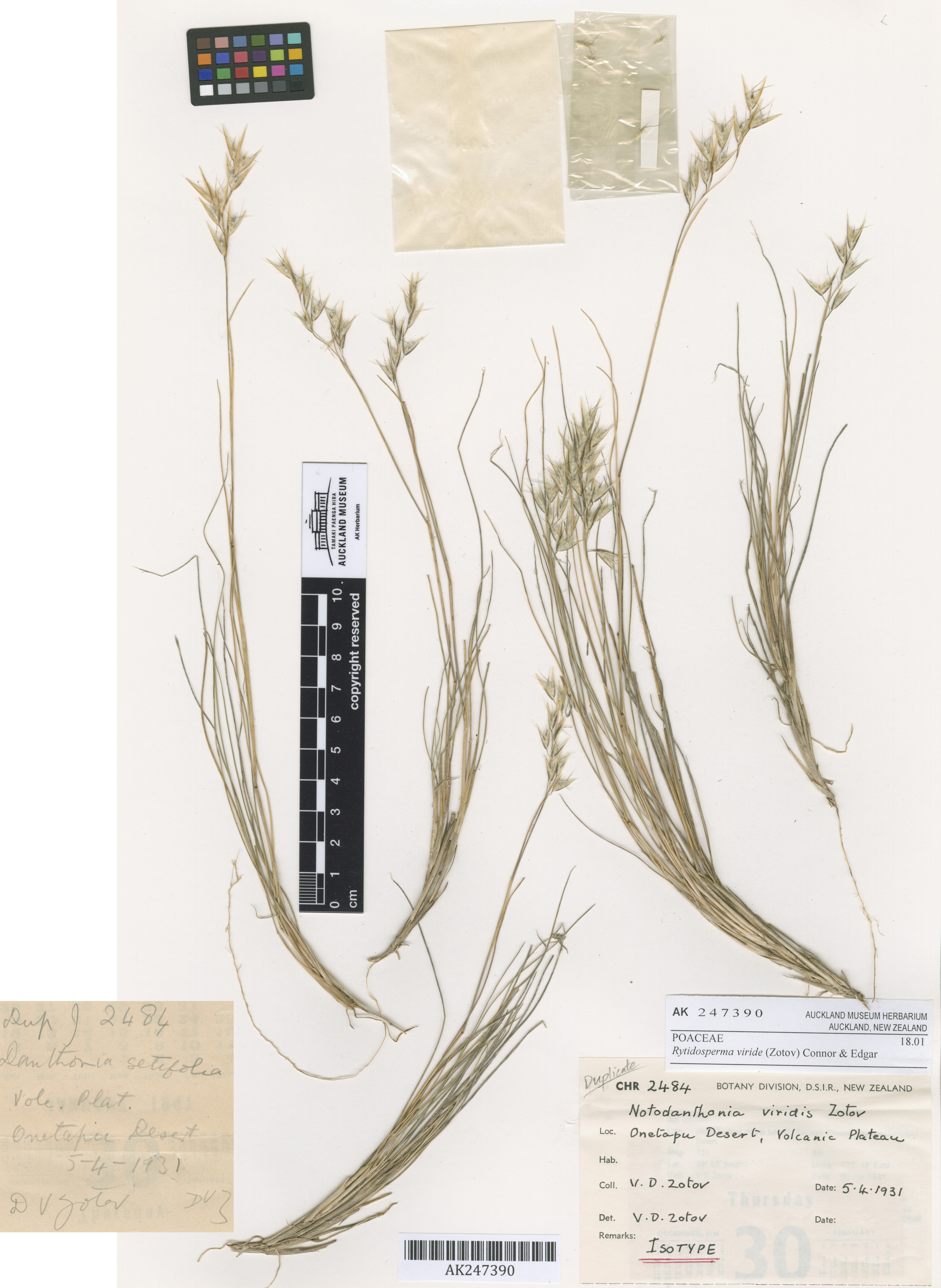

Conservation status
- Not Threatened (NZ TCS)

Scientific classification
- Kingdom: Plantae
- Clade: Tracheophytes
- Clade: Angiosperms
- Clade: Monocots
- Clade: Commelinids
- Order: Poales
- Family: Poaceae
- Genus: Rytidosperma
- Species: R. viride

Binomial name
- Rytidosperma viride (Zotov) Connor & Edgar

= Rytidosperma viride =

Species of grass

Rytidosperma viride is a flowering plant in the family Poaceae (the grass family). It is endemic to Aotearoa/New Zealand and was described as Notodanthonia viride in 1963.

== Distribution ==
Rytidosperma viride is endemic to Aotearoa/New Zealand. In the North Island, it is found in the Volcanic Plateau, Taranaki Maunga, Raukumara, and the Coromandel Ranges, with one specimen on Te Mata Peak. In the South Island, it is found scattered in the Kahurangi National Park.

The type specimen was collected by Victor Zotov, a Russian-New Zealand botanist specialising in grasses (who also described the species). It was collected in Onetapu Desert (usually called Rangipo Desert), Volcanic Plateau, on the 5th April 1931.

== Habitat ==
In Flora V, it is described as being found in rocky places in montane and subalpine zones. The habitat of specimens have been described as "stony (greywacke) river flat in red tussock grassland", and "open grassland on steep hillside".

On Mount Tarawera, R. viride is found in herbfield communities dominated by Pimelea prostrata var. prostrata, Gaultheria paniculata, G. oppositifolia, and Erica lusitanica. It is also found growing in mossland dominated by Racomitrium lanuginosum, Bryum laevigatum, and Campylopus clavatus, sometimes with Raoulia glabra and R. albosericea.

== Description ==
Rytidosperma viride is a grass with tussocks made of short, stiff dark green leaves on branches that are intravaginal (with shoots emerging from within the sheath of the previous node). Like most Rytidosperma, there is a tuft of hairs above the ligule. The leaf-blades are up to 35cm and culms up to 45cm. Spikelets have 3-4 florets, with awned glumes. Florets contain three rows of long hairs, one on the callus (the breaking point with the spikelet), and two on the glumes. The callus hairs are long, reaching the lower lemma hairs, the upper lemma hairs exceed the tip of the palea, and the upper and lower lemma hairs are equally long.

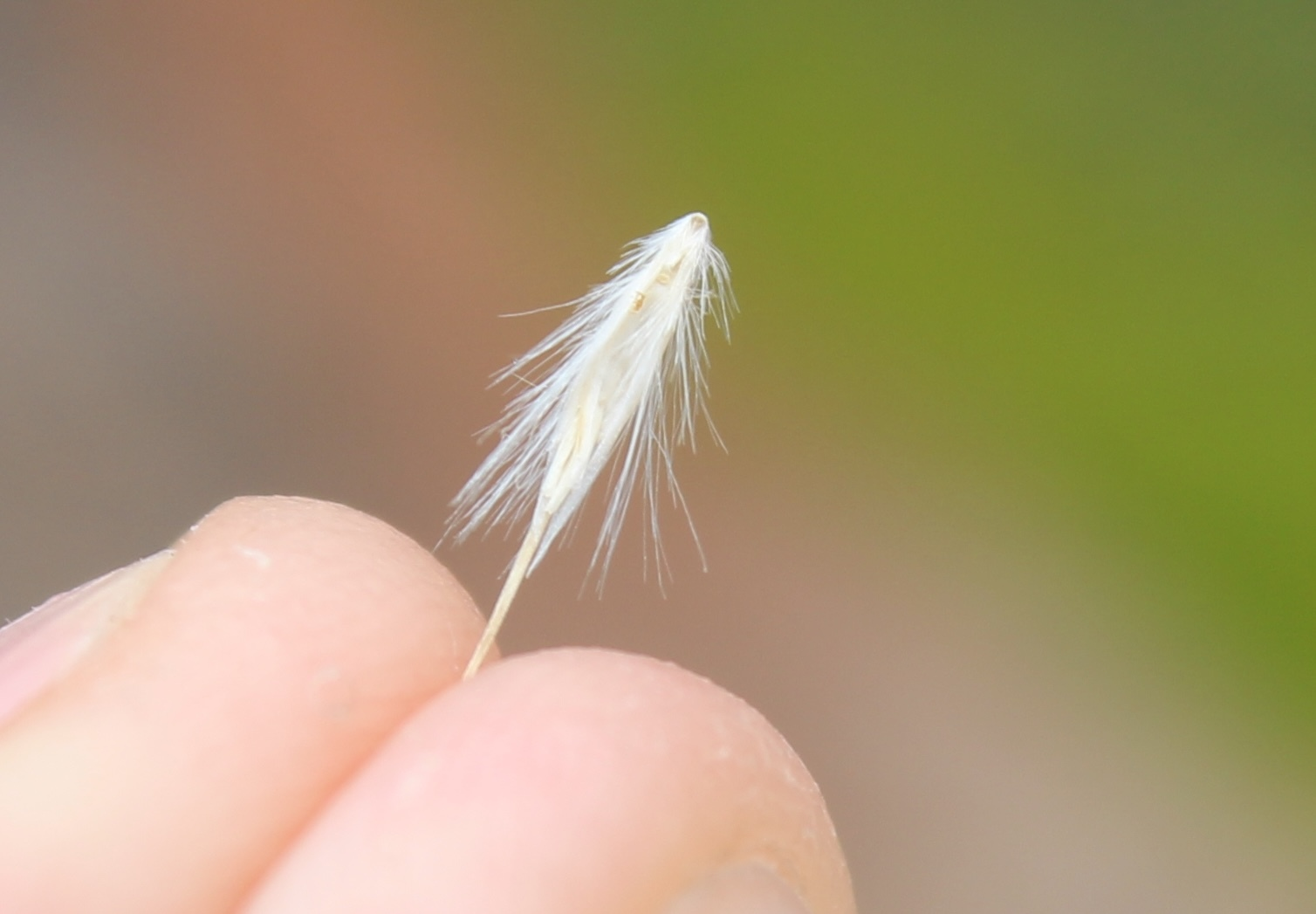
R. viride floret, showing callus hairs overlapping lower lemma hairs.

=== Identification ===
As a Rytidosperma, the easiest way to identify R. buchananii is to select a single floret (which will contain a single awn, two lateral lobes, and usually three rows of hairs - one on the callus and two on the lemma). The arrangement of the hairs, as well as the relative lengths of the awn, lateral lobes, sometimes the callus can help identify to species, using a key such as that found in the New Zealand Flora.

=== Similar species ===
It is most similar to R. gracile, R. nigricans, and R. geniculatum. From the first two, it can be distinguished by its intravaginal branching and long callus hairs that greatly overlap the lower row of lemma hairs. From the R. geniculatum, it can be distinguished by its upper and lower lemma hair rows being equally dense and continuous, and by its long, thin glumes that narrow to a point, and are tipped with a short awn.

R. viride has 2n=24 chromosomes.

== Ecology ==
The rust fungus Uromyces danthoniae, a species found that grows parasitically on the leaves of several Rytidosperma species in New Zealand and Australia, infects Rytidosperma viride. It forms dense clusters of orange-brown aecidia on both surfaces of the leaf.

== Threats ==
R. viride is designated as Not Threatened under the New Zealand Threat Classification System.

== Taxonomy ==
Rytidosperma viride was initially described as Notodanthonia viridis in 1963. The genus Notodanthonia was synonymised with Rytidosperma in Nicora (1973), after it was recognised that they referred to the same group. The genus Notodanthonia was only described in 1963 by Zotov, whereas Rytidosperma was described in 1854 by Steudel. As such, the older name Rytidosperma took priority under the International Code of Nomenclature. Aotearoa/New Zealand species were formally moved to Rytidosperma in 1979, following this view.

=== Etymology ===
Rytidosperma - wrinkled seed, from Greek rhytis (wrinkle) and sperma (seed).

viride - green, lively, borrowed from Latin viridis.

== Gallery ==
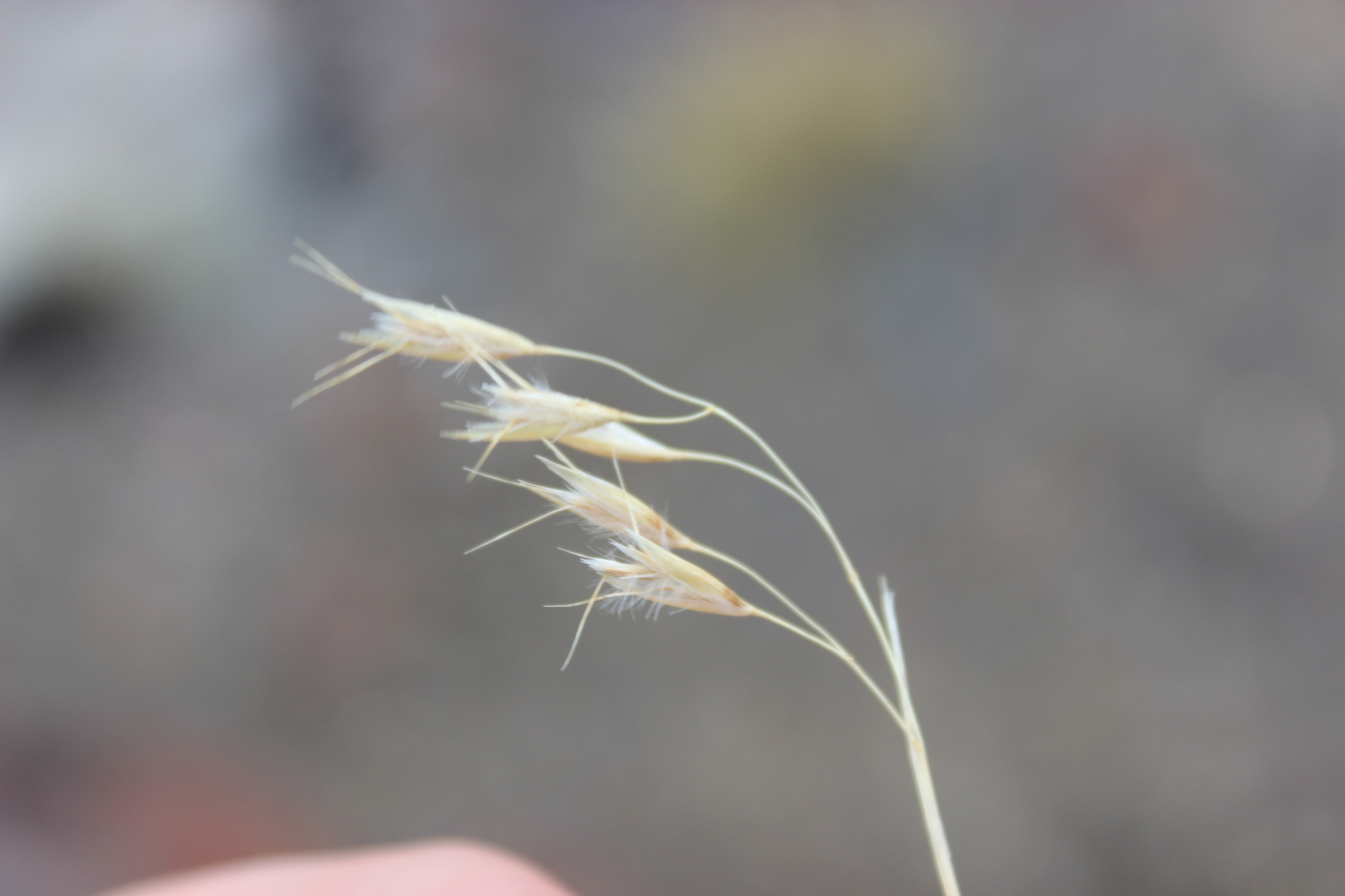
R. viride panicle

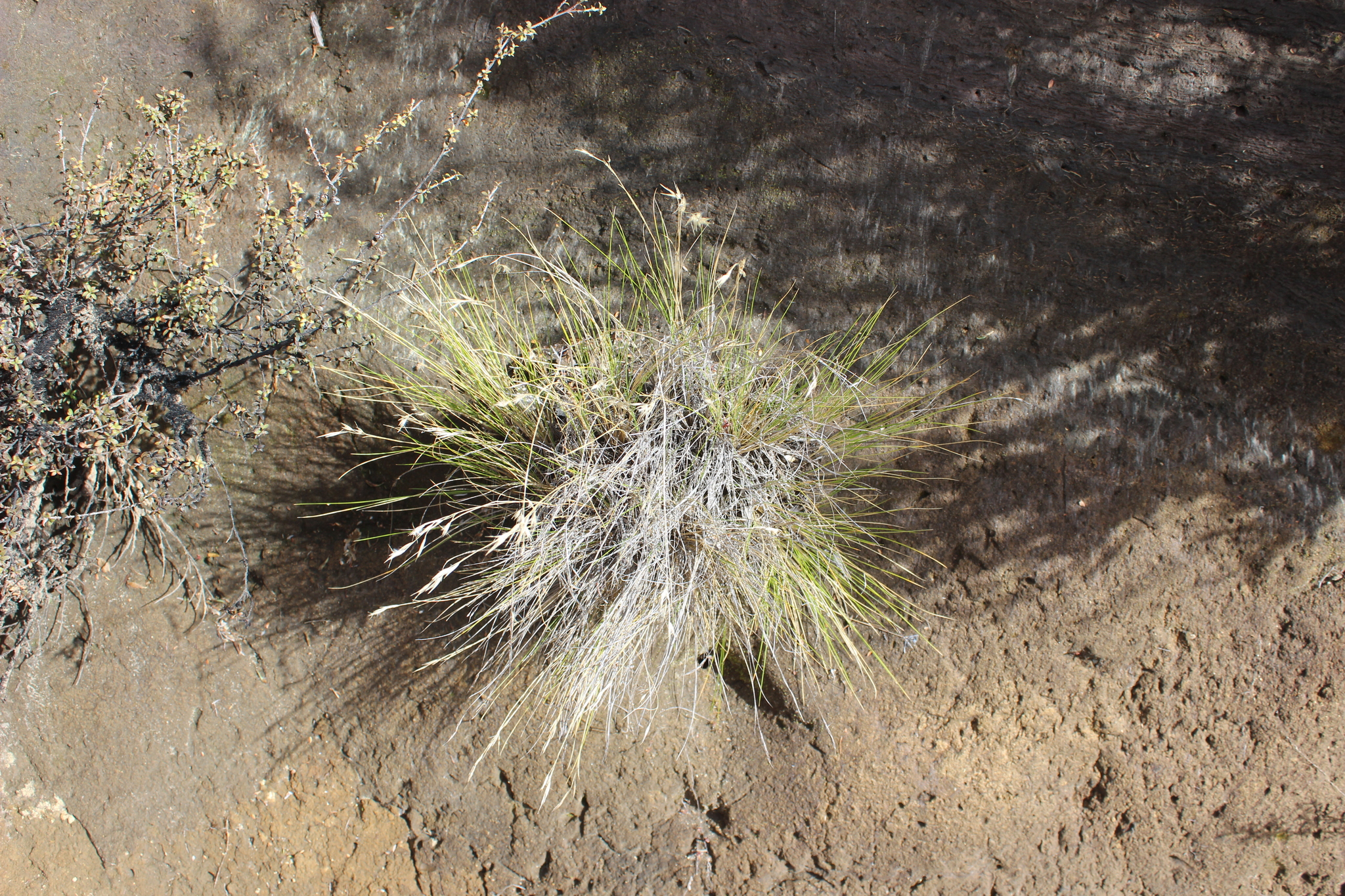
R. viride in habitat

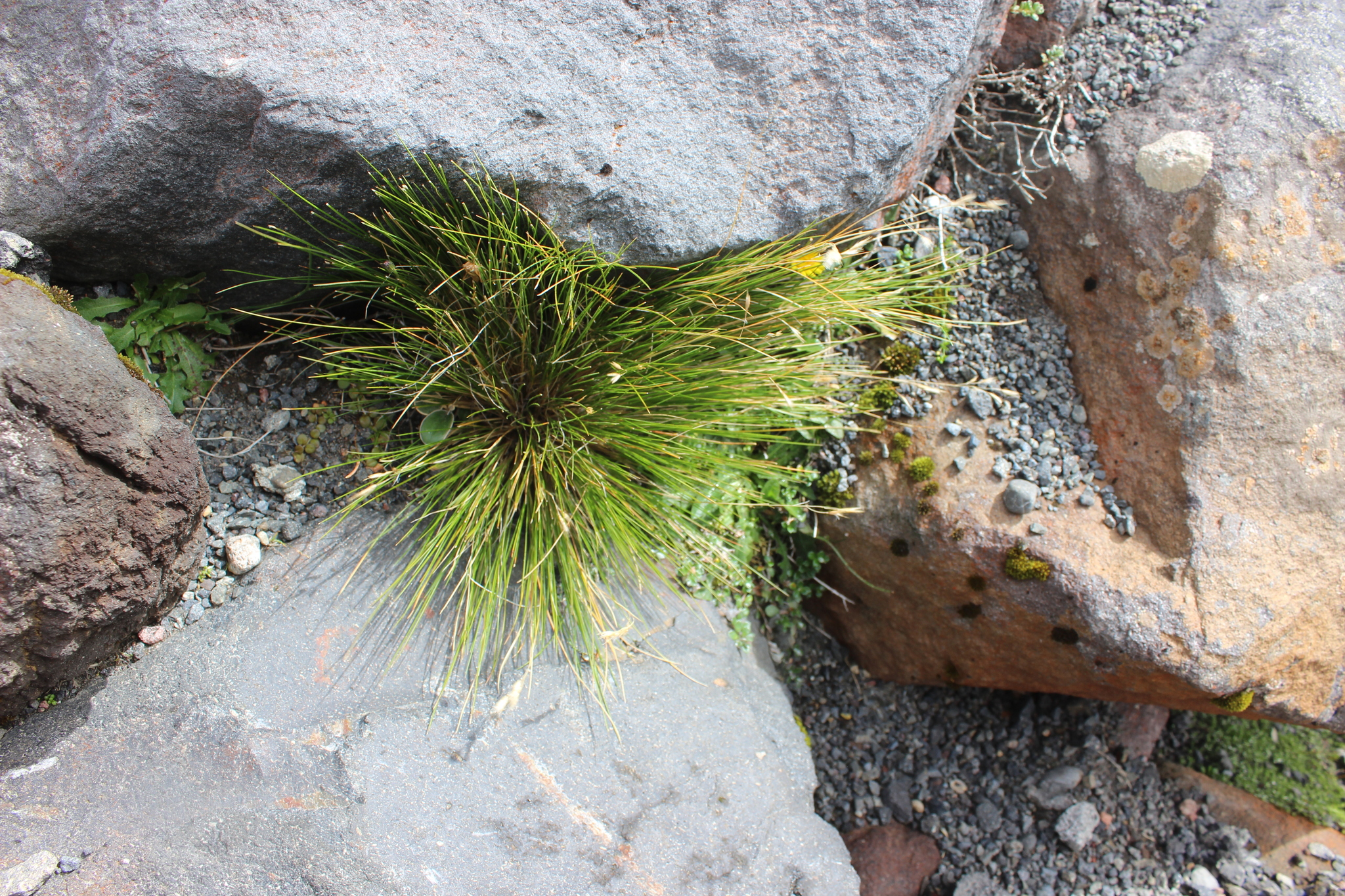
R. viride in habitat
