= Rytidosperma merum =

Scientific classification
- Kingdom: Plantae
- Clade: Tracheophytes
- Clade: Angiosperms
- Clade: Monocots
- Clade: Commelinids
- Order: Poales
- Family: Poaceae
- Genus: Rytidosperma
- Species: R. merum

Binomial name
- Rytidosperma merum Connor & Edgar

Species of plant

Rytidosperma merum or slender bristle grass is a species of true grass in the subfamily Danthonioideae. It is endemic to New Zealand and was described in 1979 by New Zealand botanists Henry Connor and Elizabeth Edgar. Prior to its description, it was known by the tag nam Notodanthonia "naked", referencing the hairless backs of its lemmas.

== Description ==
R. merum is a tufted grass distinctive for its with long, straw-coloured, drooping or trailing culms. Culms are tipped with a raceme with 7-15 spikelets. The spikelets have 4-6 flowers (florets), with awns exserted from glumes. The florets have lobed apexes, and a single awn. The florets contain three rows of hairs, one on the callus, and two on the lemmas. The upper and lower lemma hairs are in small marginal tufts, with the rest of the lemma hairless and shining (hence, the name merum, meaning naked). The callus is short, with lightly tufted hairs that do not reach the lemma hairs.

R. merum is the only Rytidosperma indigenous to New Zealand without a known chromosome count. The base chromosome count of Rytidosperma is 6, which most species having around 2n = 24 chromosomes.

=== Similar species ===
R. merum florets

R. merum is most similar to R. clavatum, R. penicillatum, R. pilosum, and R. racemosum, all of which can sometimes grow together. All five have long lateral lemma lobes and short upper lemma hairs, often in isolated tufts. From R. clavatum, R. penicillatum, and R. pilosum, it is distinguished by its short callus hairs, which don't reach the lower lemma hairs. From R. racemosum, it is distinguished by its particularly reduced lemma hairs, in two pairs of marginal tufts, occasionally with a few single hairs in the lower row, and by the short, stout callus.

=== Identification ===
As a Rytidosperma, the easiest way to identify R. merum is to select a single floret (which will contain a single awn, two lateral lobes, and usually three rows of hairs - one on the callus and two on the lemma). The arrangement of the hairs, as well as the relative lengths of the awn, lateral lobes, sometimes the callus can help identify to species, using a key such as that found in the New Zealand Flora.

The long, trailing culms or R. merum

Unlike most species, R. merum can also be identified by its long, trailing culms.

== Distribution ==
R. merum is endemic to New Zealand, and is found in the North and South Islands. In the North, it is found in the Kaimanawa Mountains, Rangitikei Valley, eastern Wairarapa, and in the Aorangi Range. In the South Island, it is found in Central Otago, the Canterbury plains, Awatere Valley, Molesworth Station, Clarence Valley, Waiau, Greymouth, and Ashburton.

== Habitat ==
A roadside remnant population of R. merum

R. merum is found in dry, unimproved grasslands. It is often found growing with other dryland grasses, such as blue wheat grass (Anthosachne scabra), sweet vernal grass (Anthoxanthum odoratum), browntop (Agrostis capillaris), as well as other Rytidosperma species (like R. clavatum, R. racemosum, and R. pilosum).

At one site in Christchurch, it is described growing with the exotic grasses Rytidosperma racemosum, Agrostis capillaris, and Cynosurus cristatus, and the indigenous grass Rytidosperma clavatum, as well as the exotic forbs Erodium moschatum, Trifolium subterraneum, Plantago lanceolata, and Veronica arvensis.

Due to agricultural intensification, many R. merum populations now occur only as remnants on roadsides.

== Threats ==
R. merum is classified as At Risk - Declining. It is uncommon throughout its range, with the largest threat being habitat loss caused by the agricultural intensification of dry grassland. Dry grassland is a fairly unproductive landtype, so as time passes, farmers have increasing irrigated and fertilised their grasslands, while oversowing and top dressing to encourage more productive exotic species such as cocksfoot (Dactylis glomerata) and perennial ryegrass (Lolium perenne), as well as red clover (Trifolium pratense), white clover (Trifolium repens) to dominate.

Many Rytidosperma merum populations now occur isolated on the edges of roadsides or in small remnant blocks of dry grassland.

== Taxonomy ==
=== Etymology ===
Rytidosperma: 'wrinkled seed' from the Greek 'rhytidos' = wrinkled and 'sperma' = seed

merum: from merus, Latin for bare or naked, describing the hairless back of the lemma.
