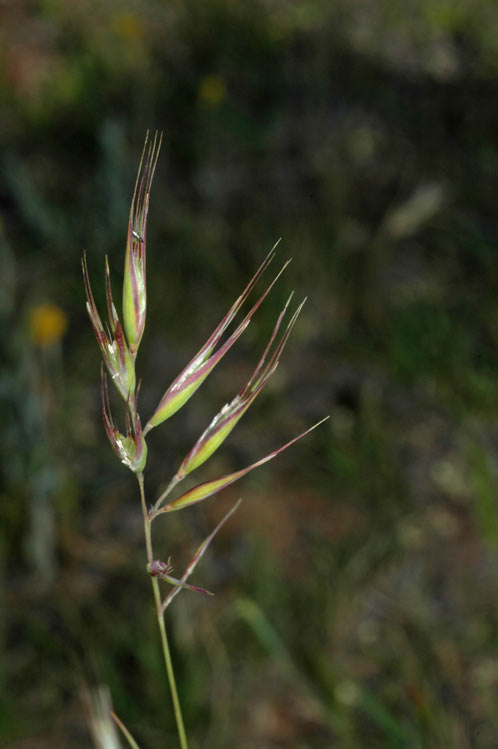
- Flowerhead

Scientific classification
- Kingdom: Plantae
- Clade: Tracheophytes
- Clade: Angiosperms
- Clade: Monocots
- Clade: Commelinids
- Order: Poales
- Family: Poaceae
- Genus: Rytidosperma
- Species: R. erianthum

Binomial name
- Rytidosperma erianthum (Lindl.) Connor & Edgar

Synonyms
- Austrodanthonia eriantha (Lindl.) H.P.Linder; Danthonia eriantha Lindl.; Danthonia periantha Brongn. & Guillaumin; Notodanthonia eriantha (Lindl.) Veldkamp

= Rytidosperma erianthum =

Hill wallaby grass

Species of plant

Rytidosperma erianthum, the hill wallaby grass, is a perennial species of grass found in south eastern Australia. Usually found in drier areas in a variety of habitats. The habit is somewhat variable, erect and densely tufted. The grass may grow up to 0.7 m (2 ft 4 in) tall.

== Description ==
Rytidosperma erianthum is an erect, densely tufted perennial up to 0.7 m (2 ft 4 in) high.

Stem bearing the inflorescence, or culm, is smooth, 3-noded. Leaves generally with soft hairs with a small wart-like outgrowth (tubercle) at the base of hairs. Leaf blade fine, rolled in, or rarely almost flat, to 25 cm (9.8 in) long and usually less than 1 mm (0.039 in) wide.

Compound inflorescence (panicle) which is ovate in shape, compact or loose, 2 cm (0.79 in) to 7 cm (2.8 in) long. Inflorescence has 4 to 15 spikelets, which are each flower together with lemma and palea that enclose it. Spikelets green-tinged with purple and are 4–8-flowered, 11 mm (0.43 in) to 18 mm (0.71 in) long. Glumes (bracts at the base of the grass spikelet) subequal, tapering gradually to a point, 11 mm (0.43 in) to 19 mm (0.75 in) long. Lemma rather broad, 3 mm (0.12 in) to 4 mm (0.16 in) long, with 2 rows of hairs, the lower about 1 mm (0.039 in) above the hardened extension from the base of a floret (callus) tuft, and virtually reaching the dense upper ring, the hairs of which normally exceed the twisted part of the central awn. Lateral lobes erect or slightly spreading, 7 mm (0.28 in) to 11 mm (0.43 in) long, abruptly tapering into fine hairs which are about as long as or longer than the flat part. Central awn exceeding lateral lobes by 3 mm (0.12 in) to 8 mm (0.31 in). Palea obovate in shape, the margin with conspicuous hairs, exceeding sinus by about 1 mm (0.039 in). Flowers occur from September to December.

== Taxonomy ==
Rytidosperma erianthum was first described by the botanist John Lindley as Danthonia eriantha in 1838. The holotype was collected by Major Mitchell, during his expedition of 1836 in present-day southern New South Wales. Based on expedition maps, the collection likely occurred near The Rock. Major Mitchell described the species as "a new kind of grass with large seeds".

In 1841, French botanists Brongniart and Guillemin mistakenly named Danthonia eriantha as Danthonia periantha (orthographical variant). New Zealand botanists Connor and Edgar placed Danthonia eriantha into the genus Rytidosperma as Rytidosperma erianthum in 1979. Further changes were put forward by botanists including, Veldkamp in 1980 proposing a new combination Notodanthonia eriantha, and in 1997 Linder proposing the new combination Austrodanthonia eriantha. However, Rytidosperma erianthum is the current accepted name.
