= Uromyces danthoniae =

Scientific classification
- Kingdom: Fungi
- Division: Basidiomycota
- Class: Pucciniomycetes
- Order: Pucciniales
- Family: Pucciniaceae
- Genus: Uromyces
- Species: U. danthoniae

Binomial name
- Uromyces danthoniae McAlpine

Uromyces danthoniae is a rust fungus in the family Pucciniaceae (the rust family), described in 1906 by Australian mycologist Daniel McAlpine. It is native to Aotearoa/New Zealand and Australia, and grows only on Rytidosperma sp. (which were formerly grouped with Danthonia).

== Description ==
The aecidia on of U. danthoniae on Rytidosperma are found on both surfaces of the leaf, arranged in dense clusters. The margin of the pseudoperidium (a membranous cup enclosing the aeciospores) is regular and very finely toothed, and the aeciospores are considerably smaller.

== Distribution ==
Uromyces danthoniae was originally known from the vicinity of Melbourne, Victoria, as well as Hobart, Australia. It is now known from throughout Australia, Tasmania, and New Zealand.

The lectotype was collected on Rytidosperma penicillatum in Killara, Australia on the 9th October 1902.

== Ecology ==
Uromyces danthoniae, a parasite on Rytidosperma, is itself parasitised by the fungus Darluca filum, a mycoparasitic fungus of many rust fungi.

=== Hosts of U. danthoniae ===
Uromyces danthoniae has not been found on species other than Rytidosperma, and as such is believed to be autoecious ( passing through all life stages on the same host). U. dantoniae used to be recorded from Chionochloa cunninghami, C. flavescens, and C. setifolia, however these specimens have now been reassigned to Uromyces mcnabii. Today, Uromyces danthoniae has been recorded parasitising on all of the following species:

- Rytidosperma biannulare (Zotov) Connor & Edgar
- Rytidosperma caespitosum (Gaudich.) Connor & Edgar
- Rytidosperma clavatum (Zotov) Connor & Edgar
- Rytidosperma gracile (Hook.f.) Connor & Edgar
- Rytidosperma pilosum (R. Br.) Connor et Edgar
- Rytidosperma penicillatum (Labill.) Connor & Edgar
- Rytidosperma racemosum (R.Br.) Connor & Edgar
- Rytidosperma setifolium (Hook.f.) Connor & Edgar
- Rytidosperma tenuius (Steudel) A. Hansen et Sunding
- Rytidosperma unarede (Raoul) Connor et Edgar
- Rytidosperma viride (Zotov) Connor & Edgar

However, in 2024, a new species, Uromyces rytidospermatis was described, which was previously erroneously included within U. danthoniae. Thus, some of these occurrences may belong to this species.
