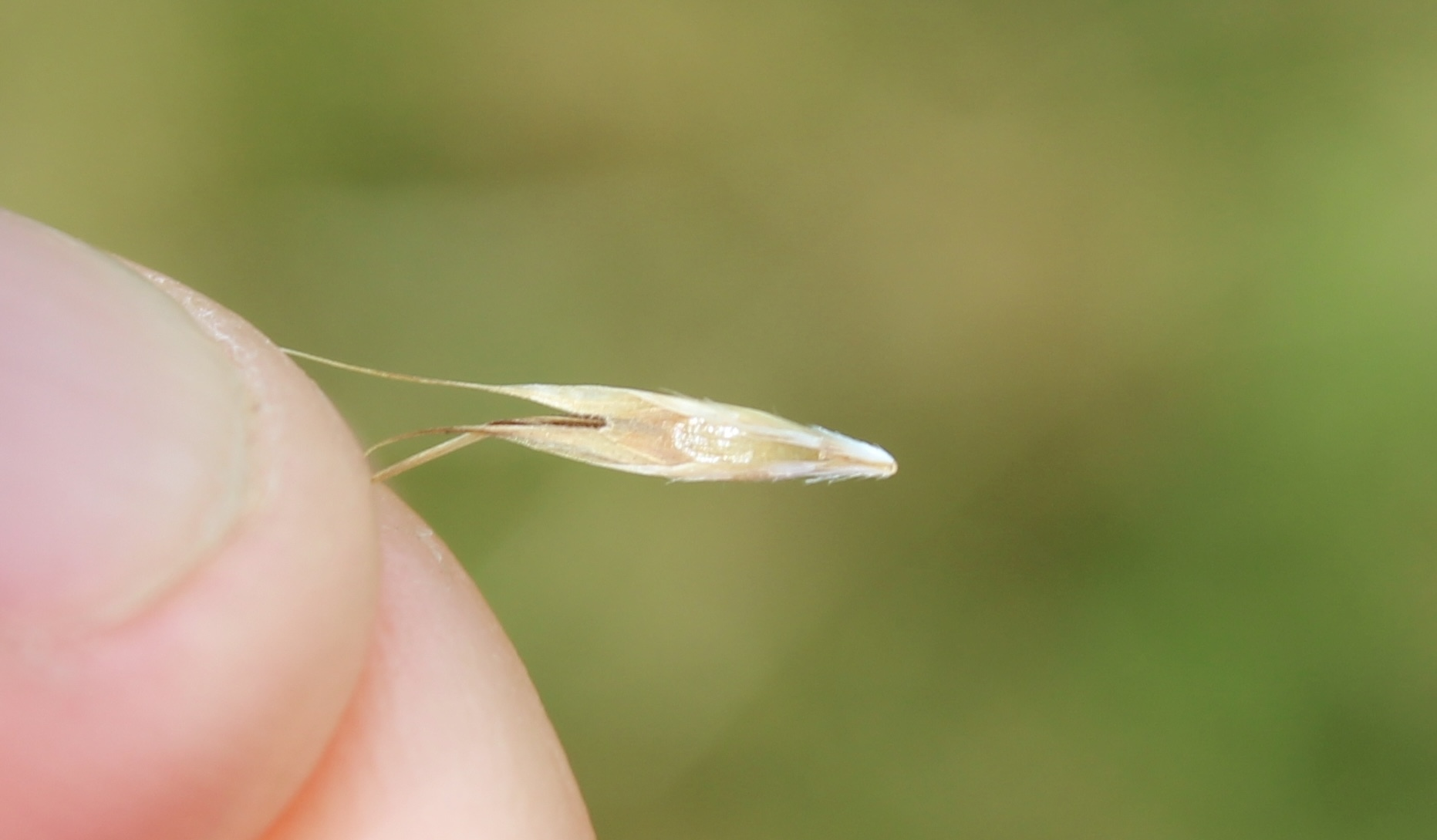

Scientific classification
- Kingdom: Plantae
- Clade: Tracheophytes
- Clade: Angiosperms
- Clade: Monocots
- Clade: Commelinids
- Order: Poales
- Family: Poaceae
- Genus: Rytidosperma
- Species: R. clavatum

Binomial name
- Rytidosperma clavatum (Zotov) Connor & Edgar

= Rytidosperma clavatum =

Species of plant

Rytidosperma clavatum is a species of true grass in the subfamily Danthonioideae. It is endemic to New Zealand and was described as Notodanthonia clavata in 1963 by Russian-New Zealand botanist Victor Zotov.

== Description ==
R. clavatum is a shortly rhizomatous grass forming spreading tufts, with extravaginal branching. Its leaf-sheaths are light grey-brown. Its inflorescences are organised in racemes or racemose panicles, on culms up to 90cm. The spikelets comprise 5-10 fertile florets with awns clearly emerging from glumes. The florets have lobed apexes, and a single awn. The florets contain three rows of hairs, one on the callus, and two often marginal tufts on the lemmas. The upper lemma hairs are marginal tufts longer or equal to the lemma, but well exceeded by the lateral lemma lobes. The lower row is short, barely or not reaching the upper lemma hairs. The lemmas are otherwise glabrous and shining. The callus hairs overlap the lower lemma hairs. The awn is flat at the base of its sinus and concealing top of palea, which is usually longer than it.

=== Identification ===
As a Rytidosperma, the easiest way to identify R. clavatum is to select a single floret (which will contain a single awn, two lateral lobes, and usually three rows of hairs - one on the callus and two on the lemma). The arrangement of the hairs, as well as the relative lengths of the awn, lateral lobes, sometimes the callus can help identify to species, using a key such as that found in the New Zealand Flora.

=== Similar species ===
R. clavatum is very similar to the exotic R. racemosum. R. clavatum differs by its blunt, broad-tipped sinus (c.f. a long, tapered sinus) and by the callus hairs which overlap the lower row of lemma hairs (c.f. rarely reaching the lower lemma hairs). According to Zotov, intermediate forms between R. clavatum and R. racemosum occur in the North Island and occasionally in the South Island. Colenso's holotype for Danthonia nervosa from Hawke's Bay was apparently one of these putative hybrids.

R. clavatum is also similar to R. penicillatum. R. clavatum differs by its contracted panicle (c.f. elongated panicle), and by its lemma awn column which is usually flat at the base of the sinus and concealing the top of the palea.

It has the ploidy of 2n = 24.

== Distribution ==
R. clavatum is endemic to New Zealand, found in the North Island south of Auckland, throughout the South Island east of the main divide, and on the Chatham Islands. In 2007, a new northernmost record was found at Great Barrier Island, in the Hauraki Gulf.

R. clavatum was apparently sown over extensive areas of hill pastures early in the 1900s, under the name Danthonia pilosa.

Zotov collected the specimen he listed as a holotype in a railway cutting in Upper Hutt on the 12th December 1952.

== Habitat and ecology ==
R. clavatum is a grass open, dry areas in lowland and montane zones. It is often found on rock outcrops surrounded by pasture.

=== Associated species ===
In Tongariro National Park, R. clavatum is described as growing in habitat dominated by dwarf shrubs Dracophyllum recurvum, Gaultheria colensoi and Calluna vulgaris with herbs Anisotome aromatica and Celmisia spectabilis. On the Waimakariri and Rakaia floodplains, R. clavatum is associated with Discaria toumatou, Olearia adenocarpa, Austrostipa nodosa, Anthoxanthum odoratum, Rumex acetosella, and Racomitrium curiosissimum.

=== Parasites and herbivores ===
The rust fungus Uromyces danthoniae, a species found that grows parasitically on the leaves of several Rytidosperma species in New Zealand and Australia, infects Rytidosperma viride. It forms dense clusters of orange-brown aecidia on both surfaces of the leaf.

The phytopathogenic fungus Colletotrichum graminicola is recorded growing on the senescing leaves of R. clavatum. The smut fungi Sphaerodothis danthoniae and Ustilago agropyri have also been recorded on R. clavatum.

R. clavatum is eaten by sheep, cattle, and rabbits.

== Threats ==
R. clavatum is ranked as Not Threatened, however, it may be vulnerable to stock (sheep and cattle) and rabbits. It is ranked as Regionally Data Deficient in Auckland.

== Taxonomy ==
In Zotov's 1963 paper, he described Notodanthonia clavata and Notodanthonia stricta (which itself was based on Buchanan's Danthonia pilosa var. stricta). Edgar and Connor synonymised these two taxa. Because they were both described in the same year, either could take priority, but Notodanthonia clavata was more widespread.

Zotov collected the specimen he listed as a holotype in a railway cutting in Upper Hutt on the 12th December 1952. Edgar and Connor list a different specimen, collected at Hawkston in Hawke's Bay by Thomas Hallett, between 1894-95 as the holotype. However, that specimen is the type of Colenso's Danthonia nervosa, which Zotov believed was a putative hybrid between R. racemosum and R. racemosum.

The genus Notodanthonia was synonymised with Rytidosperma in Nicora (1973), after it was recognised that they referred to the same group. The genus Notodanthonia was only described in 1963 by Zotov, whereas Rytidosperma was described in 1854 by Steudel. As such, the older name Rytidosperma took priority under the International Code of Nomenclature. In 1979, New Zealand botanists Henry Connor and Elizabeth Edgar moved the whole Notodanthonia genus to Rytidosperma, following Nicora (1973), and named the species Rytidosperma clavatum.

=== Etymology ===
Rytidosperma: 'wrinkled seed' from the Greek 'rhytidos' = wrinkled and 'sperma' = seed

clavatum, from the Latin clavatus, meaning ‘club-shaped’.

== Gallery ==
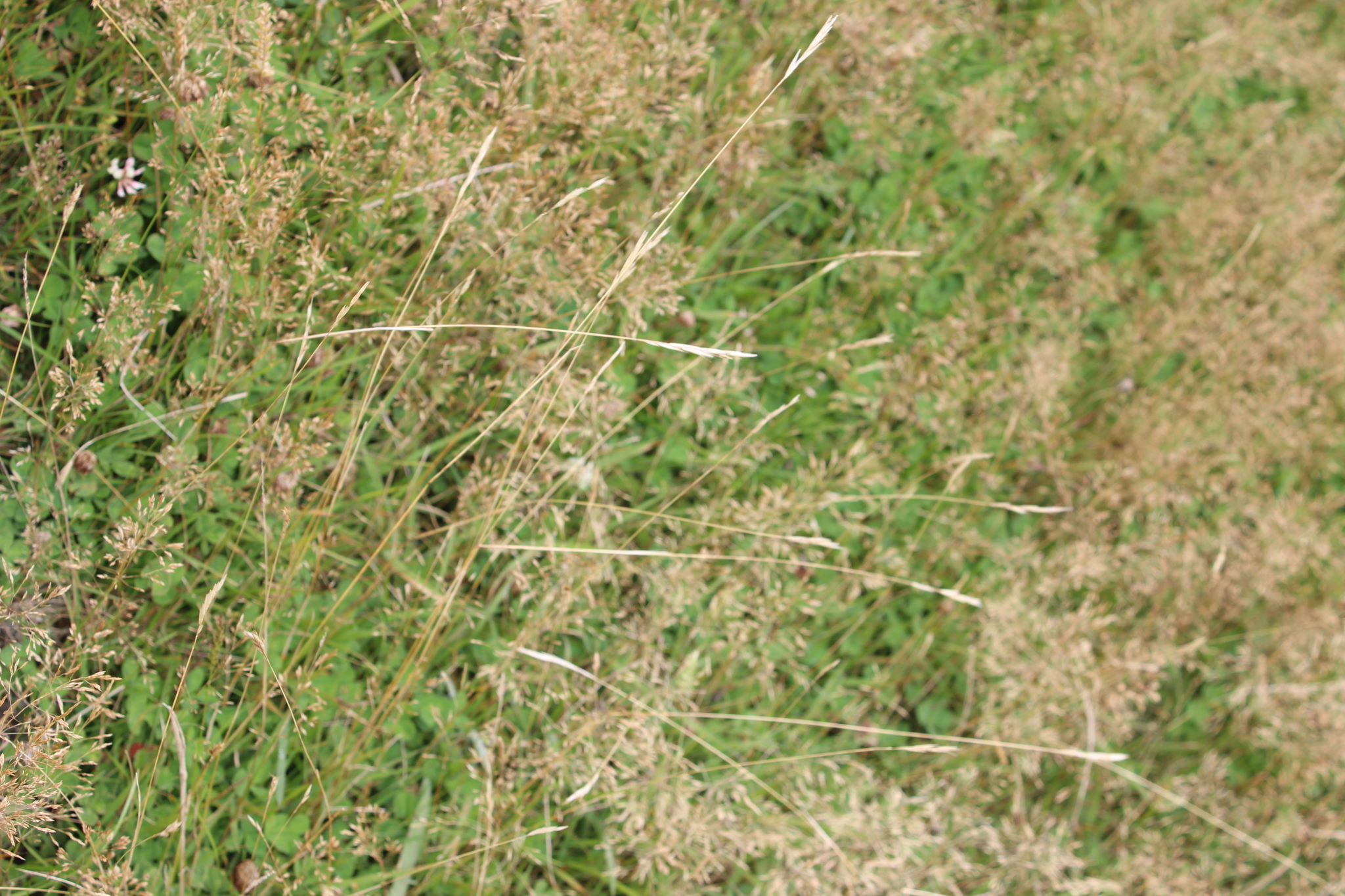
R. clavatum in browntop grassland

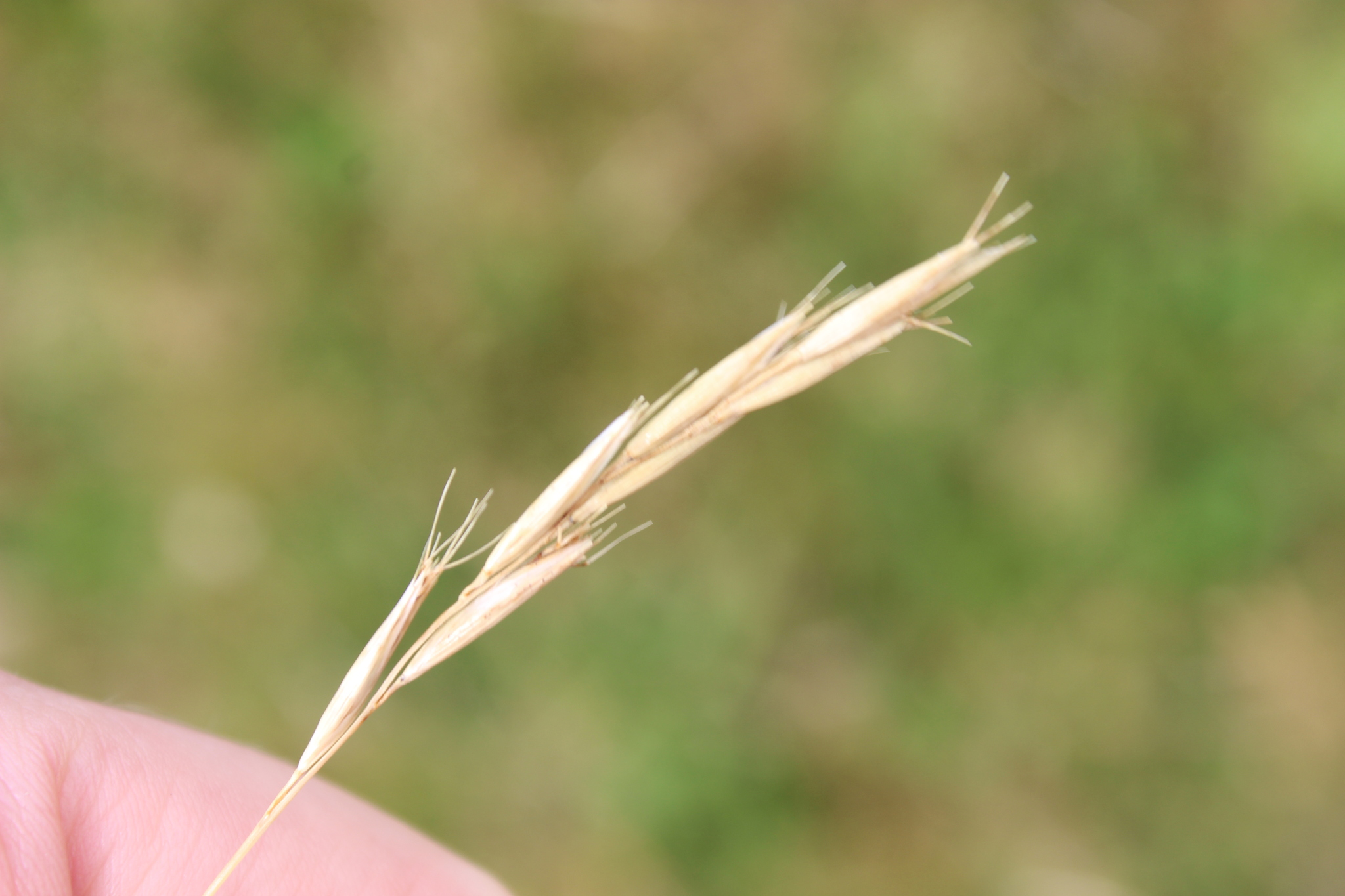
R. clavatum panicle
