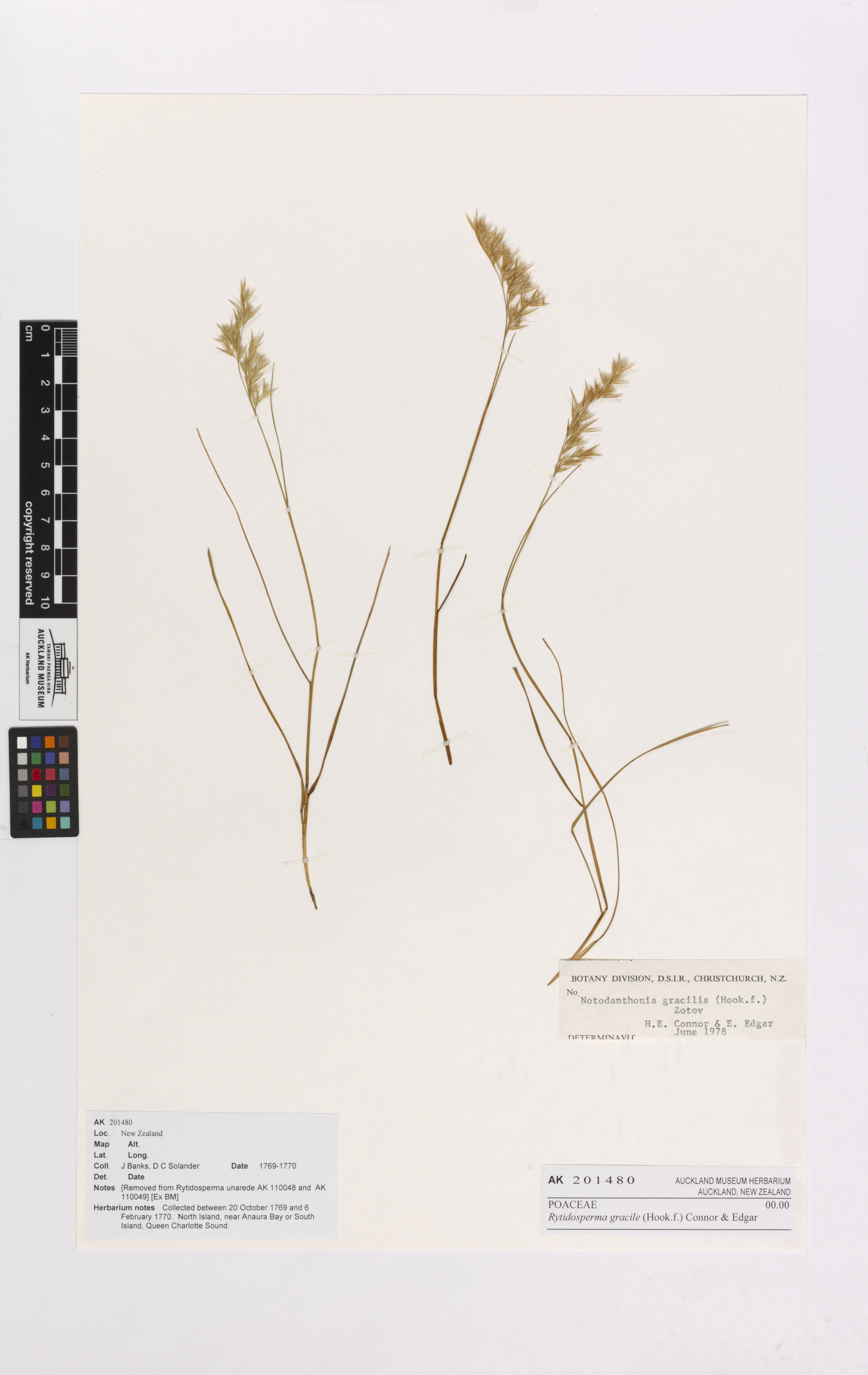

Conservation status
- Not Threatened (NZ TCS)

Scientific classification
- Kingdom: Plantae
- Clade: Tracheophytes
- Clade: Angiosperms
- Clade: Monocots
- Clade: Commelinids
- Order: Poales
- Family: Poaceae
- Genus: Rytidosperma
- Species: R. gracile

Binomial name
- Rytidosperma gracile (Hook.f.) Connor & Edgar

= Rytidosperma gracile =

Species of plant

Rytidosperma gracile, also known as forest fairy grass and dainty bristle grass (New Zealand), or dainty wallaby grass (Australia) is a species of true grass in the subfamily Danthonioideae. It is indigenous to New Zealand and Australia and was described in the Handbook of New Zealand Flora as Danthonia gracilis in 1853 by Joseph Dalton Hooker.

== Distribution ==
R. gracile is indigenous to New Zealand and Australia and introduced and naturalised in Hawaii, USA.

=== Indigenous range ===
In New Zealand, it is found throughout the North, South, Stewart and Chatham Islands. In the South Island, it is only occasional in inland basins and plains in Canterbury and Otago, but is common elsewhere.

In Australia, it is present in Tasmania and New South Wales (although, the NSW flora lists no specimens). In Tasmania, R. gracile is mainly found in the west coast highlands.

=== Exotic range ===
R. gracile was identified as naturalized on Haleakalā, Maui Island in Hawaii from 900–2440 meters above sea level for the first time in 2025. It had been present there since 1937 but had been confused with R. biannulare, R. caespitosum, and R. semiannularis. R. gracile may have arrived within 12 accessions of Rytidosperma imported by the Hawaii Agricultural Experiment Station (HAES) from 1913–1937, or in seeds imported accidentally with hay.

=== Type specimen ===
No type is designated in the original description by Hooker, but it is cited as present in Matakitaki Valley. Therefore, Zotov designated a lectotype, collected in February 1851, Rotoiti Lake, Aglionby Plains (an old name for Matakitaki Valley). The earliest collection was in Totaranui, Queen Charlotte Sound, collected by Banks and Solander onboard the HMS Endeaver, in 1769-70.

== Description ==
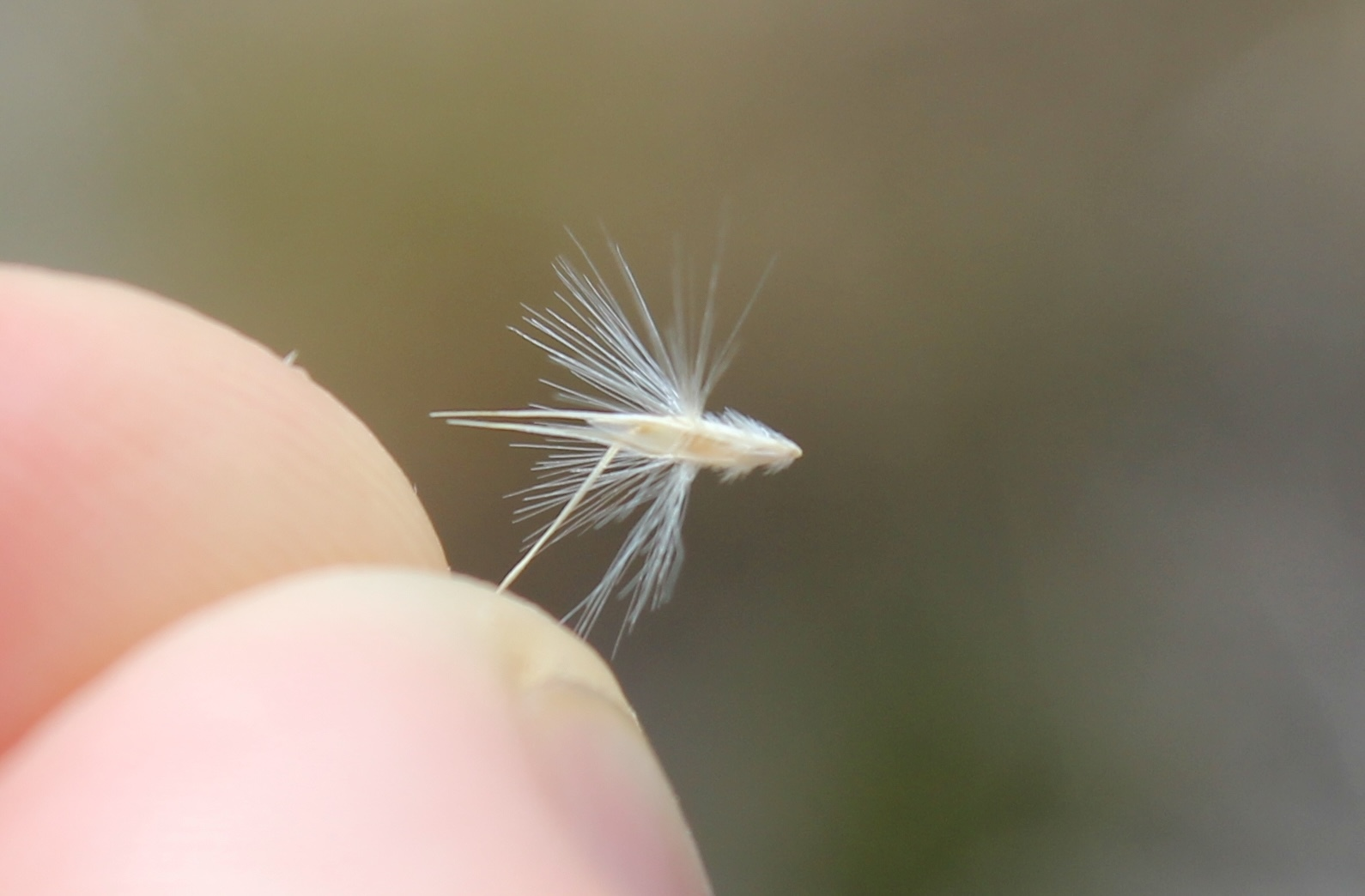
R. gracile floret from below, showing long upper lemma hairs, short lower lemma and callus hairs, and numerous hairs elsewhere on the lemma.

R. gracile is a perennial, tufted grass with extravaginal young shoots. Its leaf-sheaths are covered in pilose hairs. Its inflorescences are organised in open panicles, 5–10 cm long. The spikelets comprise 3–4(–6) fertile florets. The lemma has lobed apexes, and a single awn. The florets contain three obvious rows of hairs, one on the callus, and two on the lemmas. The upper lemma hairs are continuous and conspicuous, at least twice as long as the lemma, and a similar length to the lemma lobes. The lower lemma hairs are not-well defined, don't reach the upper lemma hairs. There are always numerous hairs between the lemma rows. The callus hairs are short and tufted, not reaching the lower lemma row.

=== Identification ===
As a Rytidosperma, the easiest way to identify R. buchananii is to select a single floret (which will contain a single awn, two lateral lobes, and usually three rows of hairs - one on the callus and two on the lemma). The arrangement of the hairs, as well as the relative lengths of the awn, lateral lobes, sometimes the callus can help identify to species, using a key such as that found in the New Zealand Flora.

=== Similar species ===
R. gracile can be distinguished from most other Rytidosperma species by the long upper lemma hairs and very short lower lemma and callus hairs.

In New Zealand, R. gracile is most similar to R. nigricans, but is distinguished by the short hairs between the two rows of lemma hairs and by the awn column which is overtopped or equal to the tip of palea. In comparison, R. nigricans is naked between the two rows of hairs and has an awn column that exceeds or is equal to the tip of the palea.

In Australia, R. gracile is most closely related to R. semiannulare, from which it is identified by its extravaginal innovation buds, and by the long hairs on the leaf-sheaths. It apparently occupies wetter habitats. The two taxa are never found together, but both occur in Tasmania.

== Habitat ==
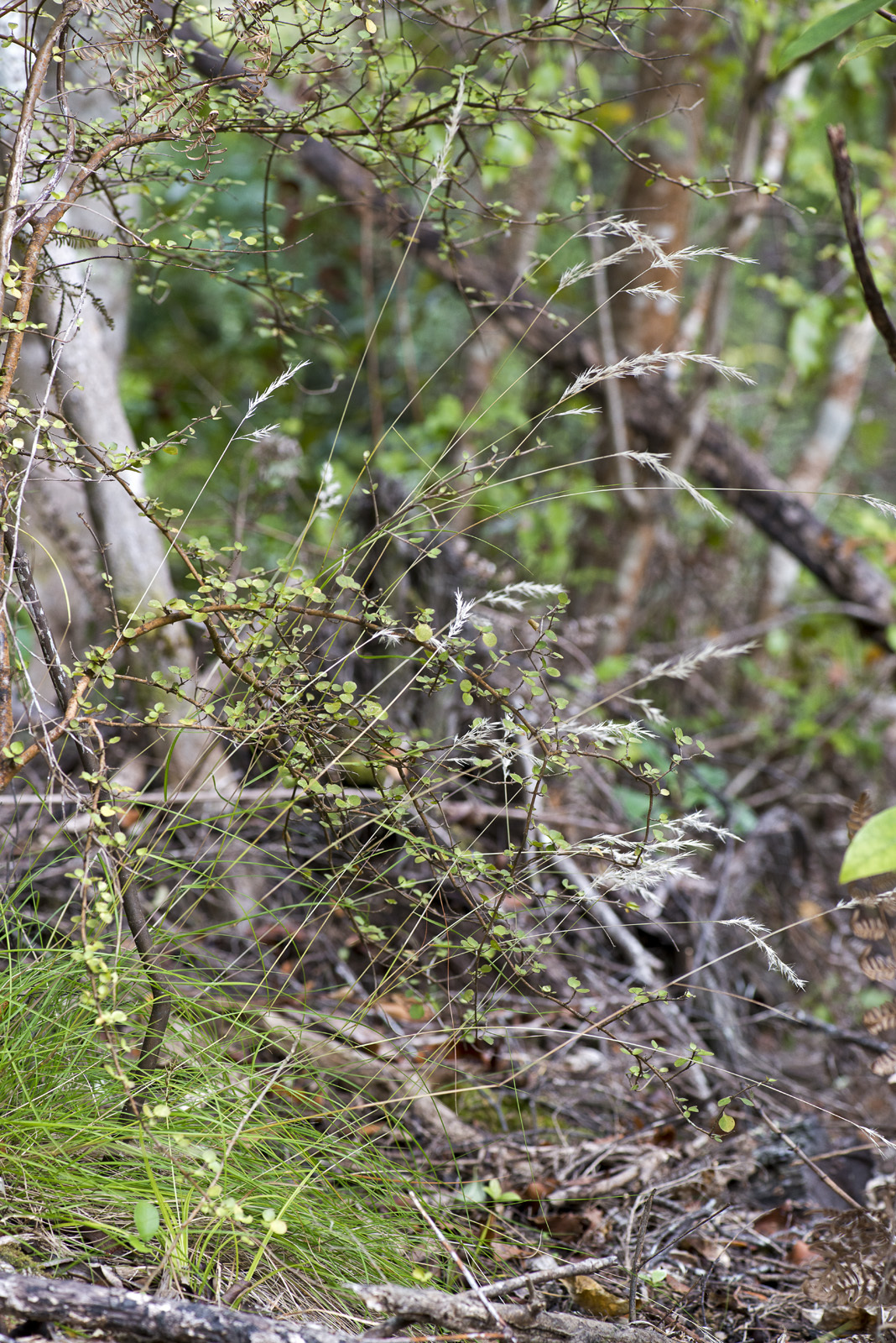
R. gracile is beech forest

In Australia, R. gracile is described as being local along damp, mossy margins of rainforest. In New Zealand, R. gracile is extremely widespread, growing in stream banks and exposed rocky places in forests, in sparse shrubland and scrub, as well as in open grassland and modified sites in lowland to alpine zones.

R. gracile is a diagnostic species in the frostflat heathland of the Rangitaiki basin in the Central Plateau of the North Island of New Zealand. It is found in between 68-80% of vegetation plots, along with Dracophyllum subulatum and Poa cita. R. gracile is particularly common in beech forest, such as the black beech forests of the southern North Island, where it often grows on clay banks with species like Pentapogon avenoides.

== Ecology ==
The rust fungus Uromyces danthoniae, a species found that grows parasitically on the leaves of several Rytidosperma species in New Zealand and Australia, infects Rytidosperma gracile. It forms dense clusters of orange-brown aecidia on both surfaces of the leaf. R. gracile is also the host of the other leaf rust fungi Uromyces rytidospermatis, described in 2024.

R. gracile is also the host of Sphaerodothella danthoniae, a sac fungus that produces black, shiny leaf spots that occasionally coalesce into straight to irregular lines in the leaf surface of Rytidosperma.

In New Zealand R. gracile flowers from October to May, and fruits from November to July, peaking in February.

== Threats ==
R. gracile is designated as Not Threatened under the New Zealand Threat Classification System.

== Taxonomy ==
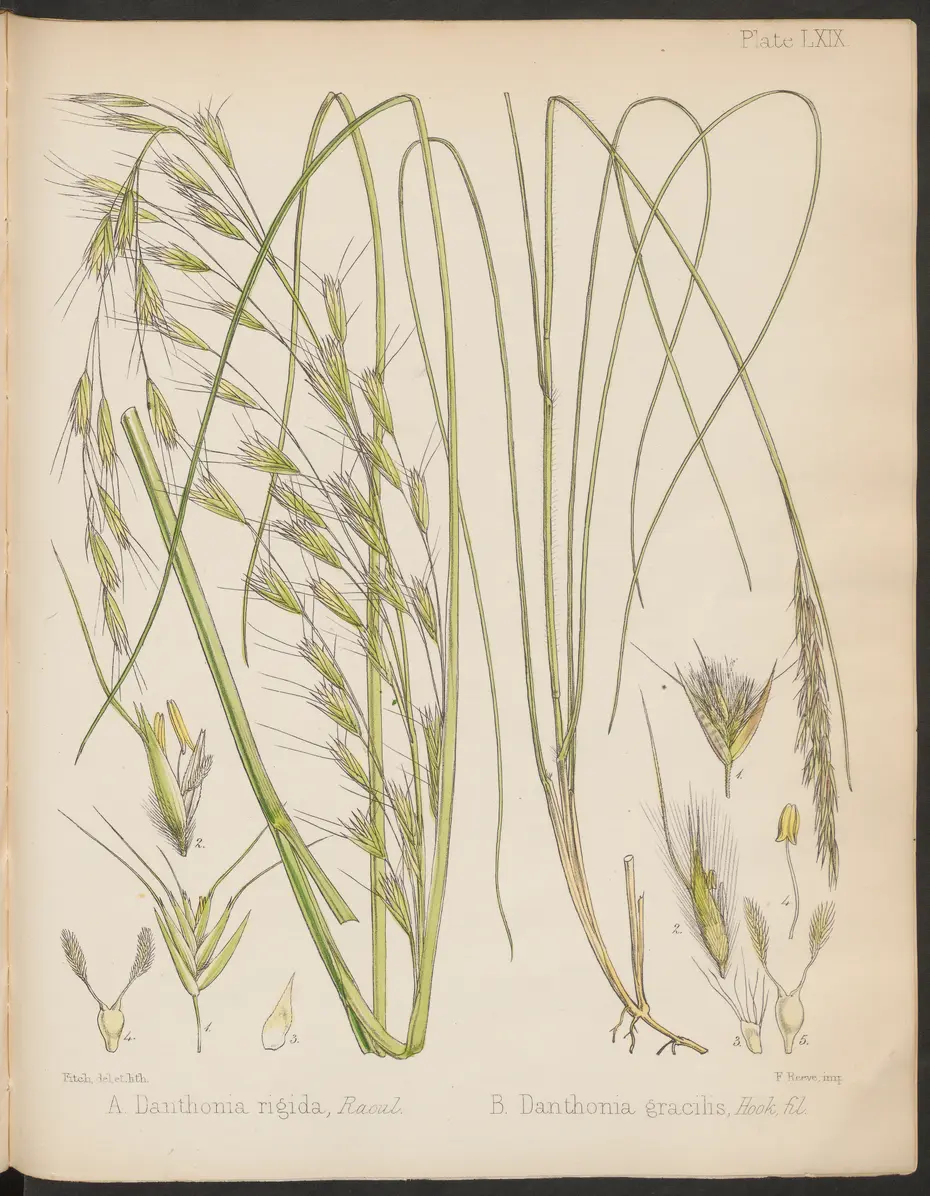
The plate accompanying the original R. gracile description from 1854. On right, next to Chionochloa rigida.

R. gracile was described in the Handbook of New Zealand Flora as Danthonia gracilis in 1853 by Joseph Dalton Hooker. In 1864, he moved the species to a varietal rank under Danthonia semiannularis as var. gracilis. The species remained at this rank until 1963 when Russian-New Zealand botanist Victor Zotov reinstated it as a full species, under the name Notodanthonia gracilis.

The genus Notodanthonia was synonymised with Rytidosperma in Nicora (1973), after it was recognised that they referred to the same group. The genus Notodanthonia was only described in 1963 by Zotov, whereas Rytidosperma was described in 1854 by Steudel. As such, the older name Rytidosperma took priority under the International Code of Nomenclature. In 1979, New Zealand botanists Henry Connor and Elizabeth Edgar moved the whole Notodanthonia genus to Rytidosperma, following Nicora (1973), and named the species Rytidosperma gracile.

=== Etymology ===
Rytidosperma: 'wrinkled seed' from the Greek 'rhytidos' = wrinkled and 'sperma' = seed

gracile - Latin for slender, referring to the slender culms and inflorescences.

== Gallery ==
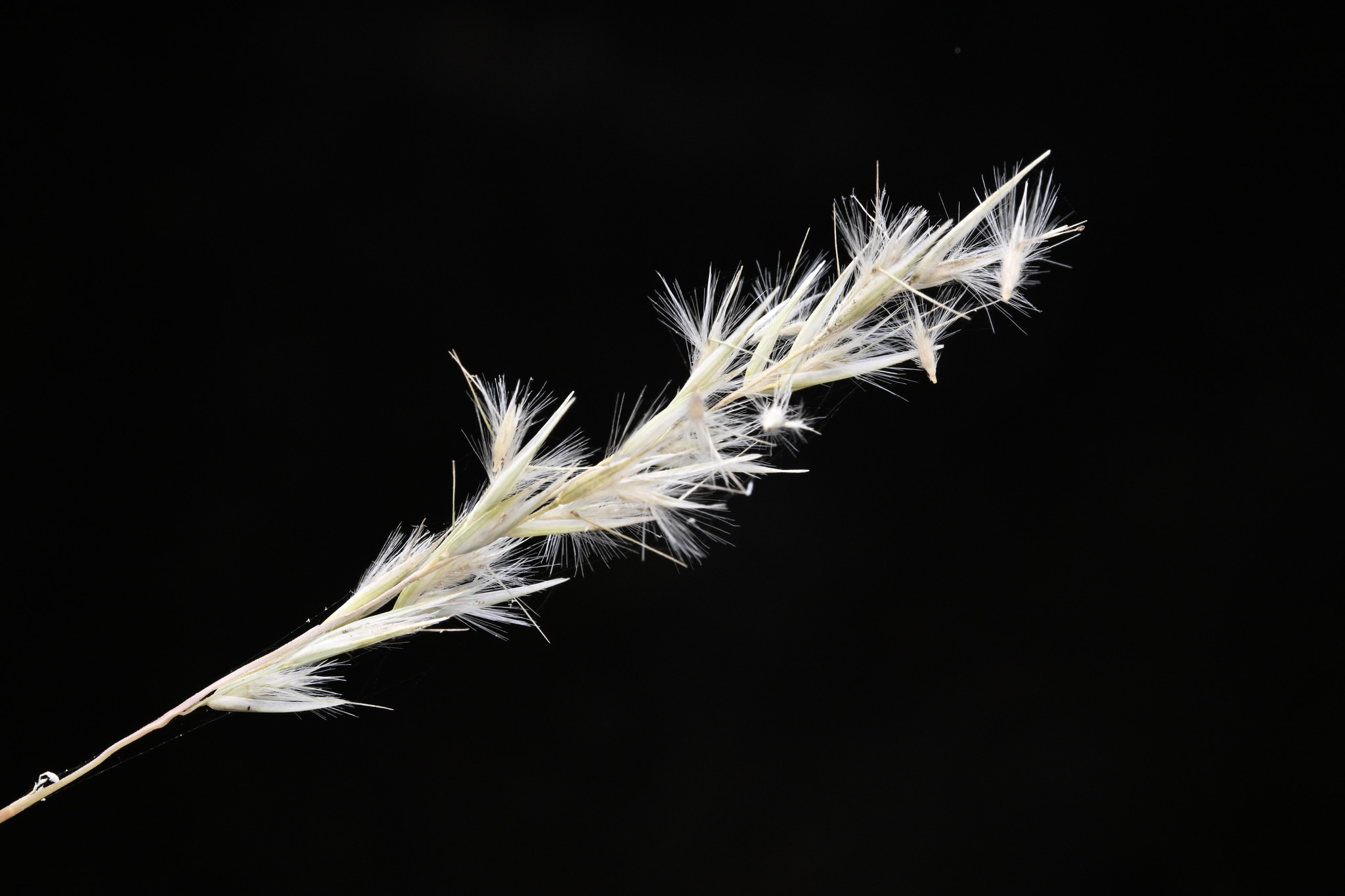
R. gracile open panicle

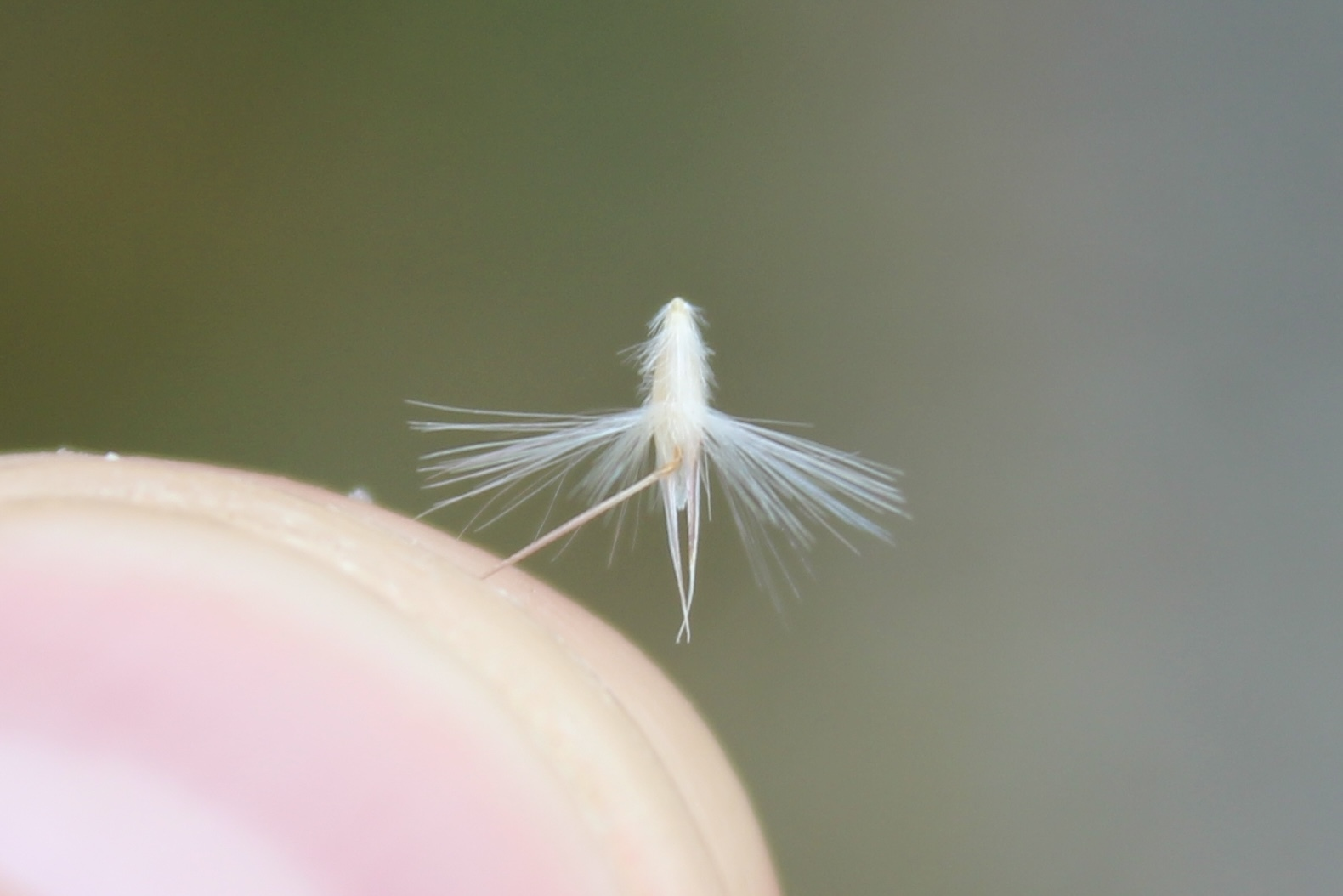
R. gracile floret from above
