= Rytidosperma nigricans =

Scientific classification
- Kingdom: Plantae
- Clade: Tracheophytes
- Clade: Angiosperms
- Clade: Monocots
- Clade: Commelinids
- Order: Poales
- Family: Poaceae
- Genus: Rytidosperma
- Species: R. nigricans

Binomial name
- Rytidosperma nigricans (Petrie) Connor & Edgar

Species of plant

Rytidosperma nigricans is a species of true grass in the subfamily Danthonioideae. It is endemic to New Zealand and was described as Danthonia semiannularis var. nigricans in 1913 by Scottish-New Zealand botanist Donald Petrie.

== Distribution ==
R. nigricans is endemic to New Zealand. In the North Island it is found in the Tararua and Remutaka Ranges. In the South Island it is found from Nelson to Southland mainly along the Main Divide, as well as montane zones to the west and rarely to the east. It is also found on Stewart Island.

=== Type ===
The type was collected by Donald Petrie at Mount Hector, in the Tararua Ranges growing at 900-1200 metres (3000-4000 feet) above sea level on the 29th of Janurary 1907.

== Habitat and Ecology ==
A bog including R. nigricans

R. nigricans grows in montane and alpine zones in wet and boggy sites.

=== Associated species ===
In a wet seepage in limestone mountains in western Nelson, R. nigricans grows with Carpha alpina, Carex flaviformis, Celmisia spp., Euchiton polylepis, Pentachondra pumila, Schoenus pauciflorus and Agrostis dyeri.

R. nigricans grows in cushion bogs in Temple Basin ski field, which are made up of Pentachondra pumila, Kelleria dieffenbachii, Centrolepis ciliata, Austrolycopodium fastigiatum, as well as Carpha alpina, Drosera arcturi and D. spatulata.

At Merrie Range, Fiordland, R. nigricans has been collected from cushion bogs made up of Donatia novae-zelandiae, Oreobolus impar, and Gaimardia setacea.

== Description ==
R. nigricans grows in small, stiffly erect tufts with culms overtopping leaves up to 30 cm, and tipped with a panicle inflorescence. The panicle contains spikelets with 3-4 florets (or flowers), with awns exserted from the glumes, which are dark purplish or black. The lemma 1.5-2.5 mm, with lobed apexes, and a single awn. They contain two obvious rows of hairs, as well as one on the callus. The upper row is continuous, smaller than or equal to the lemma lobes, while the lower row is short. Between the two rows of lemma hairs, the lemma is predominantly glabrous, occasionally with a few isolated hairs. The callus has a few short scattered marginal hairs that don't (or barely) reach the lower lemma hairs.

R. nigricans has 2 n = 24 chromosomes.

R. nigricans floret

=== Identification ===
As a Rytidosperma, the easiest way to identify R. nigricans is to select a single floret (which will contain a single awn, two lateral lobes, and usually three rows of hairs - one on the callus and two on the lemma). The arrangement of the hairs, as well as the relative lengths of the awn, lateral lobes, sometimes the callus can help identify to species, using a key such as that found in the New Zealand Flora.

=== Similar species ===
R. nigricans can be distinguished from most other Rytidosperma species by the long upper lemma hairs and very short lower lemma and callus hairs.

In New Zealand, R. nigricans is most similar to R. gracile, but that species has short hairs between the two rows of lemma hairs and an awn column which is shorter than or equal to the tip of palea. In comparison, R. nigricans is naked between the two rows of hairs and has an awn column that exceeds or is equal to the tip of the palea.

== Threats ==
R. nigricans is designated as Not Threatened under the New Zealand Threat Classification System.

== Taxonomy ==
R. nigricans was initially described as a variety of the Australian species Rytidosperma semiannularis (as Danthonia semiannularis var. nigricans) in 1913 by Scottish-New Zealand botanist Donald Petrie. In 1963 Russian-New Zealand botanist Victor Zotov elevated it to a full species, under the name Notodanthonia nigricans.

The genus Notodanthonia was synonymised with Rytidosperma in Nicora (1973), after it was recognised that they referred to the same group. The genus Notodanthonia was only described in 1963 by Zotov, whereas Rytidosperma was described in 1854 by Steudel. As such, the older name Rytidosperma took priority under the International Code of Nomenclature. In 1979, New Zealand botanists Henry Connor and Elizabeth Edgar moved the whole Notodanthonia genus to Rytidosperma, following Nicora (1973), and named the species Rytidosperma nigricans.

=== Etymology ===
Rytidosperma: 'wrinkled seed' from the Greek 'rhytidos' = wrinkled and 'sperma' = seed

nigricans: Latin for black. Probably refers to the glumes which are unusually dark purple or black.

== Gallery ==

R. nigricans florets
