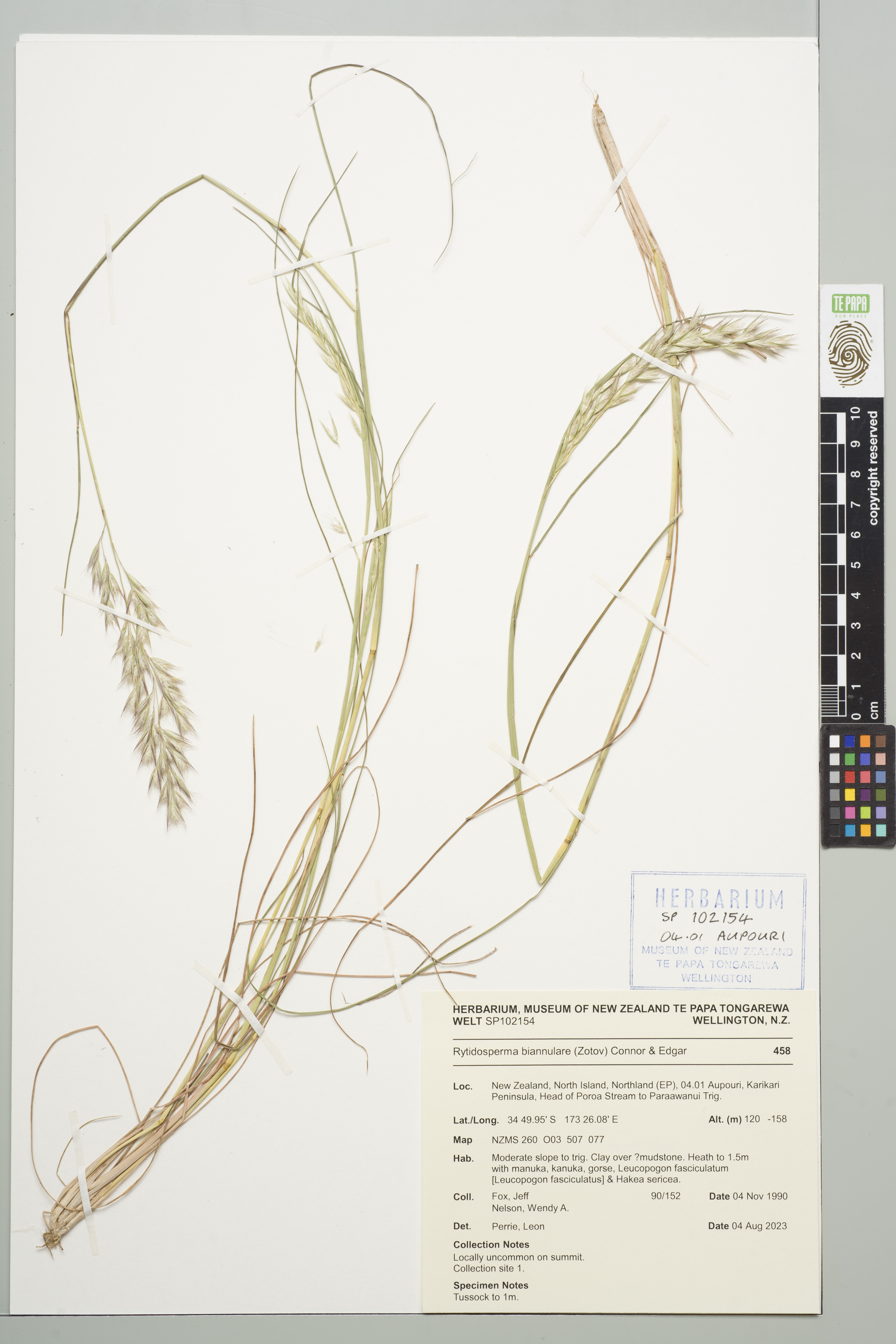
- Te Papa herbarium specimen from Northland, New Zealand

Conservation status
- Not Threatened (NZ TCS)

Scientific classification
- Kingdom: Plantae
- Clade: Tracheophytes
- Clade: Angiosperms
- Clade: Monocots
- Clade: Commelinids
- Order: Poales
- Family: Poaceae
- Genus: Rytidosperma
- Species: R. biannulare

Binomial name
- Rytidosperma biannulare (Zotov) Connor & Edgar

Synonyms
- Notodanthonia biannularis Zotov; Austrodanthonia biannularis (Zotov) H.P.Linder

= Rytidosperma biannulare =

Species of plant

Rytidosperma biannulare, also known as gumland bristle grass, is a species of true grass in the subfamily Danthonioideae. It is endemic to New Zealand and is naturalised in Hawaii and Oregon, and is considered casual in California. It was originally described as Notodanthonia biannularis in 1963 by Russian-New Zealand botanist Victor Zotov.

== Description ==
Leaves are green and narrow, longer than the culms and forming tussocks. Culms hairless and reaching 85 cm tall. Panicle dense and 10-20 cm long, with short branches and few to many spikelets. Spikelets with 6 or 7 flowers and exserted, fine awns.

The ploidy level of R. biannulare was measured to be 4x = 48.

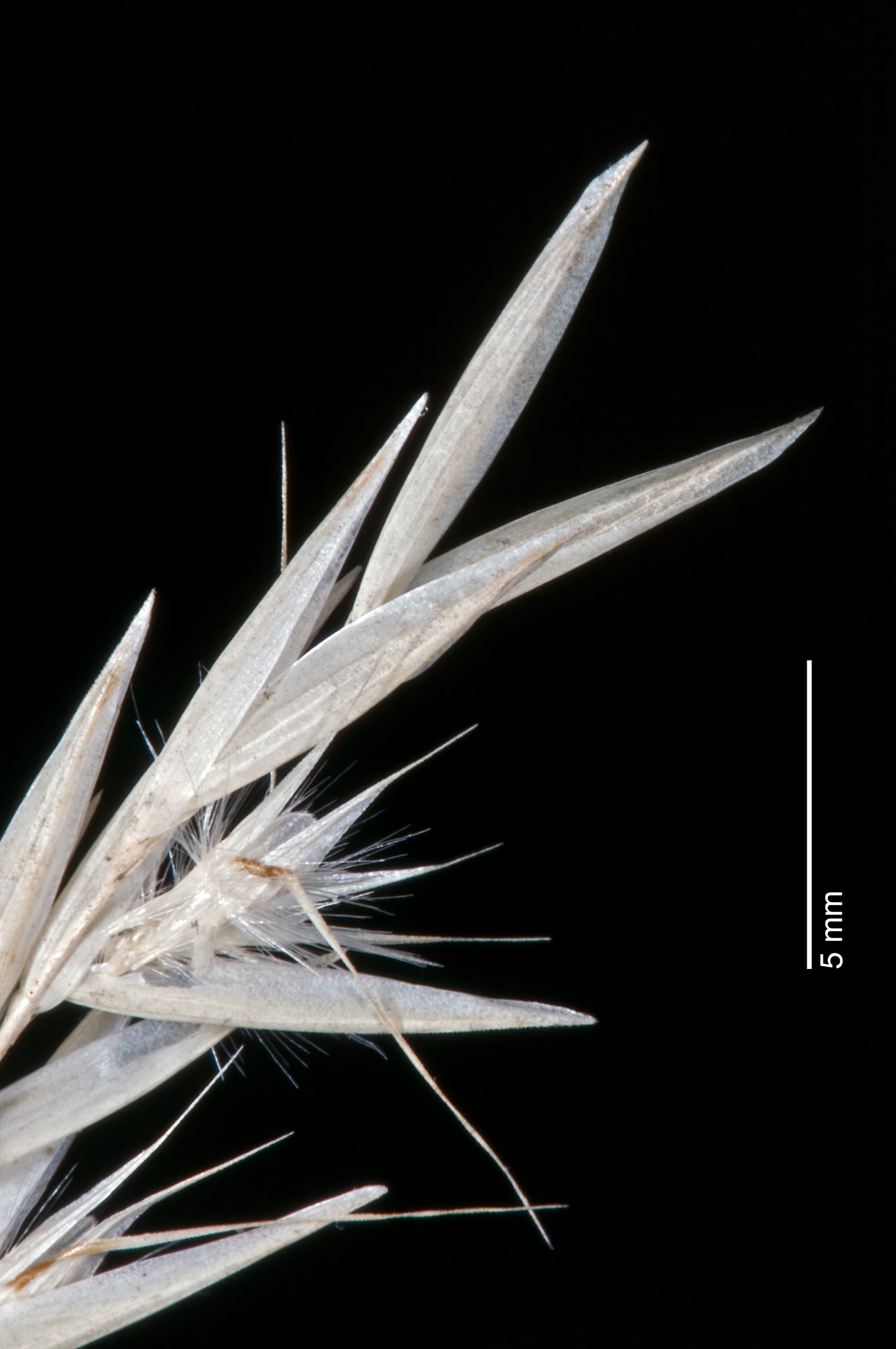
Close-up of floret

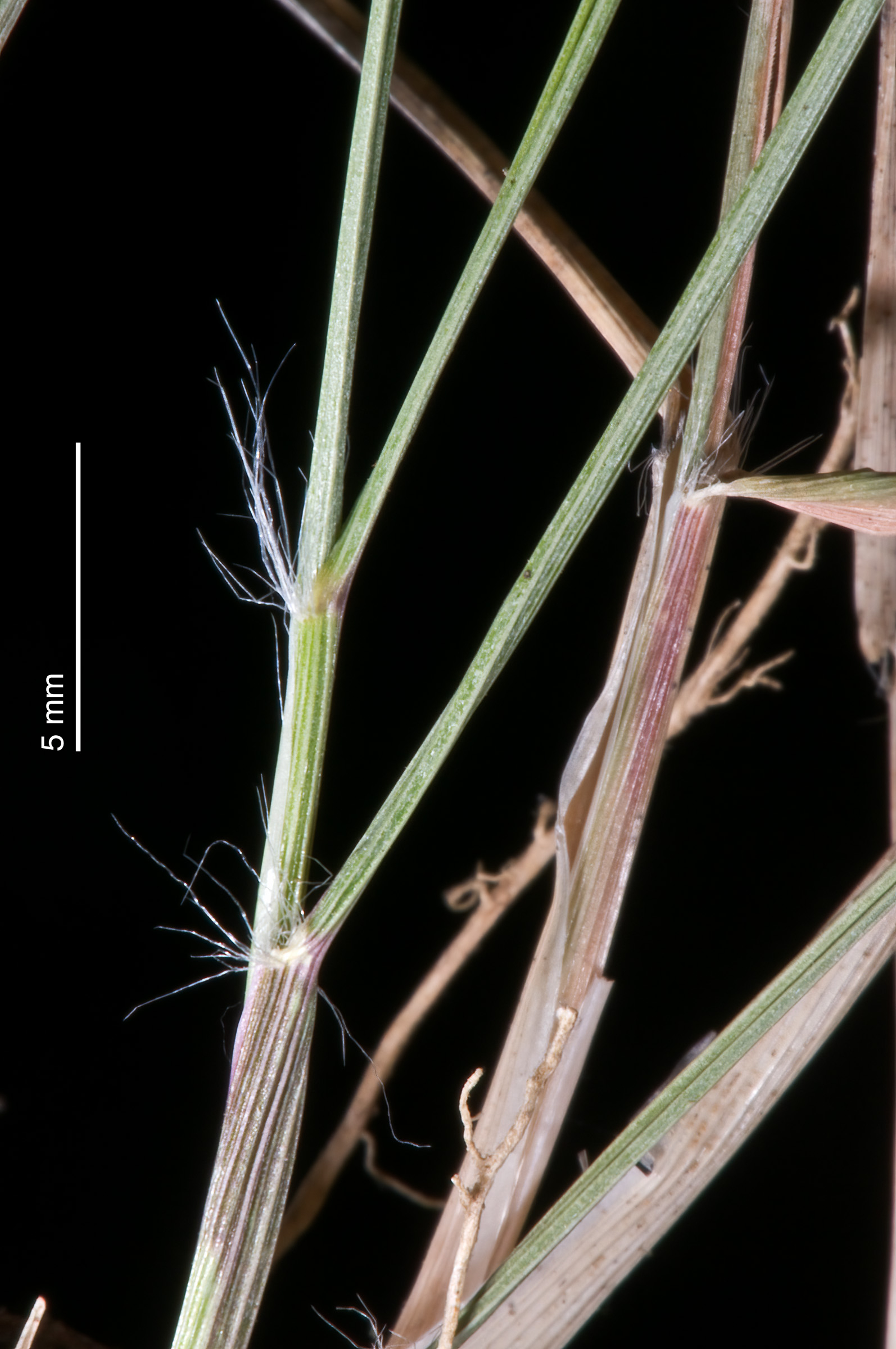
Close-up showing tufts of hairs at apices of leaf sheaths

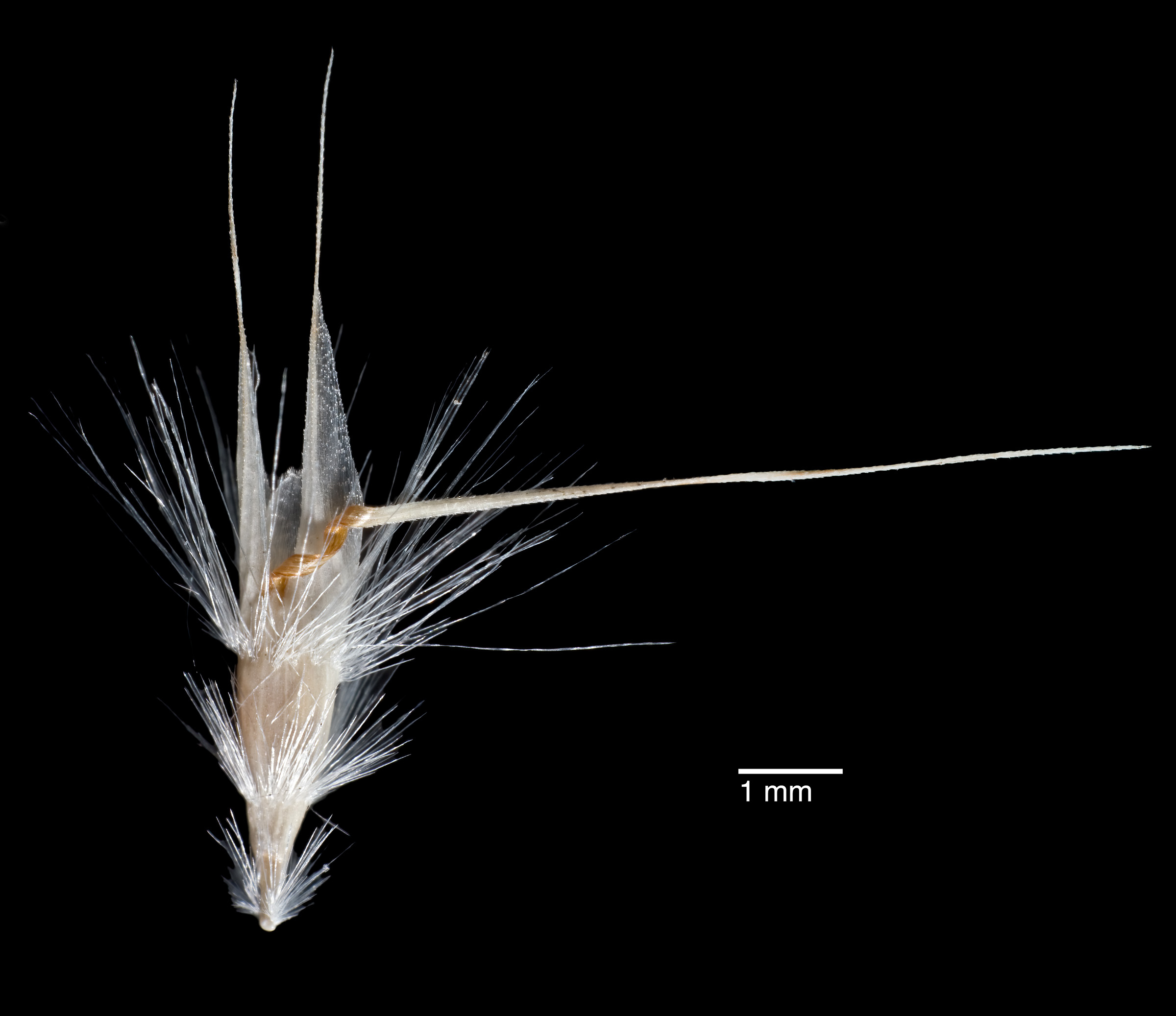
Close-up of floret

=== Identification ===
As a Rytidosperma, the easiest way to identify R. biannulare is to select a single floret (which will contain a single awn, two lateral lobes, and usually three rows of hairs - one on the callus and two on the lemma). The arrangement of the hairs, as well as the relative lengths of the awn, lateral lobes, sometimes the callus can help identify to species, using a key such as that found in the New Zealand Flora.

== Distribution and habitat ==
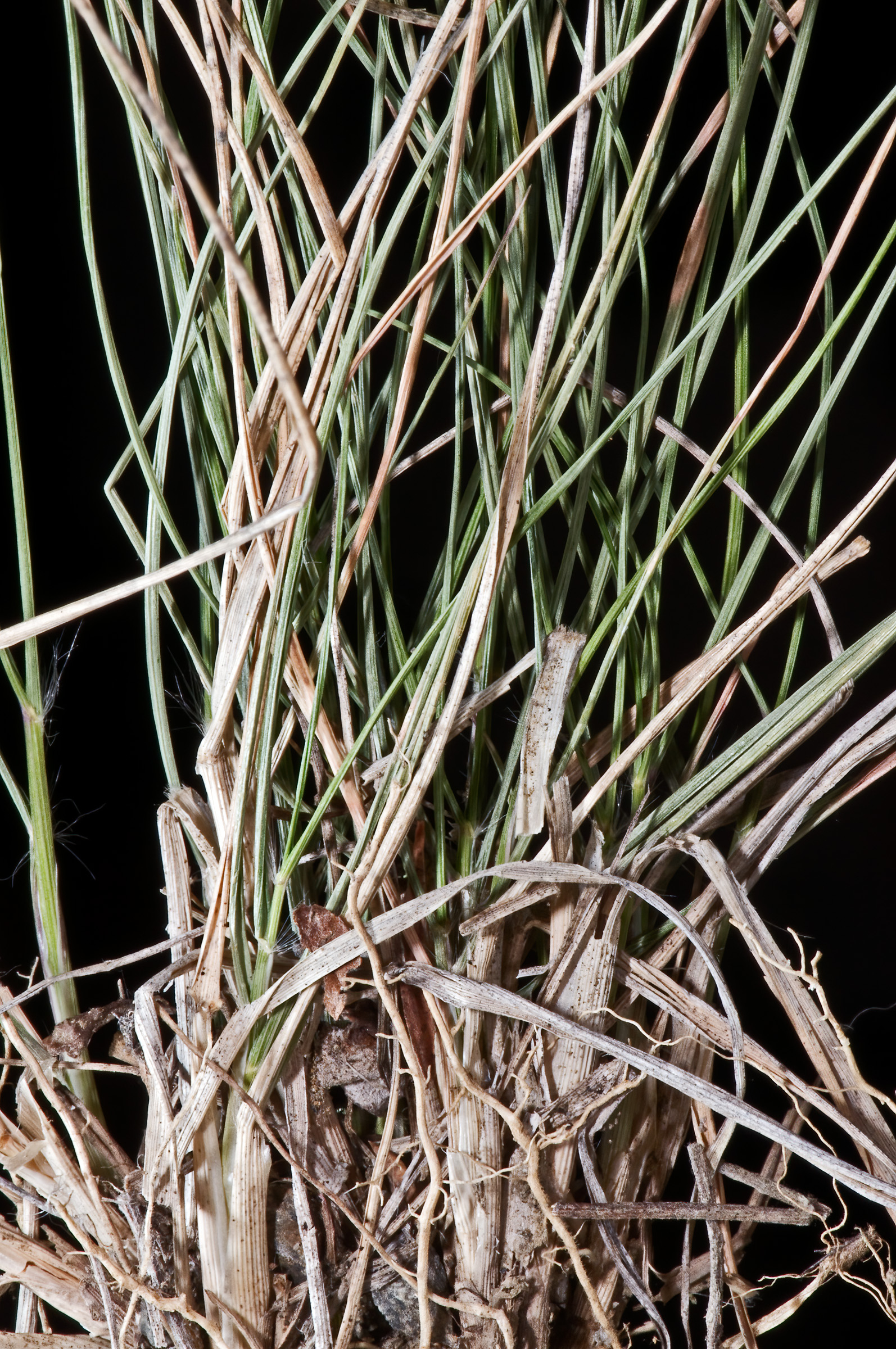
Culms and leaves of R. biannulare

Rytidosperma biannulare is endemic to New Zealand, and found on both the North Island and the South Island. In the North Island, it is mainly found in northern areas from Surville Cliffs (including Northland, Auckland, the Coromandel, and Western Bay of Plenty). South of there, it is very scattered until the Cook Strait area, including Wellington and the northern South Island (Nelson and Marlborough).

=== Naturalised range ===
R. biannulare is also naturalised in Hawaii (on Moloka‘i and Maui) and is currently the only Rytidosperma species known from West Maui, but overlaps with R. gracile is East Maui. It may have arrived within 12 accessions of Rytidosperma imported by the Hawaii Agricultural Experiment Station (HAES) from 1913–1937, or in seeds imported accidentally with hay.

It has also been found casually naturalised in California, where it has been experimentally grown in field trials at Berkeley.

=== Type specimen ===
The holotype specimen was collected in Waitangi Forest, Northland, New Zealand by Zotov in 1953 and is housed at the Allan Herbarium at the New Zealand Institute for Bioeconomy Science in Lincoln, New Zealand (CHR 85021).

== Habitat and ecology ==
R. biannulare is a mainly lowland species found in dry, infertile, and often acidic soils in open areas. In Auckland and Northland, it is often found in gumland systems, which are vegetation communities found in highly leached soils. In these environments, it is often found with other grasses such as Dichelachne crinita, Dichelachne inaequiglumis and Deyeuxia quadriseta. At one site near Cape Reinga, it was found growing beneath mānuka scrub, with Morelotia affinis and Machaerina tenax.

R. biannulare uses C3 carbon fixation.

=== Host ecology ===
The rust fungus Uromyces danthoniae, a species found that grows parasitically on the leaves of several Rytidosperma species in New Zealand and Australia, infects Rytidosperma biannulare. It forms dense clusters of orange-brown aecidia on both surfaces of the leaf.

The smut fungus Ustilago agropyri has also been found growing on Rytidosperma biannulare seeds.

== Threats ==
As at 2023, this species was classified as not threatened by the New Zealand Threat Classification System. It's regionally At Risk in the Waikato and Critical in Wellington.

== Taxonomy ==
Rytidosperma biannulare is a species in the grass family (Poaceae). The species was originally described as Notodanthonia biannularis in 1963 by Russian-New Zealand botanist Victor Zotov.

In 1979, New Zealand grass specialists Henry Connor and Elizabeth Edgar moved all New Zealand species of Notodanthonia to the genus Rytidosperma, which is the correct name for this genus of southern hemisphere grasses in the subfamily Danthonioideae.

=== Etymology ===
Rytidosperma: 'wrinkled seed' from the Greek 'rhytidos' = wrinkled and 'sperma' = seed.

biannulare: meaning 'two rings' in Latin, referring to the two bands of hairs on the lemma.
