= Rytidosperma buchananii =

Conservation status
- Declining (NZ TCS)

Scientific classification
- Kingdom: Plantae
- Clade: Tracheophytes
- Clade: Angiosperms
- Clade: Monocots
- Clade: Commelinids
- Order: Poales
- Family: Poaceae
- Genus: Rytidosperma
- Species: R. buchananii

Binomial name
- Rytidosperma buchananii (Hook.f.) Connor et Edgar

Species of plant

Rytidosperma buchananii also known as black-striped danthonia is a species of true grass in the subfamily Danthonioideae. It is endemic to New Zealand and was described in the Handbook of New Zealand Flora as Danthonia buchanani in 1853 by Joseph Dalton Hooker.

== Description ==
R. buchananii grows in loose, dull green tussocks with intravaginal branching. Panicle inflorescences grow on 50-(70) cm culms, with panicle branches closely short-scabrid and the culm minutely scabrid below the inflorescence. The panicle is erect, to 10 cm, made up of several spikelets. The spikelets contain (3)-4-5-(6) florets, with awns slightly exserted from purplish glumes. The florets contain three obvious rows of hairs, one on the callus, and two on the lemmas. The lemma is 2-3-(3.5) mm, with the upper and lower rows of hairs usually sparse between dense marginal tufts. The upper row is shorter than the lemma lobes, the lower row overlaps the upper. The palea is 3-4 mm, around the same length as the upper lemma hairs. The callus is c. 0.5 mm, with hairs much overlapping the lower lemma hairs.

A single R. buchananii floret

=== Identification ===
As a Rytidosperma, the easiest way to identify R. buchananii is to select a single floret (which will contain a single awn, two lateral lobes, and usually three rows of hairs - one on the callus and two on the lemma). The arrangement of the hairs, as well as the relative lengths of the awn, lateral lobes, sometimes the callus can help identify to species, using a key such as that found in the New Zealand Flora.

=== Similar species ===
R. buchananii is similar to R. thomsonii, in its robust dark coloured spikes. However, R. buchananii has an awn that exceeds the glumes, whereas in R. thomsonii the awn is very short and hardly protrudes past the glumes.

=== Cytology ===
Chromosome counts of both 2n = 36, 2n=48, and 2n = c. 72 have been recorded in R. buchananii.

== Distribution ==
R. buchananii is endemic to New Zealand. In the North Island, it is found in the central mountains and Ruahine range. In the South Island, it is found throughout, largely in mountainous areas, except in Buller and north Westland. It found at sea level in a few places in the North Island, such as in the Rakaunui Scenic Reserve as well as nearby Awaroa Scenic Reserve, both on the Kawhia Harbour, as well as along the east coast of Wellington Region.

Unusually, the cold tolerance of R. buchananii is higher than would be expected from its species distribution. Rather than temperature limiting its distribution, the authors suggest that it could be better explained by competition, time or dispersal limitation. For example, cold tolerance appeared to have emerged in Rytidosperma in the Miocene, around the time that Rytidosperma arrived in New Zealand. Cold tolerance may have provided an adaptive advantage in the context of the Southern Alps building for the first time and been conserved after distributions changed for other reasons.

=== Holotype ===
The holotype was collected in Otago by Hector and Buchanan.

R. buchananii growing on a limestone boulder

== Habitat ==
R. buchananii is normally found in montane and subalpine grasslands, cliffs and rocky sites, but is also sometimes found at rocky sites at lower altitudes.

R. buchananii growing on vehicle tracks

== Ecology ==
In grazed tussock grasslands, R. buchananii is a preferred species by sheep, suggesting that it may be vulnerable to herbivory. However, at some sites, grazing may limit competition, allowing R. buchananii to exist at higher numbers. Indeed, the removal of grazing at some sites has resulted in decline.

The generalist ergot fungus Claviceps purpurea, which grows black masses of fungal spores on the florets of many grasses, is recorded growing on R. buchananii. A similar smut fungus, Ustilago comburens, is found growing on a variety of Rytidosperma species, including R. buchananii.

R. buchananii is also the host of Sphaerodothella danthoniae, a sac fungus that produces black, shiny leaf spots that occasionally coalesce into straight to irregular lines in the leaf surface of Rytidosperma species.

== Threats ==
R. buchananii is classified as At Risk - Declining in the New Zealand threat classification system, however, the population trend is poorly known. In Otago, it is also classified as At Risk - Declining, with an estimated 10-30% decline.

== Taxonomy ==
R. buchananii was described in the Handbook of New Zealand Flora as Danthonia buchananii in 1853 by Joseph Dalton Hooker. In 1864, he moved the species to a varietal rank under Danthonia semiannularis as var. breviseta. The species remained at this rank until Russian-New Zealand botanist Victor Zotov reinstated it as a full species, under the name Notodanthonia buchanani.

The genus Notodanthonia was synonymised with Rytidosperma in Nicora (1973), after it was recognised that they referred to the same group. The genus Notodanthonia was only described in 1963 by Zotov, whereas Rytidosperma was described in 1854 by Steudel. As such, the older name Rytidosperma took priority under the International Code of Nomenclature.

In 1979, New Zealand botanists Henry Connor and Elizabeth Edgar moved the whole Notodanthonia genus to Rytidosperma, following Nicora (1973), and named the species Rytidosperma buchananii.

=== Potential segregates ===
There are several samples of R. buchananii with confirmed chromosome counts of 2n = 36, 2n=48, and 2n = c. 72. This may be evidence of segregates that may warrant recognition as distinct species.

=== Etymology ===
Rytidosperma - wrinkled seed

buchananii: Named after John Buchanan (13 October 1819-1898) who was a New Zealand botanist and scientific artist and fellow of the Linnean Society, and collected the holotype of R. buchananii.
