= Rytidosperma thomsonii =

Scientific classification
- Kingdom: Plantae
- Clade: Tracheophytes
- Clade: Angiosperms
- Clade: Monocots
- Clade: Commelinids
- Order: Poales
- Family: Poaceae
- Genus: Rytidosperma
- Species: R. thomsonii

Binomial name
- Rytidosperma thomsonii (Buchanan) Connor & Edgar

Species of grass

Rytidosperma thomsonii is a species of true grass in the subfamily Danthonioideae. It is endemic to New Zealand and was described as Danthonia thomsonii in 1879 by New Zealand botanist John Buchanan.

== Description ==
=== Identification ===
As a Rytidosperma, the easiest way to identify R. thomsonii is to select a single floret (which will contain a single awn, two lateral lobes, and usually three rows of hairs - one on the callus and two on the lemma). The arrangement of the hairs, as well as the relative lengths of the awn, lateral lobes, sometimes the callus can help identify to species, using a key such as that found in the New Zealand Flora.

== Taxonomy ==
=== Etymology ===
Rytidosperma: 'wrinkled seed' from the Greek 'rhytidos' = wrinkled and 'sperma' = seed
