= Rytidosperma nudum =

Scientific classification
- Kingdom: Plantae
- Clade: Tracheophytes
- Clade: Angiosperms
- Clade: Monocots
- Clade: Commelinids
- Order: Poales
- Family: Poaceae
- Genus: Rytidosperma
- Species: R. nudum

Binomial name
- Rytidosperma nudum (Hook.f.) Connor & Edgar

Species of plant

Rytidosperma nudum is a species of true grass in the subfamily Danthonioideae. It is endemic to New Zealand and was described in the Handbook of New Zealand Flora as Danthonia nuda in 1855 by Joseph Dalton Hooker.
