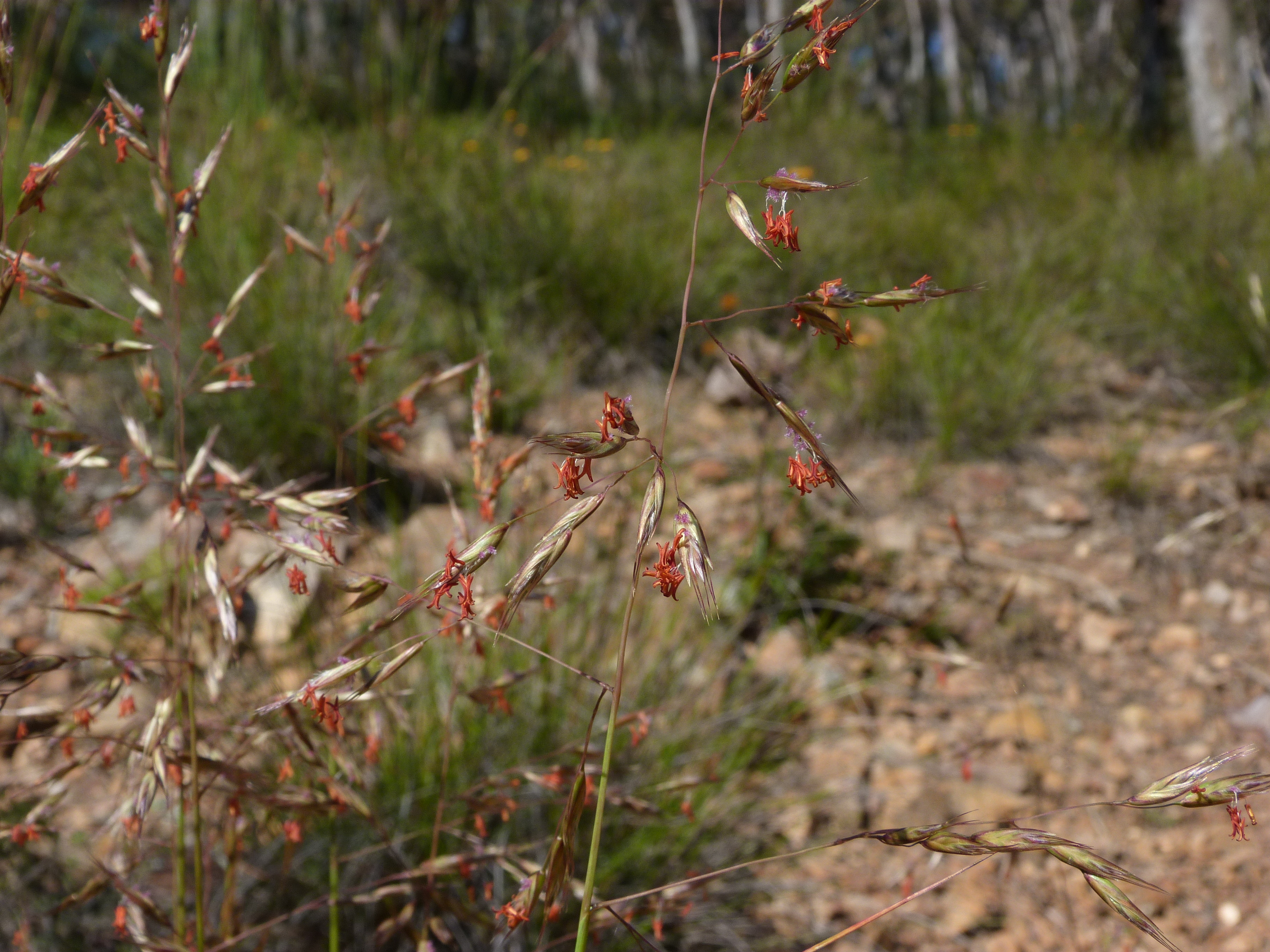

Scientific classification
- Kingdom: Plantae
- Clade: Tracheophytes
- Clade: Angiosperms
- Clade: Monocots
- Clade: Commelinids
- Order: Poales
- Family: Poaceae
- Genus: Rytidosperma
- Species: R. pallidum

Binomial name
- Rytidosperma pallidum (R.Br.) A.M.Humphreys & H.P.Linder

Synonyms
- Danthonia pallida R.Br.; Joycea pallida (R.Br.) H.P.Linder

= Rytidosperma pallidum =

Species of grass

Rytidosperma pallidum (syn. Joycea pallida), commonly known as red-anther wallaby grass, is an Australian species of tussock grass found in Victoria, New South Wales and the Australian Capital Territory. The grass has flowers in December, and the flowers have a prominent red anther, after which it is commonly named.
