= Rytidosperma pilosum =

Scientific classification
- Kingdom: Plantae
- Clade: Tracheophytes
- Clade: Angiosperms
- Clade: Monocots
- Clade: Commelinids
- Order: Poales
- Family: Poaceae
- Genus: Rytidosperma
- Species: R. pilosum

Binomial name
- Rytidosperma pilosum (R.Br.) Connor & Edgar

Species of grass

Rytidosperma pilosum is a species of true grass in the subfamily Danthonioideae. It is indigenous to Australia and naturalised in New Zealand and Hawaii. It was described as Danthonia pilosa in 1850 by Scottish botanist Robert Brown.

== Description ==
=== Identification ===
As a Rytidosperma, the easiest way to identify R. pilosum is to select a single floret (which will contain a single awn, two lateral lobes, and usually three rows of hairs - one on the callus and two on the lemma). The arrangement of the hairs, as well as the relative lengths of the awn, lateral lobes, sometimes the callus can help identify to species, using a key such as that found in the New Zealand Flora.

== Distribution ==
R. pilosum was identified as naturalized on Humu‘ula, Maui Island in Hawaii for the first time in 2025. It had been present there since 1932 but had been confused with other Rytidosperma species. It may have arrived within 12 accessions of Rytidosperma imported by the Hawaii Agricultural Experiment Station (HAES) from 1913–1937, or in seeds imported accidentally with hay.

== Ecology ==
The rust fungus Uromyces danthoniae, a species found that grows parasitically on the leaves of several Rytidosperma species in New Zealand and Australia, infects Rytidosperma pilosum. It forms dense clusters of orange-brown aecidia on both surfaces of the leaf.

It is also a host of Sphaerodothella danthoniae, a sac fungus that produces black, shiny leaf spots that occasionally coalesce into straight to irregular lines in the leaf surface of several species of Rytidosperma.

== Taxonomy ==
=== Etymology ===
Rytidosperma: 'wrinkled seed' from the Greek 'rhytidos' = wrinkled and 'sperma' = seed
