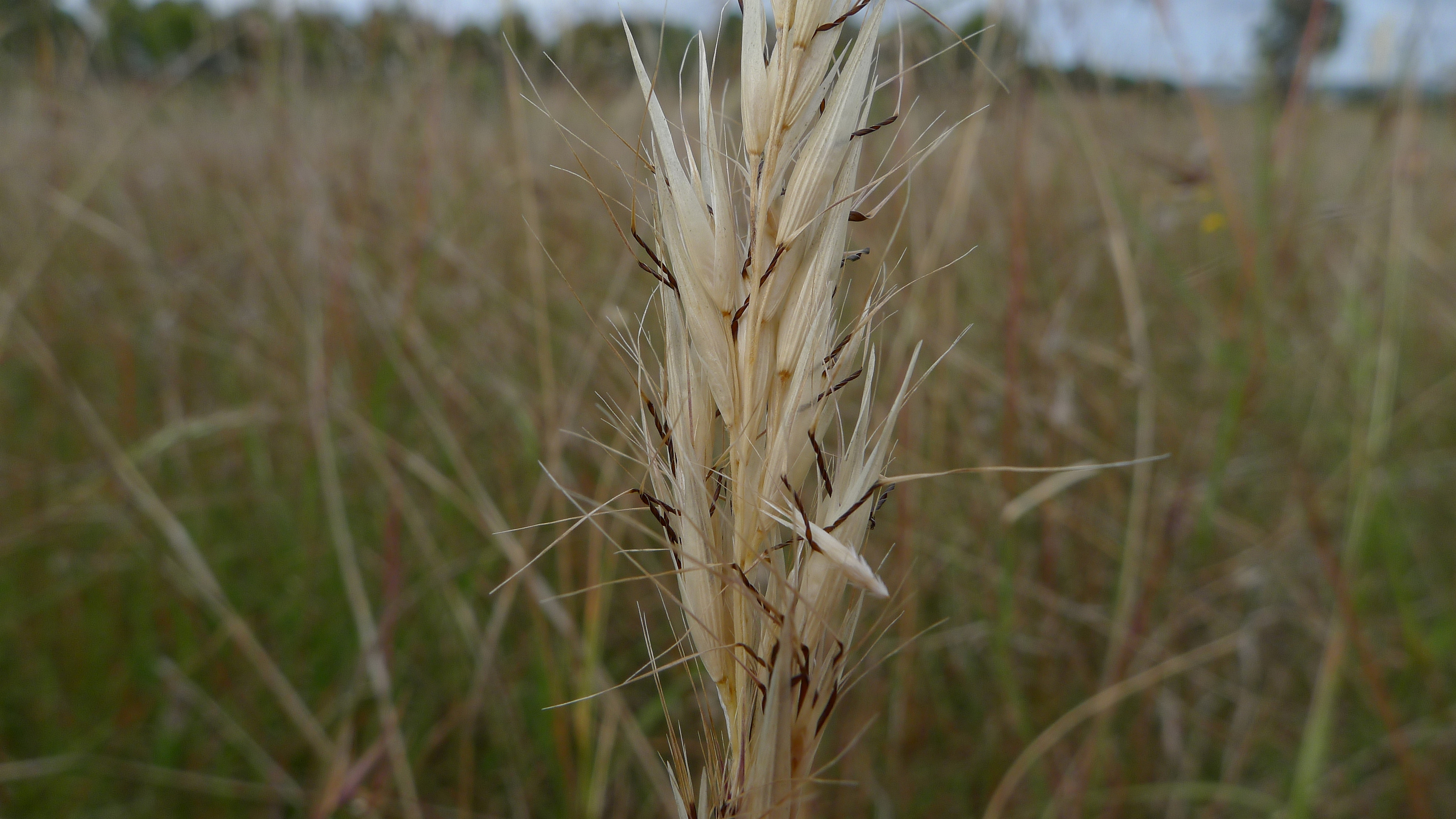
- Rytidosperma pilosum

Scientific classification
- Kingdom: Plantae
- Clade: Tracheophytes
- Clade: Angiosperms
- Clade: Monocots
- Clade: Commelinids
- Order: Poales
- Family: Poaceae
- Subfamily: Danthonioideae
- Tribe: Danthonieae
- Genus: Rytidosperma; Steud.

Type species
- Rytidosperma lechleri Steud.

Synonyms
- Monostachya Merr.; Erythranthera Zotov; Notodanthonia Zotov; Pyrrhanthera Zotov; Joycea H.P.Linder; Thonandia H.P.Linder; Austrodanthonia H.P.Linder

= Rytidosperma =

Genus of grasses

Rytidosperma is a genus of plants in the grass family. Most of the species occur in Australasia, with a few in insular Southeast Asia, southern South America (Chile, Argentina), and certain islands of the Pacific (Hawaii, Easter Island). Several are known by the general common name wallaby grass.

== Species list ==
Accepted species

- Rytidosperma acerosum (Western Australia)
- Rytidosperma alpicola (New South Wales, Victoria)
- Rytidosperma auriculatum - Lobed wallaby-grass (South Australia, New South Wales, Victoria)
- Rytidosperma australe (New South Wales, Victoria, Tasmania)
- Rytidosperma biannulare
- Rytidosperma bipartitum - Leafy wallaby-grass
- Rytidosperma bonthainicum
- Rytidosperma buchananii
- Rytidosperma caespitosum - Common wallaby-grass
- Rytidosperma carphoides - Short wallaby-grass
- Rytidosperma clavatum
- Rytidosperma clelandii
- Rytidosperma corinum
- Rytidosperma craigii
- Rytidosperma dendeniwae
- Rytidosperma diemenicum
- Rytidosperma dimidiatum
- Rytidosperma duttonianum - Brown-back wallaby-grass
- Rytidosperma erianthum - Hill wallaby-grass
- Rytidosperma exiguum
- Rytidosperma fortunae-hibernae
- Rytidosperma fulvum - Copper-awned wallaby-grass
- Rytidosperma geniculatum - Kneed wallaby-grass
- Rytidosperma gracile
- Rytidosperma horrens
- Rytidosperma indutum - Shiny wallaby-grass, yellow-anther wallaby-grass
- Rytidosperma irianense
- Rytidosperma javanicum
- Rytidosperma laeve - Smooth wallaby-grass
- Rytidosperma lechleri
- Rytidosperma lepidopodum - Scaly-foot wallaby-grass
- Rytidosperma longifolium
- Rytidosperma maculatum
- Rytidosperma mamberamense
- Rytidosperma merum
- Rytidosperma monticola - Small-flower wallaby-grass
- Rytidosperma montis-wilhelmi
- Rytidosperma nardifolium
- Rytidosperma nigricans
- Rytidosperma nitens
- Rytidosperma nivicola
- Rytidosperma nudiflorum
- Rytidosperma nudum
- Rytidosperma occidentale
- Rytidosperma oreoboloides
- Rytidosperma oreophilum
- Rytidosperma pallidum - Red-anther wallaby-grass, silvertop wallaby-grass
- Rytidosperma paschale
- Rytidosperma pauciflorum
- Rytidosperma penicillatum - Weeping wallaby-grass, slender wallaby-grass
- Rytidosperma petrosum
- Rytidosperma pictum
- Rytidosperma pilosum - Velvet wallaby-grass
- Rytidosperma popinensis
- Rytidosperma pulchrum
- Rytidosperma pumilum
- Rytidosperma quirihuense
- Rytidosperma racemosum - Slender wallaby-grass, striped wallaby-grass, clustered wallaby-grass
- Rytidosperma remotum
- Rytidosperma richardsonii
- Rytidosperma semiannulare - Wetland wallaby-grass, Tasmanian wallaby-grass
- Rytidosperma setaceum - Bristly wallaby-grass
- Rytidosperma setifolium
- Rytidosperma sorianoi
- Rytidosperma telematicum
- Rytidosperma tenue
- Rytidosperma tenuius - Purplish wallaby-grass
- Rytidosperma thomsonii
- Rytidosperma unarede
- Rytidosperma vestitum
- Rytidosperma vickeryae
- Rytidosperma violaceum
- Rytidosperma virescens
- Rytidosperma viride

Formerly included

- Rytidosperma davyi - Merxmuellera davyi
- Rytidosperma distichum - Tenaxia disticha
- Rytidosperma grandiflorum - Merxmuellera grandiflora
- Rytidosperma subulatum - Tenaxia subulata
