= Victor Zotov =

New Zealand botanist

Victor Dmitrievich Zotov
- Born: 16 September 1908; Vladivostok, Russian Empire
- Died: 26 May 1977 (aged 68); Christchurch, New Zealand
- Relatives: Natalia Zotov (daughter)
- Scientific career
- Fields: Botany; Poaceae
- Institutions: Department of Scientific and Industrial Research
- Author abbrev. (botany): Zotov

Victor Dmitrievich Zotov (16 September 1908 – 26 May 1977) was a New Zealand botanist.

Zotov was born in Vladivostok, Russian Empire and in 1924, together with his parents, immigrated to New Zealand, after the Russian Revolution. He attended Feilding Agricultural High School from 1925 to 1927, where he was taught by H.H.Allan, with whom he went to work in 1928 (having written his first scientific paper) at the Plant Research Station in Palmerston North. In 1936, this became the Plant Research Bureau within the Department of Scientific and Industrial Research, and he continued working in the Botany Division of this organisation until his retirement in 1968.

Zotov's primary research interest was in New Zealand grasses, writing papers on canary grasses, Arundinoideae and especially Gramineae. He was also interested in the vegetation of the Tararua Ranges where he enjoyed tramping, and additionally published on soil erosion. Zotov was one of the botanists on the 1949 New Zealand American Fiordland Expedition.

== Selected publications ==
- (1928) Observations and experiments on the suckling clover content of the pastures on the school farm. Feilding Agricultural College Bulletin 7: 9–11
- Zotov, V.D. (1940). "Certain types of soil erosion and resultant relief features on the higher mountains of New Zealand". New Zealand of Science and Technology. 21B: 256–262.
- Zotov, V.D. (1971). "Simplicia T. Kirk (Gramineae)". New Zealand Journal of Botany. 9 (3): 539–544. Bibcode:1971NZJB....9..539Z. doi:10.1080/0028825X.1971.10430200. ISSN 0028-825X. pdf
- Zotov, V.D. (1971). "Zoysia Willd. (Gramineae) in New Zealand". New Zealand Journal of Botany. 9 (4): 639–644. Bibcode:1971NZJB....9..639Z. doi:10.1080/0028825X.1971.10430226. ISSN 0028-825X. pdf
- Zotov, V.D. (1973). "Hierochloe R. Br. (Gramineae) in New Zealand". New Zealand Journal of Botany. 11 (3): 561–580. Bibcode:1973NZJB...11..561Z. doi:10.1080/0028825X.1973.10430299. ISSN 0028-825X. pdf

== Some published names ==
- Chionochloa flavescens Zotov, New Zealand J. Bot. i. 97 (1963).
- Chionochloa antarctica (Hook.f.) Zotov, New Zealand J. Bot. i. 99 (1963).
- Erythranthera Zotov, New Zealand J. Bot. i. 124 (1963) (accepted name Rytidosperma Steud.)
- Notodanthonia Zotov, New Zealand J. Bot. i. 104 (1963) (accepted name Rytidosperma Steud.)
- Lachnagrostis lyallii (Hook.f.) Zotov, in Rec. Domin. Mus., N. Zeal. v. 142 (1965).
