= Henry Connor (botanist) =

New Zealand botanist

Henry Connor CNZM
- Born: Henry Eamonn Connor; 4 August 1922; Wellington, New Zealand
- Died: 26 July 2016 (aged 93); Christchurch, New Zealand
- Known for: New Zealand poisonous plants, taxonomy and reproductive biology of New Zealand grasses
- Awards: Hutton Medal (2000)
- Scientific career
- Fields: Botany
- Institutions: Department of Scientific and Industrial Research; University of Canterbury

Henry Eamonn Connor CNZM (4 August 1922 – 26 July 2016) was a New Zealand botanist and science administrator. He was an expert on New Zealand poisonous plants and the taxonomy and reproductive biology of New Zealand grasses, and served as the director of the Botany Division of the New Zealand Department of Scientific and Industrial Research.

== Biography ==
Born in Wellington on 4 August 1922, Connor was the son of James Connor and Margaret Edith Connor (née Byrne). He was educated at St Patrick's College, Wellington, and then studied at Victoria University College, graduating Bachelor of Science in 1948 and Master of Science with first-class honours in 1950. In his early scientific career, he catalogued plants that were dangerous to livestock, leading to the publication of the book, The Poisonous Plants in New Zealand, in 1951, and an expanded edition in 1977, which is regarded as the canonical text on the subject. However, his major body of research was concerned with the taxonomy and reproductive biology of New Zealand grasses.

Working at the Department of Scientific and Industrial Research (DSIR) for 40 years, Connor rose to become director of the Botany Division. He was awarded the degree of Doctor of Science by Lincoln College in 1978 on the basis of papers submitted. Following his retirement from the DSIR in 1982, Connor continued working at the University of Canterbury as an honorary fellow. He was elected a Fellow of the Royal Society of New Zealand in 1983.

Connor served on various statutory authorities, including the North Canterbury Nasella Tussock Board, the North Canterbury Catchment Board and the Mount Cook National Park Board.

In 2000, Connor was awarded the Hutton Medal of the Royal Society of New Zealand jointly with Elizabeth Edgar for their contributions to the documentation and botanical classification of New Zealand flora. Together they authored the final volume, volume 5, of the series Flora of New Zealand devoted to grasses, which was published in 2000.

Connor was appointed a Companion of the New Zealand Order of Merit in the 2002 Queen's Birthday and Golden Jubilee Honours for services to botany. He died in Christchurch on 26 July 2016, and his ashes were buried at Waimari Cemetery.

=== Taxonomist ===
The standard author abbreviation Connor is used to indicate this person as the author when citing a botanical name.
