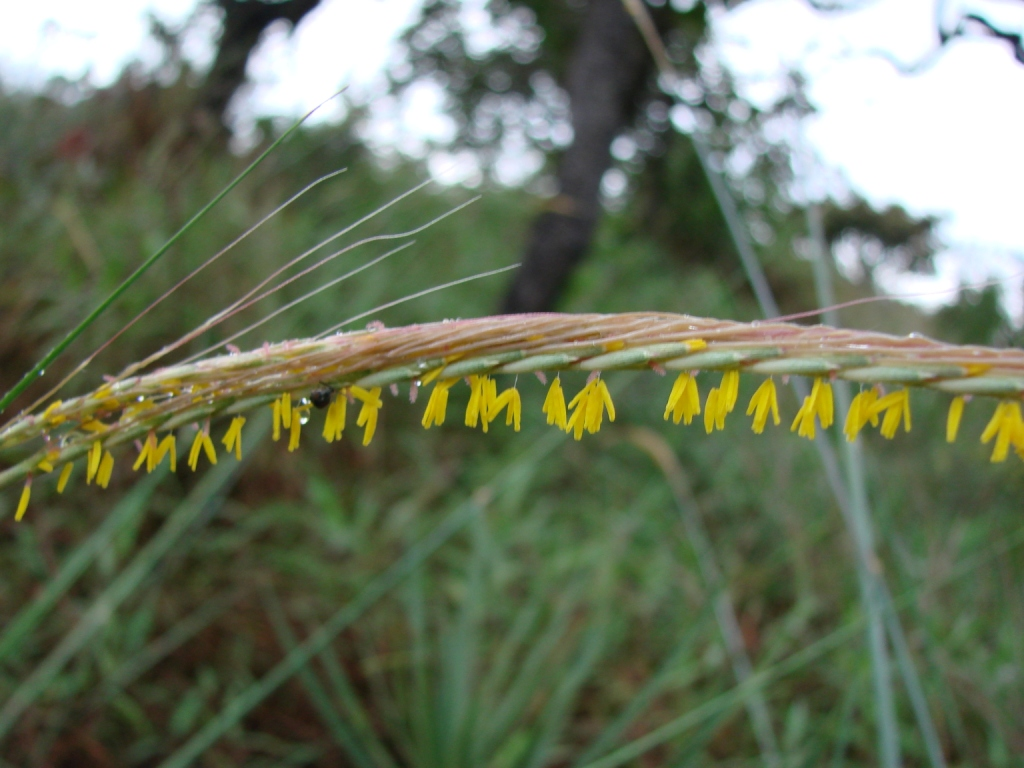
- Trachypogon spicatus inflorescence
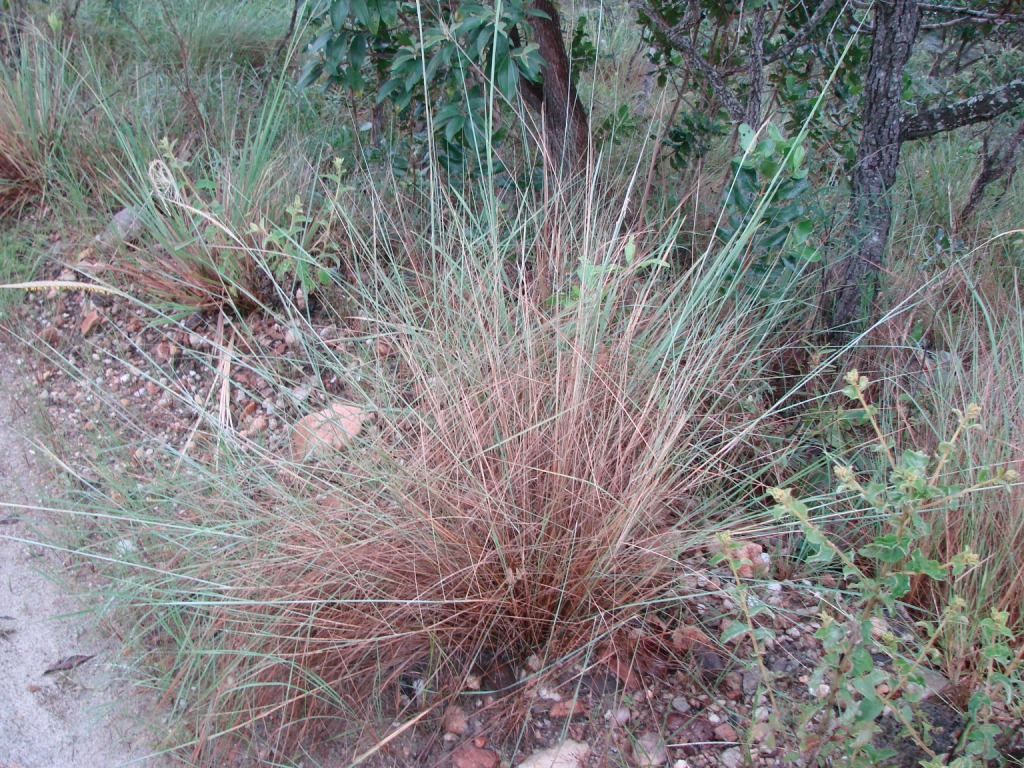
- Trachypogon spicatus habit

Scientific classification
- Kingdom: Plantae
- Clade: Tracheophytes
- Clade: Angiosperms
- Clade: Monocots
- Clade: Commelinids
- Order: Poales
- Family: Poaceae
- Subfamily: Panicoideae
- Supertribe: Andropogonodae
- Tribe: Andropogoneae
- Subtribe: Saccharinae
- Genus: Trachypogon; Nees

Synonyms
- Homopogon Stapf

= Trachypogon =

Genus of grasses

Trachypogon is a small genus of African and Latin American plants in the grass family. Crinkleawn grass is a common name for plants in this genus.

Species

- Trachypogon chevalieri (Stapf) Jacq.-Fél. – western and central Africa
- Trachypogon macroglossus Trin. – Cuba, Puerto Rico, Brazil
- Trachypogon spicatus (L.f.) Kuntze – Africa, Madagascar, South America, Central America, Mexico, West Indies, United States (AZ NM TX FL)
- Trachypogon vestitus Andersson – Central and South America from Honduras to Brazil

formerly included

see Bothriochloa Cymbopogon Heteropogon Hyparrhenia Sorghastrum Sorghum

- Trachypogon argenteus – Bothriochloa saccharoides
- Trachypogon avenaceus – Sorghum halepense
- Trachypogon hirtus – Hyparrhenia hirta
- Trachypogon laguroides – Bothriochloa laguroides
- Trachypogon minarum – Sorghastrum minarum
- Trachypogon pubescens – Hyparrhenia hirta
- Trachypogon rufus – Hyparrhenia rufa
- Trachypogon scaberrimus – Sorghastrum scaberrimus
- Trachypogon schoenanthus – Cymbopogon schoenanthus
- Trachypogon scrobiculatus – Heteropogon melanocarpus
- Trachypogon stipoides – Sorghastrum stipoides
