= Bluestem grass =

Bluestem can refer to various grasses:

- Little bluestem (Schizachyrium scoparium)
- Big bluestem (Andropogon gerardii) and other species of the genus Andropogon
- Species in the genus Dichanthium
- Cane bluestem and Caucasian bluestem of the genus Bothriochloa
