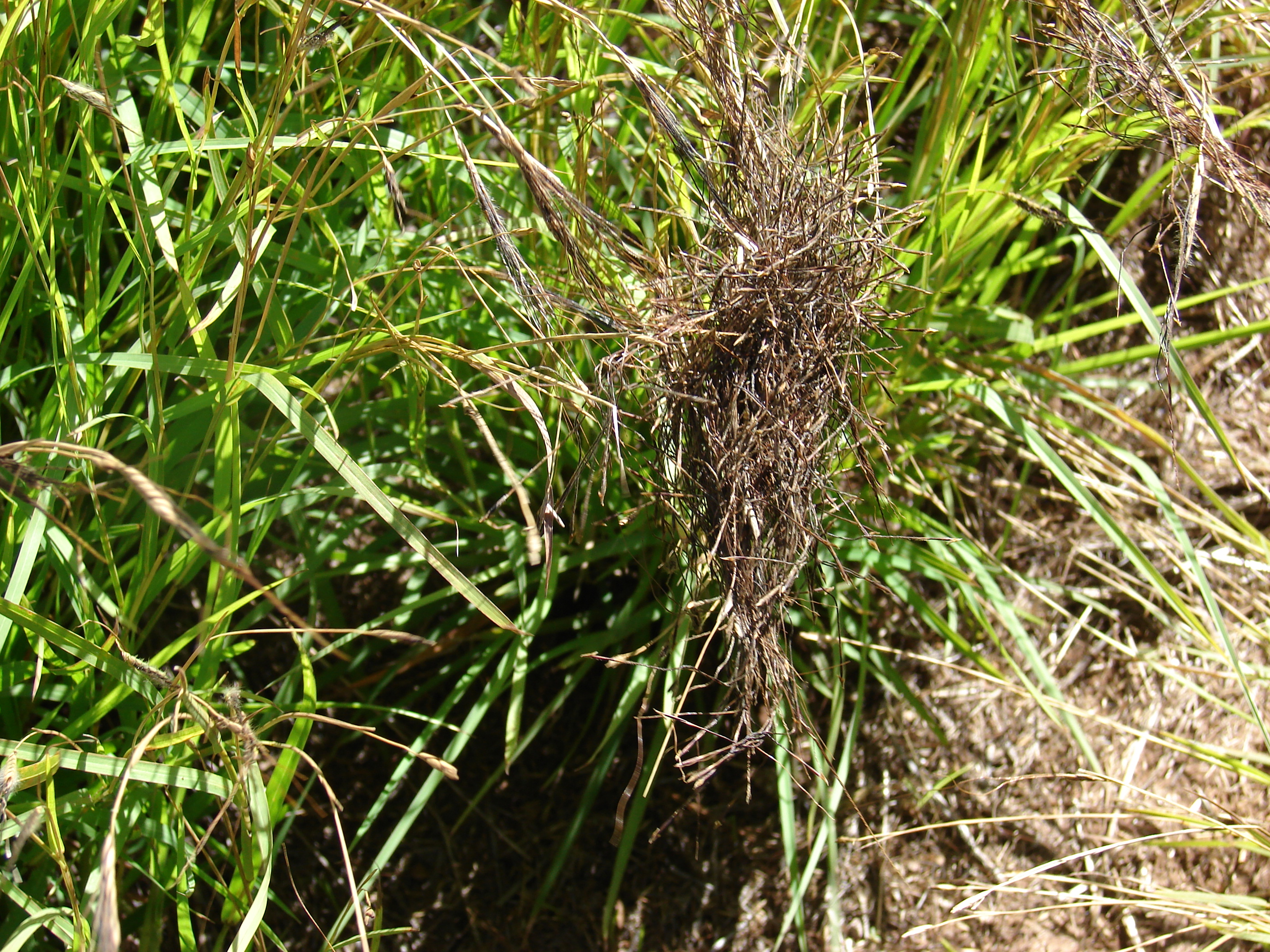
- Heteropogon contortus

Scientific classification
- Kingdom: Plantae
- Clade: Tracheophytes
- Clade: Angiosperms
- Clade: Monocots
- Clade: Commelinids
- Order: Poales
- Family: Poaceae
- Subfamily: Panicoideae
- Subtribe: Anthristiriinae
- Genus: Heteropogon; Pers.

Type species
- Heteropogon glaber (syn of H. contortus) Pers.

Synonyms
- Spirotheros Raf.

= Heteropogon (plant) =

tangleheads

Genus of grasses

Heteropogon is a genus of annual and perennial plants in the grass family known generally as tangleheads, widespread primarily in tropical and subtropical regions.

Tangleheads are erect tussock grasses with paired spikelets. Lower pairs are equal in size (homogamous units), and upper pairs include one awned bisexual spikelet and one awnless sterile spikelet (heterogamous units).

The name of the genus is derived from the Ancient Greek words ἕτερος (héteros), meaning "different," and πώγων (pṓgōn), meaning "beard."

Species

- Heteropogon contortus (L.) P.Beauv. ex Roem. & Schult. - Africa, southern Asia, southwestern Europe (Spain, France, Italy, Switzerland, Balkans), Mesoamerica, West Indies, tropical South America, southern United States (CA AZ NM TX FL HI), Northern Australia, various oceanic islands
- Heteropogon fischerianus Bor - Tamil Nadu
- Heteropogon melanocarpus (Elliott) Benth. - Mesoamerica, West Indies, tropical South America, southern United States (AZ TX AL FL GA NC SC), Africa, Madagascar, Yunnan, India, Oman
- Heteropogon polystachyus (Roxb.) Schult. - Tamil Nadu
- Heteropogon ritchiei (Hook.f.) Blatt. & McCann - India, Myanmar
- Heteropogon triticeus (R.Br.) Stapf ex Craib - Southeast Asia, New Guinea, Queensland, Hainan, India, Sri Lanka

Formerly included

see Agenium Dichanthium Diectomis Diheteropogon Elymandra Hyparrhenia Parahyparrhenia Trachypogon

- Heteropogon androphilus - Elymandra androphila
- Heteropogon arrhenobasis - Hyparrhenia arrhenobasis
- Heteropogon bellariensis - Parahyparrhenia bellariensis
- Heteropogon buchneri - Diheteropogon filifolius
- Heteropogon concinnus - Dichanthium caricosum
- Heteropogon filifolius - Diheteropogon filifolius
- Heteropogon grandiflorus - Diheteropogon filifolius
- Heteropogon hagerupii - Diheteropogon hagerupii
- Heteropogon hirtus - Hyparrhenia hirta
- Heteropogon hochstetteri - Diectomis fastigiata
- Heteropogon leptocladus - Agenium leptocladum
- Heteropogon megapotamicus - Trachypogon spicatus
- Heteropogon oliganthus - Dichanthium oliganthum
- Heteropogon pubescens - Hyparrhenia hirta
- Heteropogon secundus - Trachypogon spicatus
- Heteropogon stipoides - Trachypogon spicatus
- Heteropogon tenellus - Dichanthium caricosum
- Heteropogon tenuiculus - Dichanthium sericeum
- Heteropogon truncatus - Trachypogon spicatus
- Heteropogon villosus - Agenium villosum

== Gallery ==
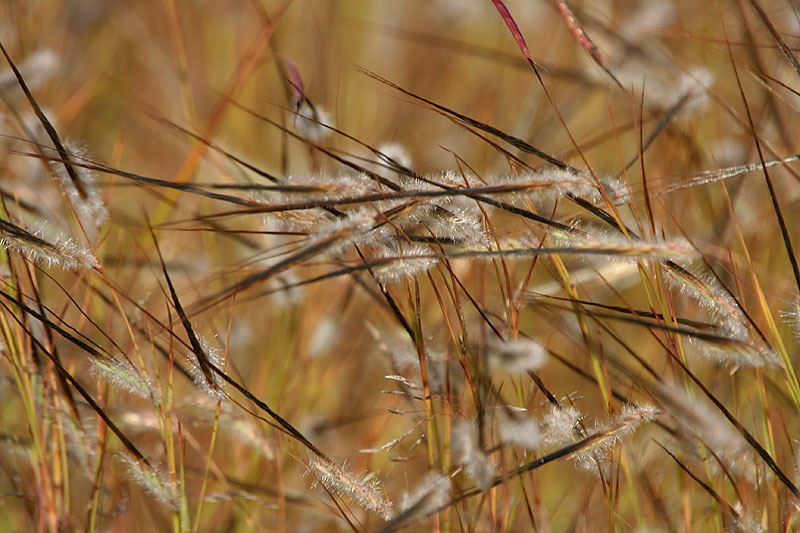
Heteropogon sp.

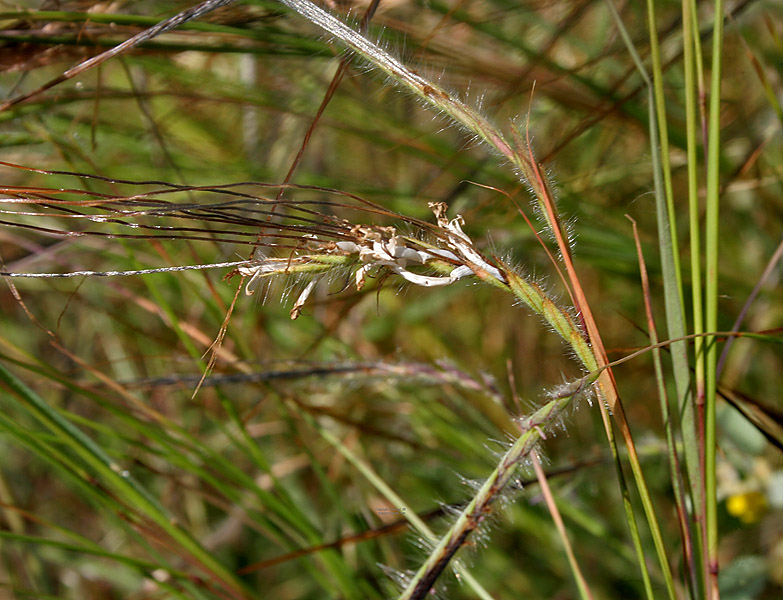
Heteropogon contortus

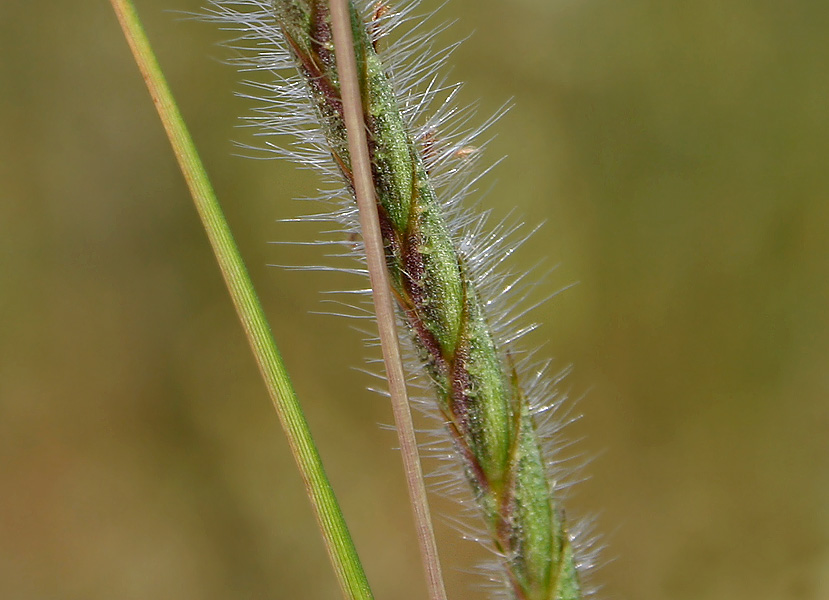
Heteropogon contortus

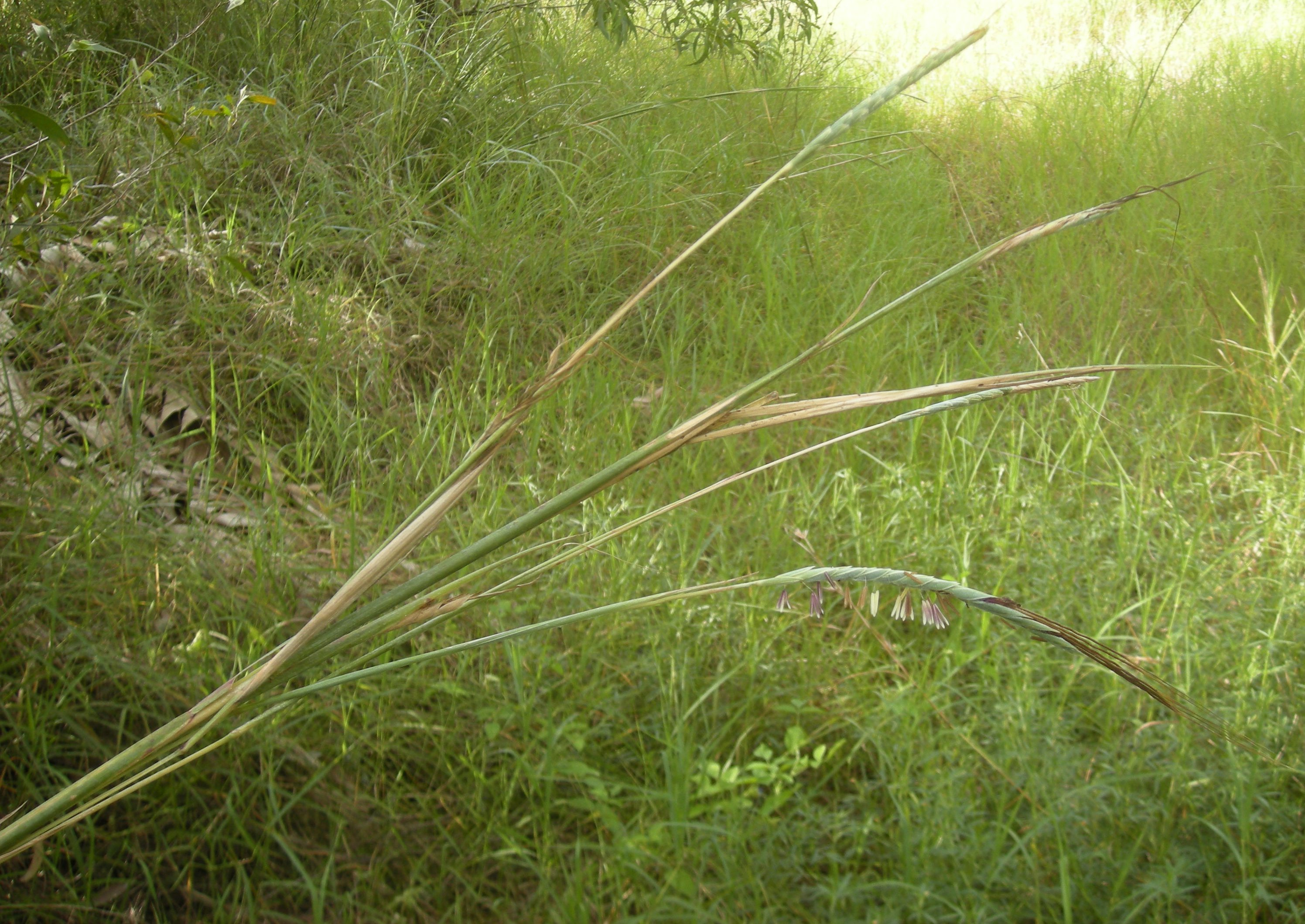
Heteropogon triticeus
