= Rytidosperma auriculatum =

Scientific classification
- Kingdom: Plantae
- Clade: Tracheophytes
- Clade: Angiosperms
- Clade: Monocots
- Clade: Commelinids
- Order: Poales
- Family: Poaceae
- Genus: Rytidosperma
- Species: R. auriculatum

Binomial name
- Rytidosperma auriculatum (J.M.Black) Connor & Edgar

Species of plant

Rytidosperma auriculatum or lobed wallaby-grass is a species of true grass in the subfamily Danthonioideae. It is endemic to Australia and was described as Danthonia auriculata in 1929 by Scottish-Australian botanist John McConnell Black. It is also found in New Zealand, where it is introduced and naturalised.

== Description ==
R. auriculatum is a short, tufted perennial grass. The inflorescence is made up of a few compact spikelets with around 6 florets enclosed by long glumes. Like most Rytidosperma, the florets contain three obvious rows of hairs, one on the callus, and two on the lemmas. The lemmas are 3.5-4 mm long, bearing a long central awn and two lateral awn-tipped lobes. The lateral lemma lobes have a small 'winged' triangular subsidiary lobe, distinguishing them from many other Rytidosperma species. Below the lobes is a long row of hairs, with a second shorter row lower down.

=== Identification ===
As a Rytidosperma, the easiest way to identify R. auriculatum is to select a single floret (which will contain a single awn, two lateral lobes, and usually three rows of hairs - one on the callus and two on the lemma). The arrangement of the hairs, as well as the relative lengths of the awn, lateral lobes, sometimes the callus can help identify to species, using a key such as that found in the New Zealand Flora.

=== Similar species ===
Rytidosperma auriculatum is most similar to R. erianthum. The winged lateral lobes of the lemma distinguish the two species.

== Distribution ==
R. auriculatum is endemic to Australia, and exotic and naturalised in New Zealand.

In Australia, it is found in Victoria, New South Wales, and South Australia, from Dubbo to Adelaide, at an altitude of around 30-620 meters above sea level.

In New Zealand, it is found only in Marlborough, largely around the Wither Hills. It was discovered there in depleted grassland in the Wither Hills conservation area in 1946. It has more recently been discovered at McLean's Island near Christchurch Airport.

The lectotype specimen was collected in Jamestown, Bundaleer Hills by John McConnell Black in 1927.

== Habitat ==
R. auriculatum usually grows on lowland open plains with loamy or clay soil, in natural pastures.

== Ecology ==
Native grasslands in the Southern Tablelands are described as being made up largely by Rytidosperma auriculatum, R. caespitosum, R. carphoides, R. laeve, Themeda triandra, Austrostipa bigeniculata, A. scabra, Bothrichloa macra, Poa labillardieri and P. sieberiana.

Rytidosperma auriculatum and R. carphoides may be foodplants for Synemon spp. sun moths.

R. auriculatum responds positively to kangaroo relative to the comparative exotic grass Avena barbata, being found in much higher concentrations when kangaroo dung is available.

== Biology ==
R. auriculatum flowers between October and November.

It has 2n = 24 chromosomes.

== Taxonomy ==
=== Etymology ===
Rytidosperma: 'wrinkled seed' from the Greek 'rhytidos' = wrinkled and 'sperma' = seed

auriculata: from the Latin auris, meaning ear, -ula (a diminutive suffix) and -ata (a possessive suffix), as in 'possessing small ears'. Refers to the small subsidiary lemma lobes.

R. auriculatum in habitat

== Gallery ==
R. auriculatum in habitat

R. auriculatum inflorescence

R. auriculatum in habitat

Flowering plant

Floret, showing the subsidiary lobe
