= Rytidosperma laeve =

Scientific classification
- Kingdom: Plantae
- Clade: Tracheophytes
- Clade: Angiosperms
- Clade: Monocots
- Clade: Commelinids
- Order: Poales
- Family: Poaceae
- Genus: Rytidosperma
- Species: R. laeve

Binomial name
- Rytidosperma laeve (Vickery) Connor & Edgar

Species of plant

Rytidosperma laeve is a species of true grass in the subfamily Danthonioideae. It is endemic to Australia and introduced and naturalised in New Zealand. It was described in the Contributions to the New South Wales National Herbarium V. 1 as Danthonia laevis in 1950 by Joyce Winifred Vickery.

== Description ==
R. laeve grows in slender, wiry, green tufts, with culms up to 80 cm tipped with a racemose panicle. Panicles contain a few large spikelets on slender pedicels, with long glumes. Spikelets have 5-6 florets, with long awns exceeding the glumes. Like most Rytidosperma, the florets contain three obvious rows of hairs, one on the callus, and two on the lemmas. The upper row of lemma hairs is very dense and continuous and longer than the lemma lobes. The lower row is short. Between the two rows the lemma is shining and hairless (giving it the name laeve). The callus hairs are marginal tufts that barely reach the lower lemma row.

R. laeve floret with naked lemma

=== Identification ===
As a Rytidosperma, the easiest way to identify R. laeve is to select a single floret (which will contain a single awn, two lateral lobes, and usually three rows of hairs - one on the callus and two on the lemma). The arrangement of the hairs, as well as the relative lengths of the awn, lateral lobes, sometimes the callus can help identify to species, using a key such as that found in the New Zealand Flora.

== Distribution ==
R. laeve is endemic to Australia and introduced and naturalised in New Zealand.

=== Native Range (Australia) ===
R. laeve is widespread from the Queensland border to South Australia, as well as in Victoria and Tasmania.

=== Introduced Range (New Zealand) ===
R. laeve naturalised in New Zealand around 1919, and is now found in the North Island in Northland, Auckland City, and the Wairarapa, and in the South Island around Nelson. It has more recently been found near Christchurch.

Pastures and waste places in lowland zone.

== Habitat and ecology ==
R. laeve is ecologically variable, growing in alpine moorland, open grassland or light woodland, often in seasonally damp habitats. It ranges from an elevation of 30–1500 metres above sea level.

R. laeve light woodland habitat

=== Associated species ===
Native grasslands in the Southern Tablelands are described as being made up largely by Rytidosperma laeve, R. caespitosum, R. carphoides, R. auriculatum, Themeda triandra, Austrostipa bigeniculata, A. scabra, Bothrichloa macra, Poa labillardieri and P. sieberiana.

In grazed grassland in the Coolah Tops National Park in New South Wales, R. laeve often grows with other grasses like Microlaena stipoides, Stipa rudis, and Echinopogon ovatus, as well as the forbs Acaena novae-zelandiae, Euchiton collinus, and the sedge Lomandra filiformis.

=== Life cycle ===
In Australia, R. laeve flowers from October to January.

== Taxonomy ==
The species was first described in 1829 as Danthonia laevis in 1950 by Joyce Winifred Vickery, from a specimen collected at the base of Mount Stromlo, in the Capital Territory. In 1963 it was moved to the new genus Notodanthonia by Russian-New Zealand botanist Victor Zotov, who recognised that Southern Hemisphere species that had been placed in Danthonia were distinct from those in the Northern Hemisphere.

The genus Notodanthonia was synonymised with Rytidosperma in Nicora (1973), after it was recognised that they referred to the same group. The genus Notodanthonia was only described in 1963 by Zotov, whereas Rytidosperma was described in 1854 by Steudel. As such, the older name Rytidosperma took priority under the International Code of Nomenclature. In 1979, New Zealand botanists Henry Connor and Elizabeth Edgar moved the whole Notodanthonia genus to Rytidosperma, following Nicora (1973), and named the species Rytidosperma laeve.

In 1993 it was transferred into Austrodanthonia by Hans Peter Linder. However, in 2010 Austrodanthonia was again submerged into a broader Rytidosperma, and all Austrodanthonia species are now again considered part of the genus Rytidosperma.

=== Possible hybrids ===
Intermediate plants exist between R. laeve and R. caespitosum, suggesting that they may hybridise.

=== Etymology ===
Rytidosperma: 'wrinkled seed' from the Greek 'rhytidos' = wrinkled and 'sperma' = seed

laevis: Latin for smooth. Referring to the lack of hairs on most of the lemma.

R. laeve panicle

R. laeve floret with naked lemma
