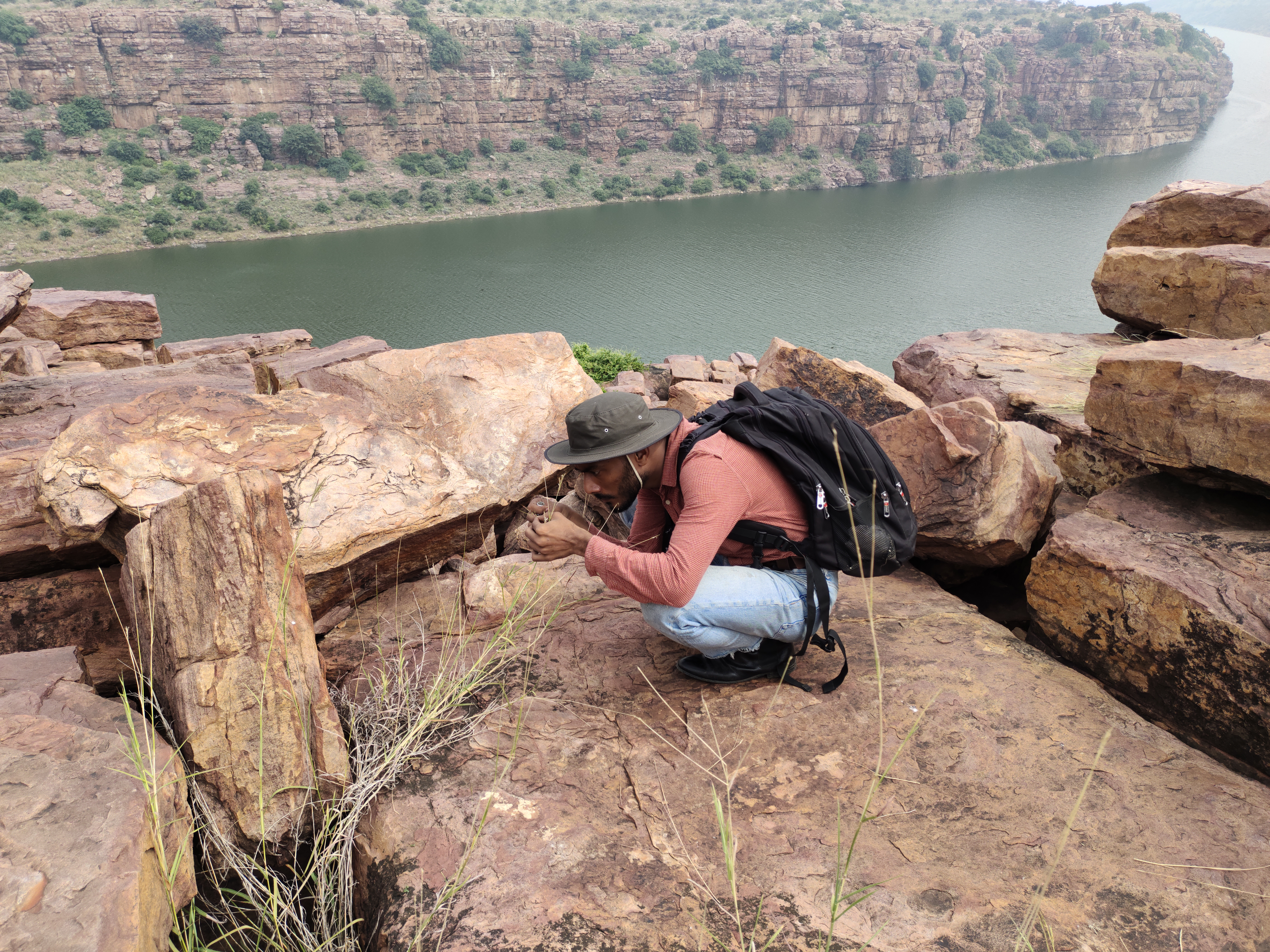
- Shahid Nawaz studying Bothriochloa pseudoischaemum in South India.

Scientific classification
- Kingdom: Plantae
- Clade: Tracheophytes
- Clade: Angiosperms
- Clade: Monocots
- Clade: Commelinids
- Order: Poales
- Family: Poaceae
- Subfamily: Panicoideae
- Supertribe: Andropogonodae
- Tribe: Andropogoneae
- Subtribe: Andropogoninae
- Genus: Bothriochloa; Kuntze

Type species
- Bothriochloa anamitica (syn of B. bladhii) Kuntze

Synonyms
- Amphilophis Nash; Dichanthium sect. Bothriochloa (Kuntze) Roberty

= Bothriochloa =

Genus of plants

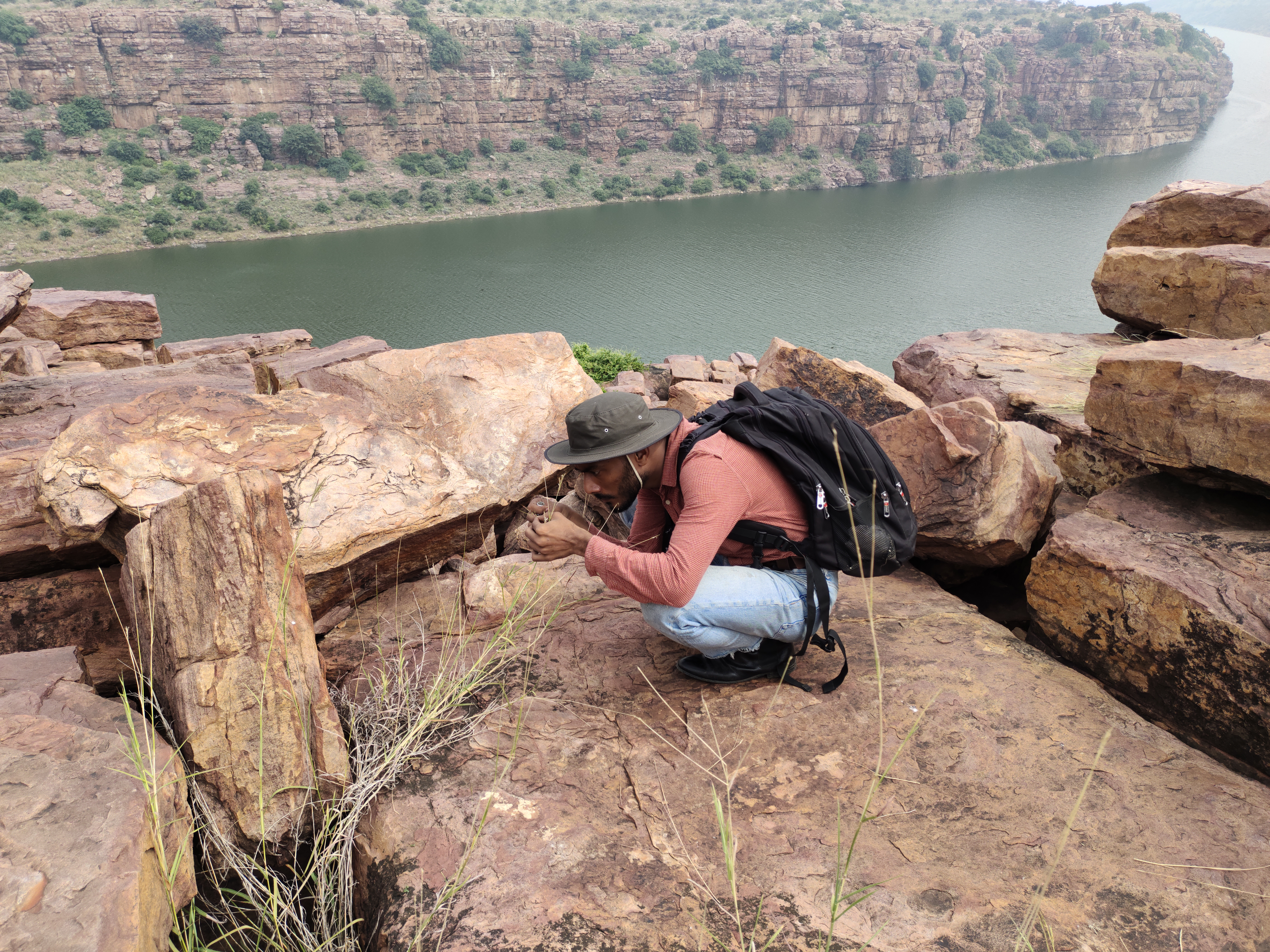
Shahid Nawaz studying Bothriochloa pseudoischaemum (Nees ex Steud.) Henrard in South India.

Bothriochloa is a common and widespread genus of plants in the grass family native to many countries on all inhabited continents and many islands. They are often called beardgrass, bluegrass or bluestem. Some species are invasive in areas where they have been introduced.

The etymology of the genus name Bothriochloa derives from the two ancient Greek words βοθρίον (bothríon), meaning "small pit or trench", and χλόη or χλόα (khlóa), meaning "new green shoot or blade of grass".

Recently, some specimens of Bothriochloa were collected from Gooty Fort Hill, Andhra Pradesh, India and identified as Bothriochloa ewartiana (Domin) C. E. Hubb. based on literature study and international correspondence with experts from Australia, Indonesia and Americas. It formed an extended and disjunct distribution of a Far Eastern species in Asia from India.

== Systematics ==
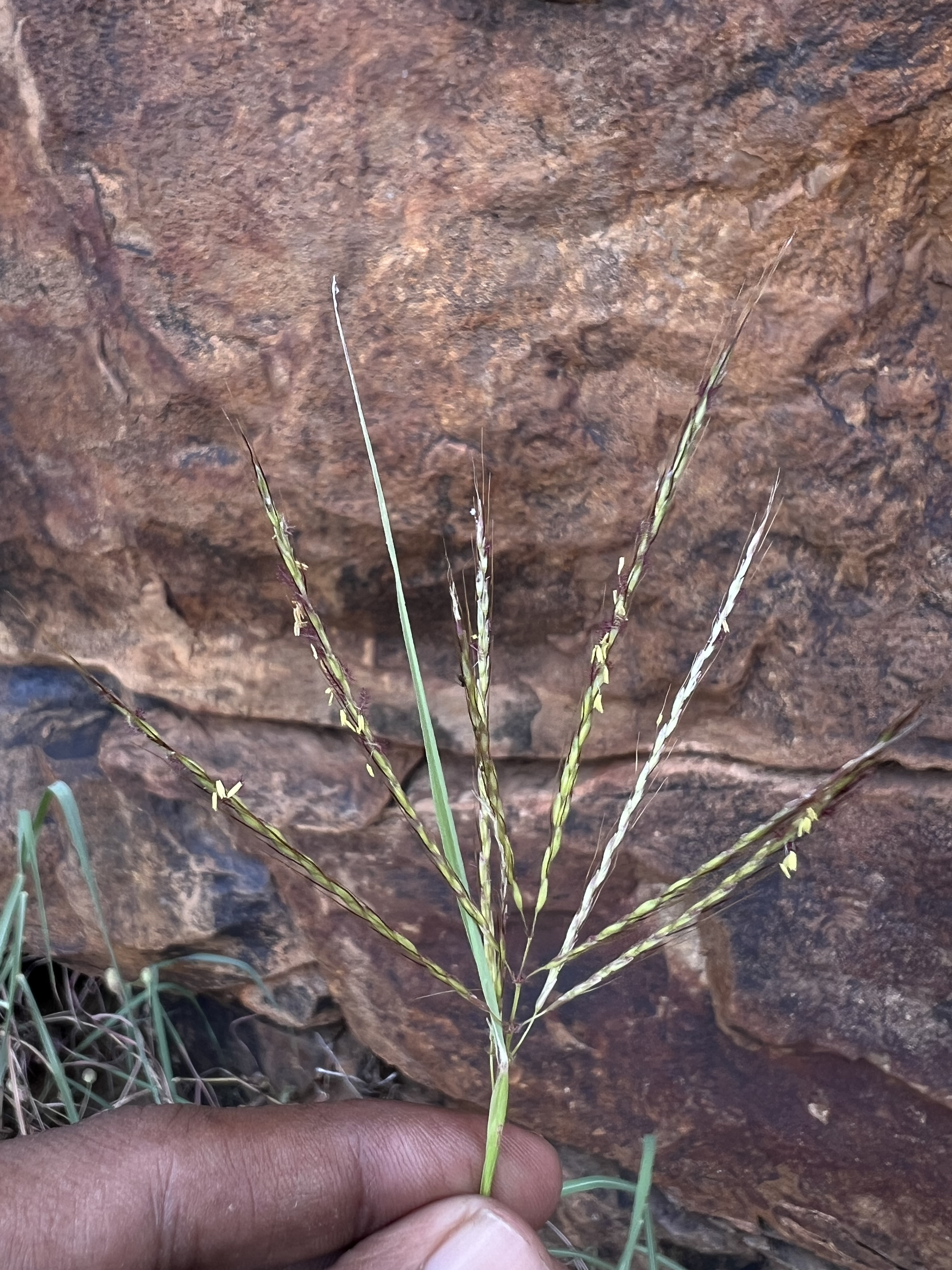
Inflorescence of Bothriochloa pseudoischaemum (Nees ex Steud.) Henrard.

=== Species list ===
The following species are recognised:

- Bothriochloa alta (Hitchc.) Henrard – tall beardgrass – Americas from New Mexico to Argentina
- Bothriochloa barbinodis (Lag.) Herter– cane bluestem – USA (CO MO OK AZ CA NV UT TX NM FL SC), Mexico, El Salvador, South America (from Colombia to Paraguay)
- Bothriochloa biloba S.T.Blake – Queensland, New South Wales
- Bothriochloa bladhii (Retz.) S.T.Blake – Asia (Yemen to Caucasus to Japan to Maluku), Australia, New Guinea, Africa, Madagascar
- Bothriochloa bunyensis B.K.Simon – Queensland
- Bothriochloa campii (Swallen) De Wet – Ecuador
- Bothriochloa compressa (Hook.f.) Henrard – India, Lesser Sunda Islands
- Bothriochloa decipiens (Hack.) C.E.Hubb. – Australia
- Bothriochloa edwardsiana (Gould) Parodi – Mexico, Texas, Argentina, Uruguay
- Bothriochloa ensiformis (Hook.f.) Henrard – India
- Bothriochloa erianthoides (F.Muell.) C.E.Hubb. – Queensland, New South Wales
- Bothriochloa eurylemma M.Marchi & Longhi – Wagner – Brazil (Mato Grosso do Sul), Argentina (Entre Ríos, Chaco, Formosa, Tucumán, Salta)
- Bothriochloa ewartiana (Domin) C.E.Hubb. – Australia, Philippines, Lesser Sunda Islands, Andhra Pradesh, India
- Bothriochloa exaristata (Nash) Henrard – awnless beardgrass – southern Brazil, northern Argentina, Paraguay, Bolivia, Peru, USA (TX LA)
- Bothriochloa grahamii (Haines) Bor – India
- Bothriochloa hirtifolia (J.Presl) Henrard – Mexico, Guatemala
- Bothriochloa hybrida (Gould) Gould – USA (TX LA), Mexico (from Chihuahua to Oaxaca)
- Bothriochloa imperatoides (Lillo) Herter – Rio Grande do Sul, northern Argentina, Uruguay
- Bothriochloa insculpta (Hochst. ex A.Rich.) A.Camus – sweetpitted grass – Africa, Madagascar, India, Arabian Peninsula, Spain, Sicily
- Bothriochloa ischaemum (L.) Keng – yellow bluestem – Eurasia + North Africa from Portugal + Canary Islands to Korea
- Bothriochloa kuntzeana (Hack.) Henrard – India, Nepal
- Bothriochloa laguroides (DC.) Herter – silver bluestem – Americas from Mexico to Chile
- Bothriochloa longifolia (Hack.) Bor – India
- Bothriochloa longipaniculata (Gould) Allred & Gould – longspike beardgrass – Brazil (Mato Grosso do Sul, Rio de Janeiro, Rio Grande do Sul, Santa Catarina), Argentina (Corrientes, Chaco, Formosa, Misiones), Paraguay, Guatemala, Mexico, USA (TX LA MS)
- Bothriochloa macra (Steud.) S.T.Blake – red – leg grass, red grass, redleg or pitted beard grass – Australia
- Bothriochloa meridionalis M.Marchi & Longhi – Wagner – Venezuela, Colombia, Ecuador, Rio Grande do Sul
- Bothriochloa modesta (Backer) Backer & Henrard – Java, Lesser Sunda Islands
- Bothriochloa pertusa (L.) A.Camus – pitted beardgrass – China, India, Southeast Asia, Australia, islands of Indian Ocean + western Pacific
- Bothriochloa pseudischaemum (Nees ex Steud.) Henrard – India, Sri Lanka
- Bothriochloa radicans (Lehm.) A.Camus – eastern + southern Africa, Arabian Peninsula
- Bothriochloa saccharoides Rydb. – Americas from Utah to Uruguay
- Bothriochloa springfieldii (Gould) Parodi – USA (CO AZ UT TX NM LA), Mexico, Bolivia, Argentina
- Bothriochloa torreyana (Steud.) Scrivanti & Anton – southern USA (from CA to SC), Mexico, Central America, Brazil, Argentina, Uruguay
- Bothriochloa velutina M.Marchi & Longhi – Wagner – Paraná, Santa Catarina
- Bothriochloa woodrovii (Hook.f.) A.Camus – India
- Bothriochloa wrightii (Hack.) Henrard – Mexico, USA (TX NM AZ)

=== Former taxa ===
See Capillipedium, Dichanthium, Euclasta, Hemisorghum and Pseudosorghum.

The following taxa were formerly included in the genus:

- Bothriochloa assimilis – Capillipedium assimile
- Bothriochloa concanensis – Dichanthium concanense
- Bothriochloa foulkesii – Dichanthium foulkesii
- Bothriochloa gracilis – Pseudosorghum fasciculare
- Bothriochloa kwashotensis – Capillipedium kwashotense
- Bothriochloa parviflora – Capillipedium parviflorum
- Bothriochloa picta – Capillipedium assimile
- Bothriochloa piptanthera – Euclasta condylotricha
- Bothriochloa spicigera – Capillipedium spicigerum
- Bothriochloa tuberculata – Dichanthium annulatum
- Bothriochloa venusta – Hemisorghum venustum
- Bothriochloa yunnanensis – Pseudosorghum fasciculare

== See also ==
- List of Poaceae genera
