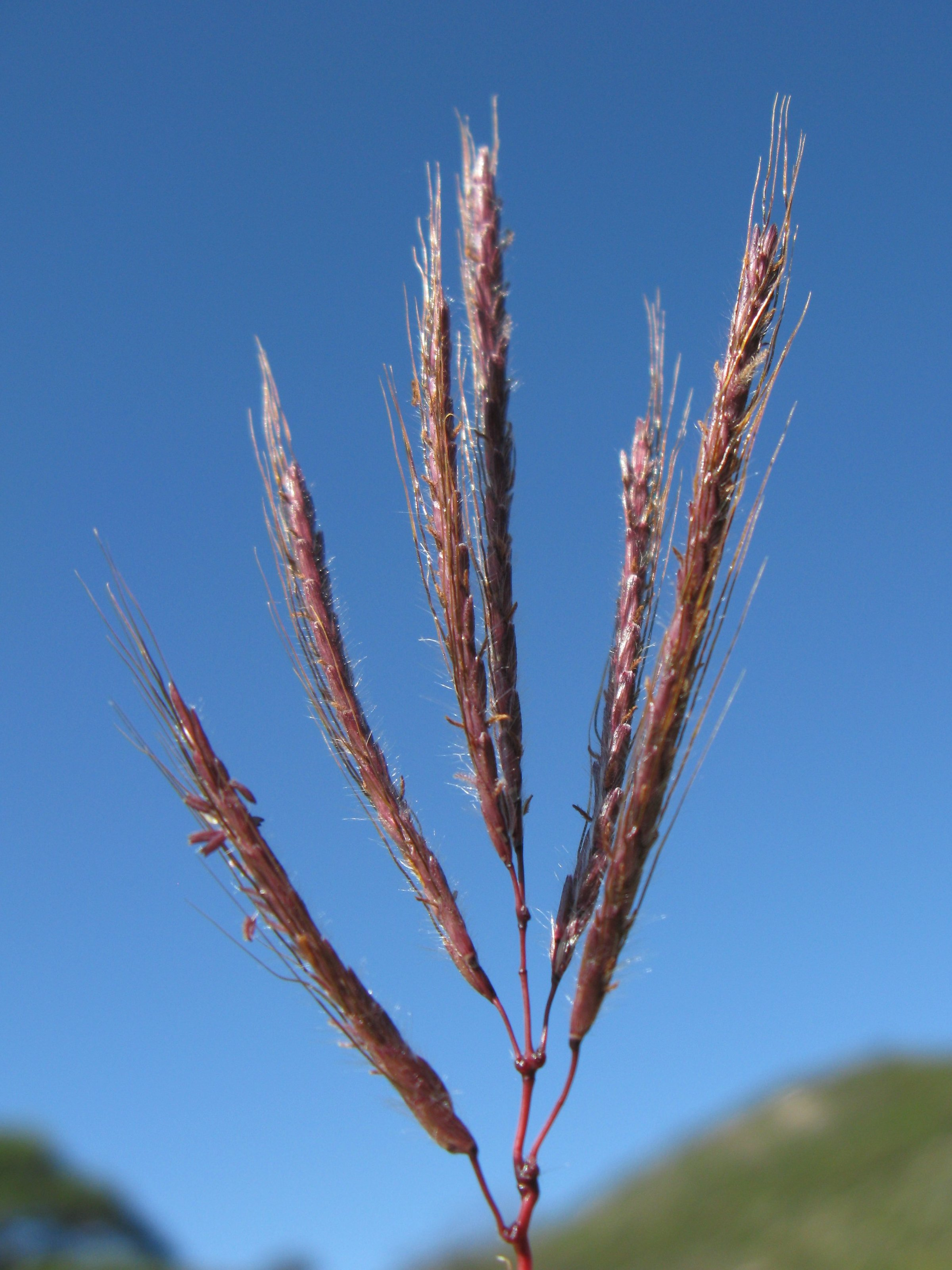

Scientific classification
- Kingdom: Plantae
- Clade: Embryophytes
- Clade: Tracheophytes
- Clade: Angiosperms
- Clade: Monocots
- Clade: Commelinids
- Order: Poales
- Family: Poaceae
- Subfamily: Panicoideae
- Genus: Dichanthium
- Species: D. annulatum

Binomial name
- Dichanthium annulatum (Forssk.) Stapf

Synonyms
- Andropogon annulatus Andropogon papillosus Dichanthium nodosum Dichanthium papillosum

= Dichanthium annulatum =

Species of plant

Dichanthium annulatum is a species of grass in the family Poaceae. It is commonly used as a forage for livestock.

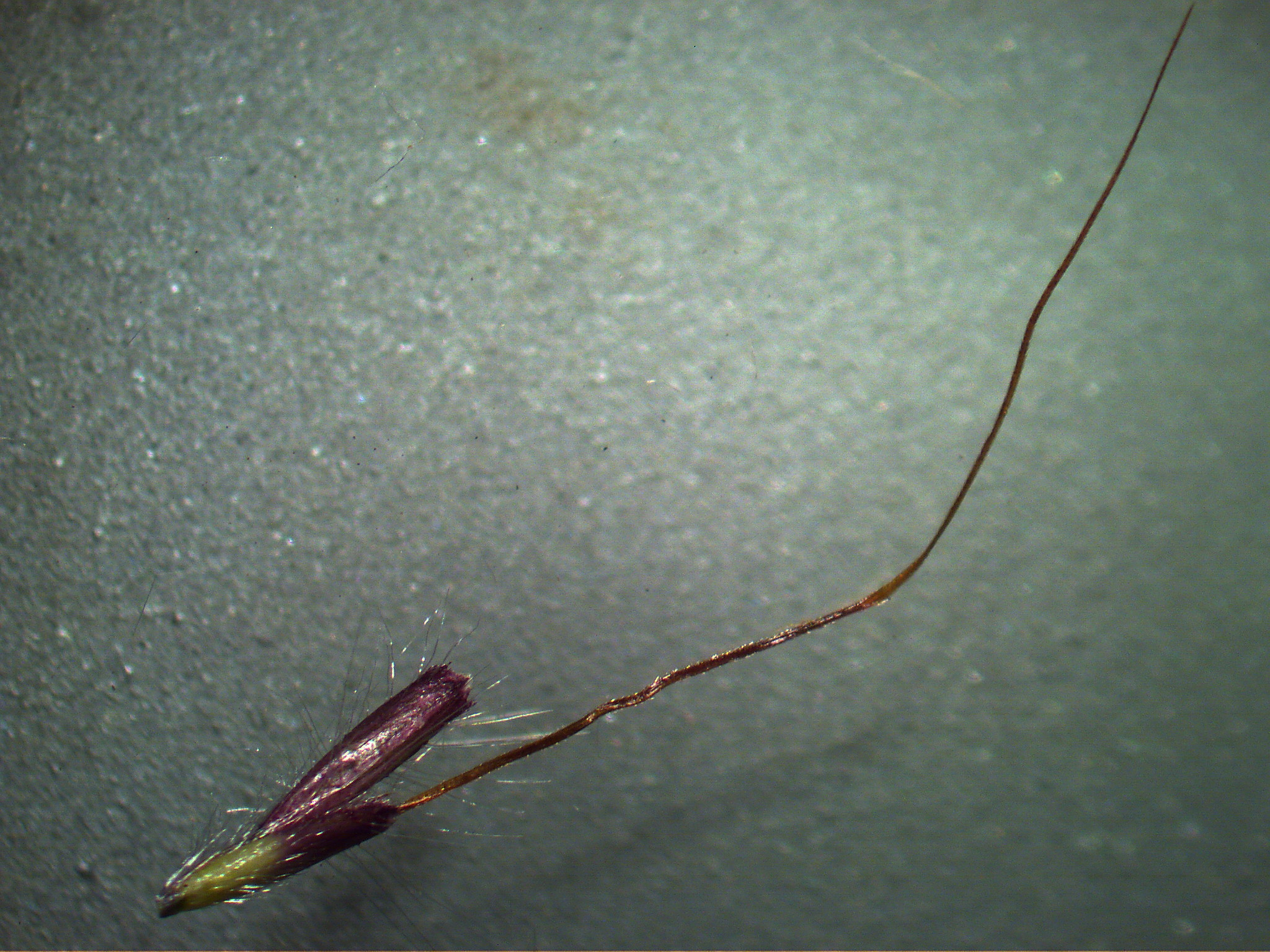
Spikelet with long awn

Common names include marvel grass, Diaz bluestem, Kleberg bluestem, Hindi grass, ringed dichanthium, sheda grass, medio bluestem (var. papillosum), jargu grass, Delhi grass, vuda bluegrass, two-flowered golden-beard, Santa Barbara grass.

It is native to tropical Asia, the Middle East, and parts of Africa. In India, it is very important in agriculture. It has been introduced to many other parts of the world for cultivation, and it has become naturalized in some places, such as Australia.

== Description ==
This species is quite variable. In general, it is a perennial grass often with stolons. The stems spread outwards, then grow erect at the ends. A stem may be a meter long and reach about 60 centimeters in erect height. Each node on the stem is encircled with a ring of hairs. The rough-haired leaf blades are up to 30 centimeters long. The inflorescence is an array of purplish or green branches each up to 7 centimeters long. There are generally 2 to 9 branches, but sometimes up to 15. The spikelet may be well over 2 centimeters long, including its long awn. The awn is twisted and has two bends in it. The root system goes no deeper than one meter.

This grass often reproduces by apomixis, producing seeds without fertilization. It does reproduce sexually at times. Plants can be diploid, tetraploid, or hexaploid.

== In cultivation ==
This is a popular pasture grass in many areas. It can be used in fields for grazing livestock, and cut for hay and silage. It is tolerant of varied soil conditions, including soils high in clay and sand, poorly drained soils, and soils that are somewhat alkaline and saline. It forms a turf that can stand up to grazing pressure. It can recover from fire and drought, but it is less tolerant of frost and shade. It does not require fertilizer but it does respond well to a small amount of supplemental nitrogen. Horses and cattle find it very palatable.

While it can aggressively outcompete many other plants, it thrives with some types of companion species, such as the grasses Bothriochloa insculpta, Dichanthium aristatum, and D. caricosum, and the legumes Medicago sativa, Stylosanthes hamata, and S. seabrana.

The grass can also be used to revegetate degraded grasslands. It is a very effective binding plant for erosion control.

This is an especially favored pasture grass species in India. There it is familiar, widely planted, and successful.

Cultivars include 'Marvel 8'.

== Ecology ==
This grass is host to a number of fungus species, such as Balansia sclerotica, Cerebella andropogonis, Chaetostroma atrum, Cochliobolus cymbopogonis, Curvularia andropogonis, C. lunata, C. robusta, Ellisiella caudata, Jamesdicksonia obesa, Phyllachora ischaemi, Physoderma dichanthicola, Pithomyces graminicola, Puccinia cesatii, P. duthiae, P. propinqua, Sclerospora dichanthicola, Sphacelotheca annulata, S. andropogonis-annulati, Tolyposporella obesa, Uredo susica, Uromyces andropogonis-annulati, U. clignyi, and Ustilago duthiei. Most are not very destructive to the grass, but it is susceptible to ergot (Claviceps spp.).

It is also a host for the parasitic plant Striga lutea.

This grass can escape cultivation and take hold in the wild. It is able to grow in harsh and disturbed habitat types, such as roadsides. It can become a weed. It is an invasive species in Fiji, Hawaii, and New Caledonia and has displaced native grasses in large areas of south Texas. It is cited as a factor in the decline of the slender rushpea (Hoffmannseggia tenella) a federally listed endangered plant of the United States.
