= Bothriochloa compressa =

Scientific classification
- Kingdom: Plantae
- Clade: Tracheophytes
- Clade: Angiosperms
- Clade: Monocots
- Clade: Commelinids
- Order: Poales
- Family: Poaceae
- Subfamily: Panicoideae
- Genus: Bothriochloa
- Species: B. compressa

Binomial name
- Bothriochloa compressa (Hook. f.) Henrard

Species of plant

Bothriochloa compressa is a species of grass belonging to genus Bothriochloa. It is found in India.
