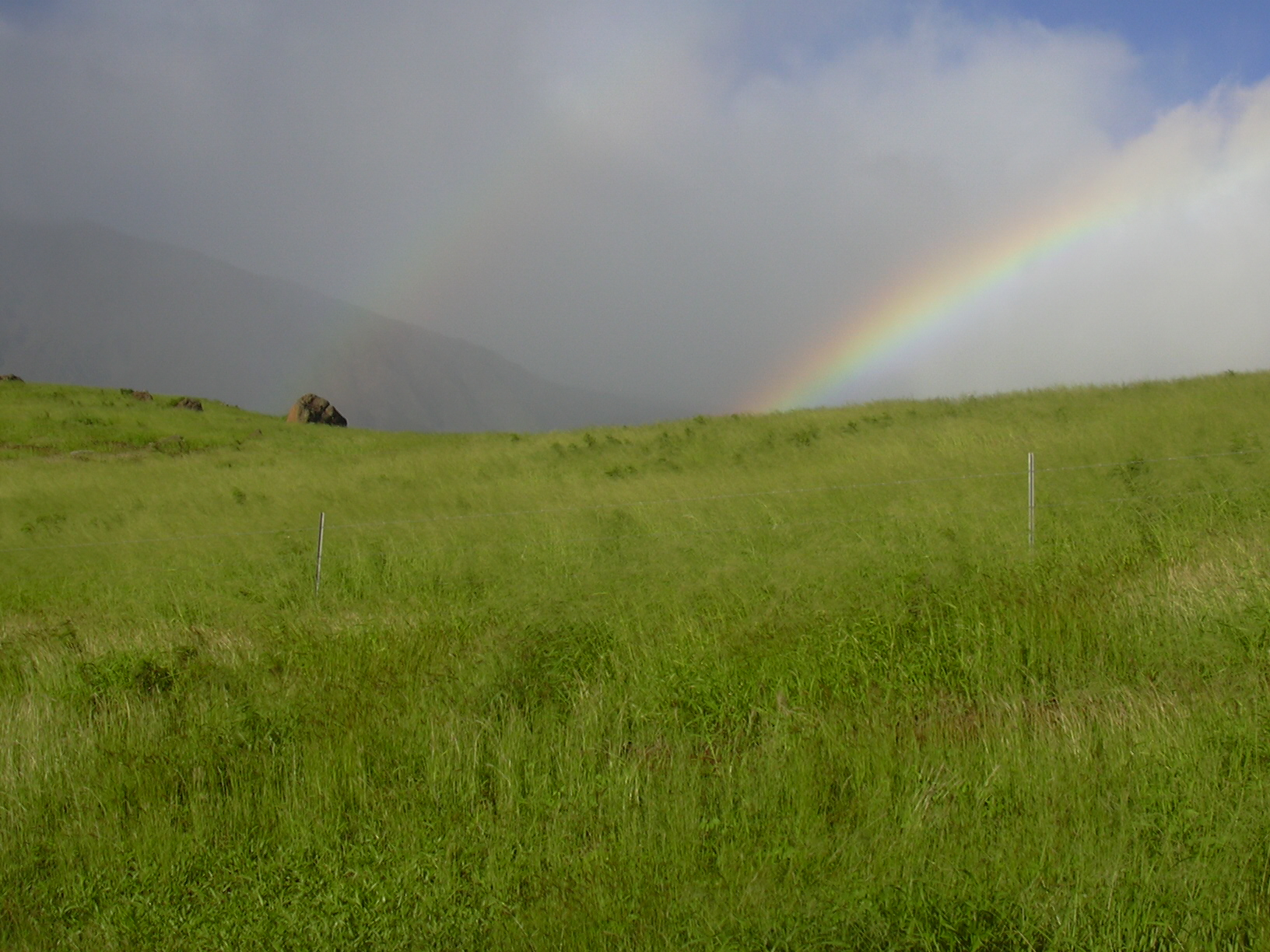
- A sward of Bothriochloa pertusa in Maui

Scientific classification
- Kingdom: Plantae
- Clade: Embryophytes
- Clade: Tracheophytes
- Clade: Angiosperms
- Clade: Monocots
- Clade: Commelinids
- Order: Poales
- Family: Poaceae
- Subfamily: Panicoideae
- Genus: Bothriochloa
- Species: B. pertusa

Binomial name
- Bothriochloa pertusa (L.) A.Camus

Synonyms
- Amphilophis pertusa; Andropogon pertusus; Dichanthium pertusum; Holcus pertusus

= Bothriochloa pertusa =

Species of plant

Bothriochloa pertusa is a species of grass. It is widely used as a fodder and a graze for livestock.

Common names for the plant include hurricane grass, Indian couch grass, Indian-bluegrass, pitted bluestem, Seymour grass, Barbados sourgrass, Antigua hay, pitted beardgrass, sweet pitted grass, silver grass (English), comagueyana, yerba huracán (Spanish), suket putihan, salay (Philippines), ya-hom, ya-hangma (Thailand), huyêt tha'o lô (Vietnam), and kong ying cao (Chinese).

The native range of the grass is probably in Asia, including China, India, Nepal, Pakistan, Sri Lanka, Thailand, Vietnam, Indonesia, and Malaysia. Its type locality was in India. It is now widespread outside its native range, having been purposely introduced to many regions, such as Australia, the Americas, the Pacific, and Africa. It is most common in tropical areas.

== Description ==
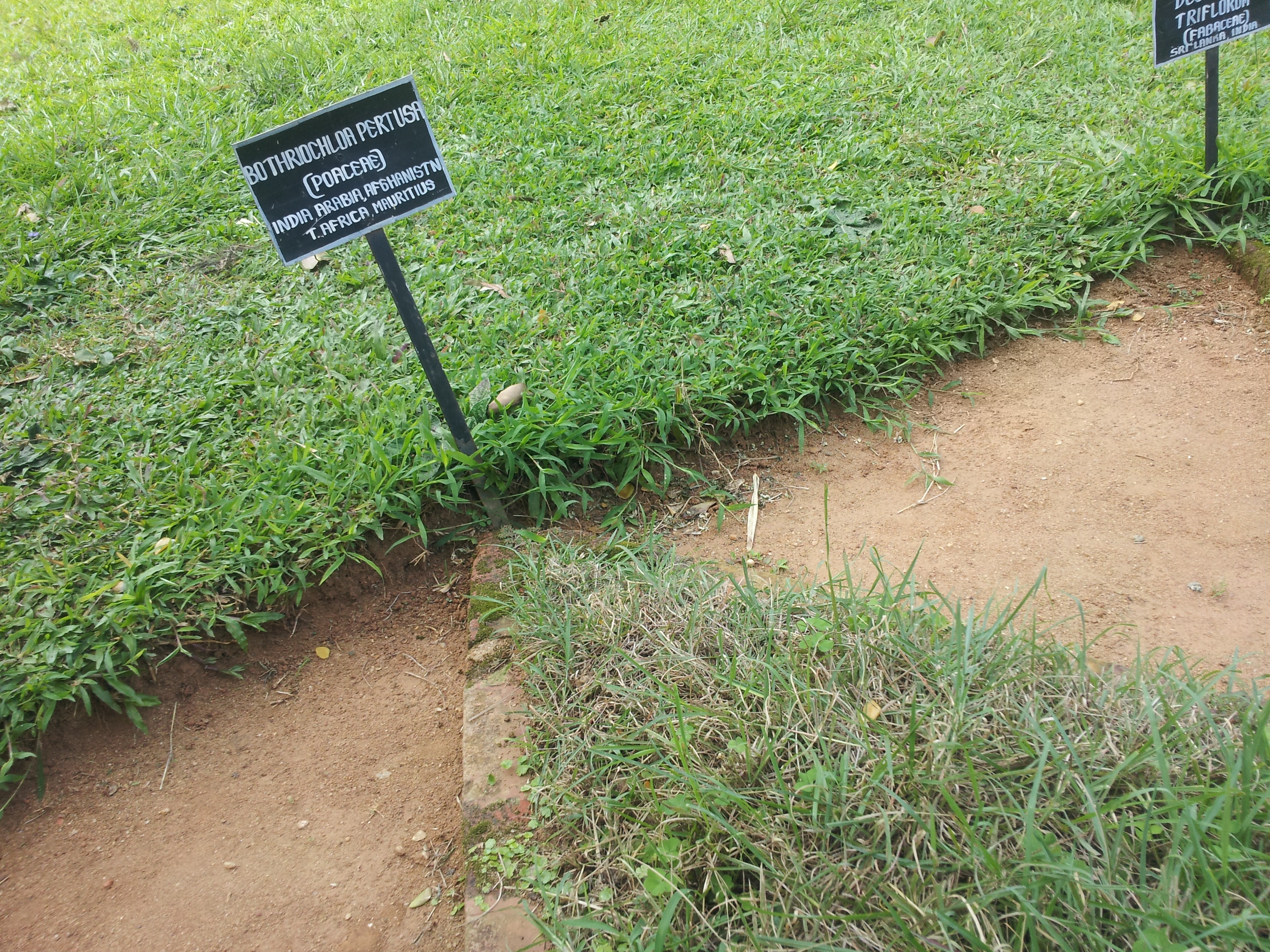
at Peradeniya Royal Botanical Garden

This is a perennial grass that spreads via stolons. The stolons may be pink or red. They can be robust; stolons measuring 1.6 meters have been observed. The stems are upright to erect and reach 60 to 100 centimeters tall. At times they may extend along the ground for a distance, rooting where stem nodes contact the soil. The leaves are up to 30 centimeters long; the upper leaves longer than the lower. The leaves are green to gray-green. The inflorescence is a bunch of very hairy racemes each a few centimeters long. Parts of the inflorescence can be purplish in color. The spikelet has a twisted awn up to 2 centimeters long. The grass is aromatic, with a scent like ginger when it is crushed.

== Habitat ==
In general, it requires tropical climates, and it does not tolerate frost. It is able to grow in many types of soils. It withstands drought and disturbance, and it can sprout up in dry, degraded habitat, such as roadsides. It survives short-term waterlogging and fire.

== Human uses ==
This grass is used as a lawn, as it can form a dense mat. It is occasionally seeded in landscaping projects, along roadsides and in degraded fields, for example. It is planted for erosion control and mine reclamation. It has been used in no-till systems, in which it is grown in a vegetable field, then killed off to provide ready mulch for the vegetable crop.

The grass is well known as a fodder for livestock. It is planted as a pasture grass and used for hay and silage. It tolerates trampling, grazing, and cutting. In heavily grazed fields it is favored, becoming dominant as other grasses are eliminated by grazing pressure. Palatability is reduced when the grass flowers.

Cultivars include 'Ghana Marvel 20', a high yield type developed in India, and the rust-resistant 'Dawson', 'Keppel', and 'Medway' from Queensland.

It is sometimes planted with companions such as the grasses Cenchrus ciliaris, Urochloa mosambicensis, and Digitaria didactyla, and legumes such as Centrosema pascuorum, Chamaecrista rotundifolia, and Lotononis bainesii.

== Ecology ==
A widely introduced species, it has become naturalized in many regions, and at times has become a noxious weed. It has been especially difficult to control in the Virgin Islands. Its vigorous stoloniferous growth helps it outcompete native plants. It produces choking mats and shades out other species. The hairy seeds can be spread when they stick to animals.

This grass is host to many fungi, such as Balansia sclerotica, Claviceps purpurea, Physoderma bothriochloae, Puccinia cesatii, P. duthiae, Sphacelotheca tenuis, Stollia bothriochloae, and Uromyces andropogonis-annulati. Some fungi are pathogenic, causing rust and ergot.

In New Caledonia this grass is food for the Javan rusa (Rusa timorensis russa). It became invasive in this zone.
