= Bothriochloa campii =

Conservation status
- Endangered (IUCN 3.1)

Scientific classification
- Kingdom: Plantae
- Clade: Tracheophytes
- Clade: Angiosperms
- Clade: Monocots
- Clade: Commelinids
- Order: Poales
- Family: Poaceae
- Subfamily: Panicoideae
- Genus: Bothriochloa
- Species: B. campii

Binomial name
- Bothriochloa campii (Swallen) de Wet

Species of grass

Bothriochloa campii is a species of grass in the family Poaceae. It is found only in Ecuador.
