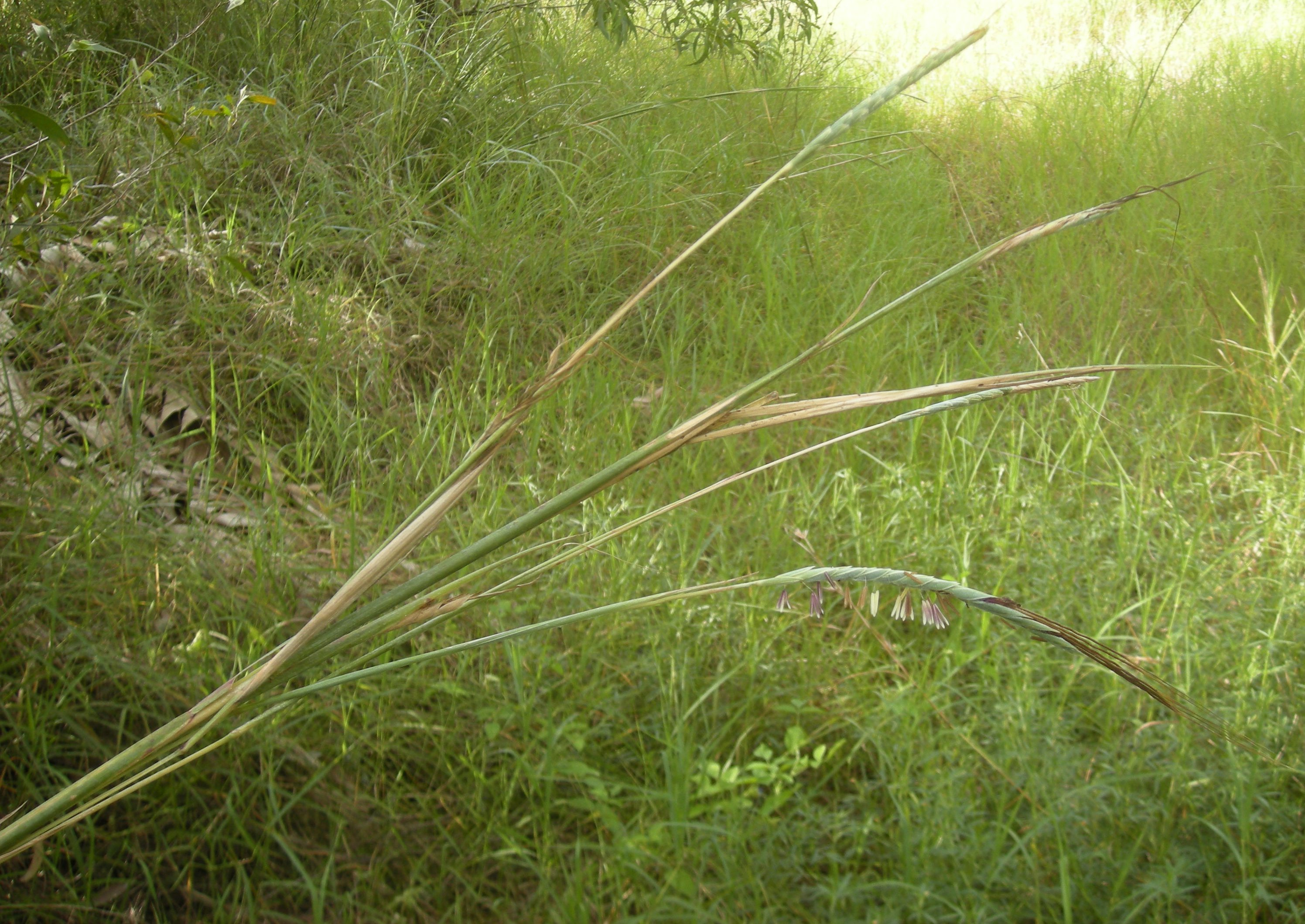

Scientific classification
- Kingdom: Plantae
- Clade: Tracheophytes
- Clade: Angiosperms
- Clade: Monocots
- Clade: Commelinids
- Order: Poales
- Family: Poaceae
- Subfamily: Panicoideae
- Genus: Heteropogon
- Species: H. triticeus

Binomial name
- Heteropogon triticeus (R.Br.) Stapf ex Craib

Synonyms
- Andropogon triticeus R.Br. Sorghum triticeum (R.Br.) Kuntze; Andropogon ischyranthus Steud. Andropogon lianatherus Steud. Andropogon segaensis Steud. Heteropogon insignis Thwaites; Heteropogon ischyranthus (Steud.) Miq. Heteropogon lianatherus (Steud.) Miq. Heteropogon roylei Nees ex Steud.

= Heteropogon triticeus =

Species of grass

Heteropogon triticeus is a tropical, perennial tussock grass with a native distribution encompassing Tropical and Temperate Asia, Malesia and Northern and Eastern Australia. The plant grows to over 2 metres (6.6 ft) in height and is favoured in most environments by frequent burning. The plants develop characteristic dark seeds with a single long awn at one end and a sharp spike at the other. The awn becomes twisted when dry and straightens when moistened, and in combination with the spike is capable of drilling the seed into the soil.

The species is known as giant spear grass, and is closely related to the more common black spear grass, with which it is commonly associated in Northern Australia.

It is sometimes sucked by Indigenous Australian communities in the Northern Territory for its sweet liquid.
