= Trachypogon macroglossus =

Scientific classification
- Kingdom: Plantae
- Clade: Tracheophytes
- Clade: Angiosperms
- Clade: Monocots
- Clade: Commelinids
- Order: Poales
- Family: Poaceae
- Subfamily: Panicoideae
- Genus: Trachypogon
- Species: T. macroglossus

Binomial name
- Trachypogon macroglossus Trinius, 1833

Synonyms
- List: Andropogon macroglossus (Trin.) Steud.; Trachypogon polymorphus var. macroglossus (Trin.) Hack.; Trachypogon filifolius (Hack.) Hitchc.; Trachypogon polymorphus var. filifolius Hack.; Trachypogon renvoizei Catasús

Species of flowering plant

Trachypogon macroglossus is a perennial species of flowering plant belonging to the grass family (Poaceae) and can be found in Brazil, Cuba and Puerto Rico. It was first described by the Carl Bernhard von Trinius in 1833.

== Description ==
Trachypogon macroglossus grows perennial and builds dense tufts. Culms are slender, erect, wiry and 40–100 cm (16–39 in) high. The nodes are prominently covered by hairs. Leaf blades are very narrow, fine and rolled inwards lengthwise, which is often an adaptation to dry habitats. The ligule is membranous and variable in length often between 3–5 mm (0.12–0.20 in) but sometimes up to 5 cm (2 in). If auricles are present they are erect.

When the plant starts flowering an inflorescence in form of one raceme emerges, which is 5–15 cm (2–6 in) long and might be straight or lightly flexuous. Its rachis is tough, nearly cylindrical with linear internodes which end in a flattened tip. Spikelets appear in pairs, one fertile and one shorter sterile companion. Besides being sterile the companion spikelet is well developed and functionally male. Glumes are papery, firm, distinctly veined and hairy. The fertile spikelet contains one basal, sterile and one fertile floret. The fertile floret is linear, with a hyaline lemma, with a very reduced palea. The very prominent awn sits on the fertile lemma.

== Ecology and distribution ==
Trachypogon macroglossus distribution range includes botanical regions of Brazil (south, southeast, northeast and west-central). The species has also been reported from Cuba and Puerto Rico. It grows terrestrial in seasonally dry tropical habitats, in Brazil the species prefers vegetation types of Campo limpo (open grassland), Campos rupestres (rocky grassland), Cerrado (sensu lato) and Palmeira (palm groves).

When comparing seeds across dry and wet Cerrado habitats T. macroglossus showed better storability and higher seed weight from individuals from dry areas.
