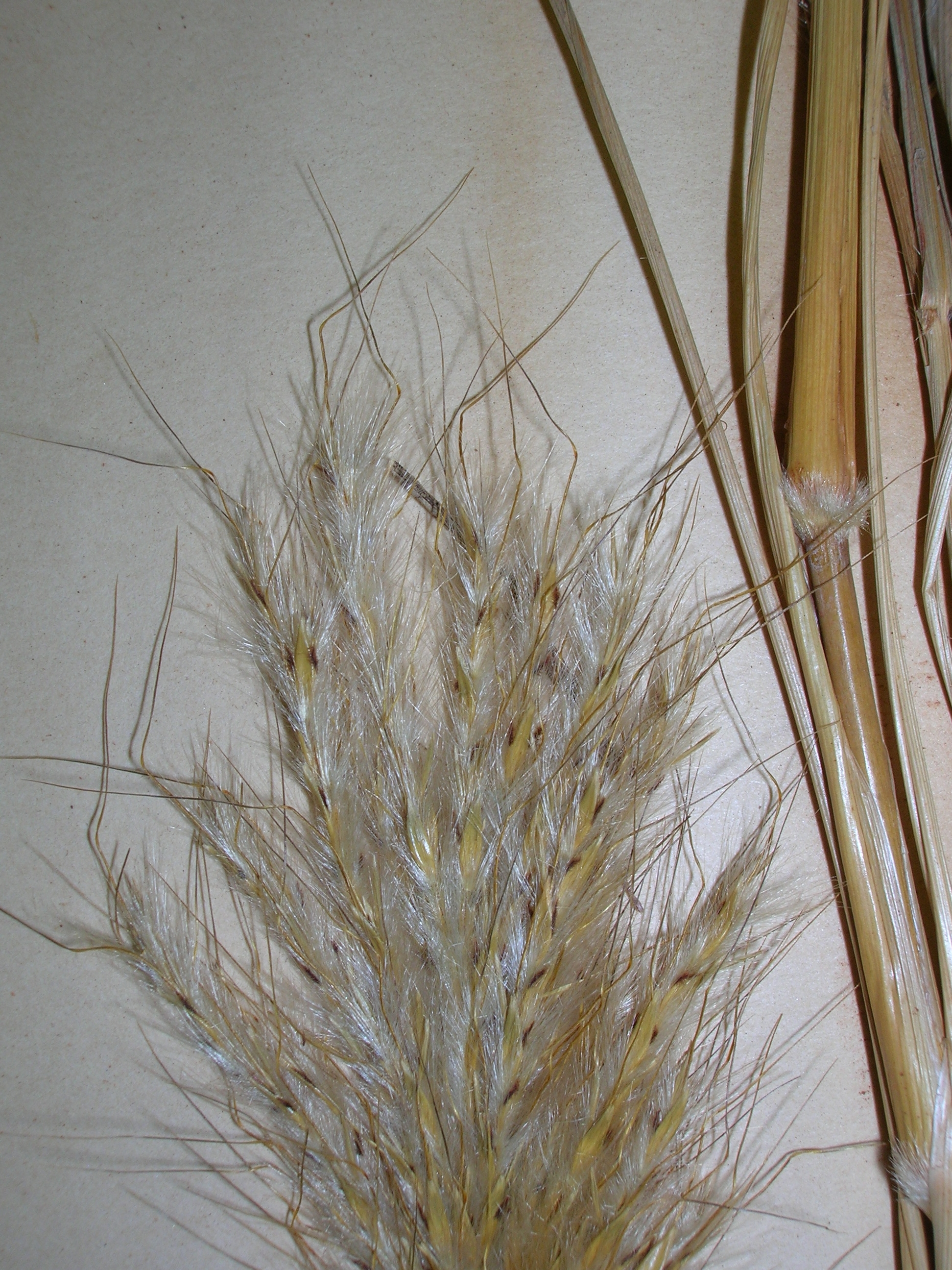

Conservation status
- Secure (NatureServe)

Scientific classification
- Kingdom: Plantae
- Clade: Tracheophytes
- Clade: Angiosperms
- Clade: Monocots
- Clade: Commelinids
- Order: Poales
- Family: Poaceae
- Subfamily: Panicoideae
- Genus: Bothriochloa
- Species: B. barbinodis

Binomial name
- Bothriochloa barbinodis (Lag.) Herter

Synonyms
- Andropogon barbinodis Andropogon perforatus Bothriochloa palmeri

= Bothriochloa barbinodis =

Species of plant

Bothriochloa barbinodis is a species of grass known by the common name cane bluestem. It is native to the Americas, including most of South and Central America, Mexico, and the southernmost continental United States from California to Florida.

It is a perennial bunchgrass growing in upright clumps 60 to 120 centimetres (24 to 47 in) tall. The straw-colored stems have nodes at intervals, which are fringed with fluffy hairs. The leaves are 20 to 30 centimetres (8 to 12 in) long and blue-green when new, drying to a reddish yellow. The inflorescence is a feathery array of spikelet units. Each unit is composed of one hairy, tan, fertile spikelet with a twisted awn up to 3.5 centimetres (1.4 in) long twinned with a stalked, sterile spikelet which is much smaller and lacks an awn. The long-haired spikelets are wind-dispersed.

In its native range, this grass is used as a forage for grazing animals and a ground cover for revegetating cleared land. It is very drought resistant. It is considered an indicator of rangeland damage, as it is often one of the first native species to be eliminated when an area is overgrazed.

It is known elsewhere as an introduced species and sometimes a weed, such as in Hawaii.

It is grown as an ornamental plant for its showy inflorescences.
