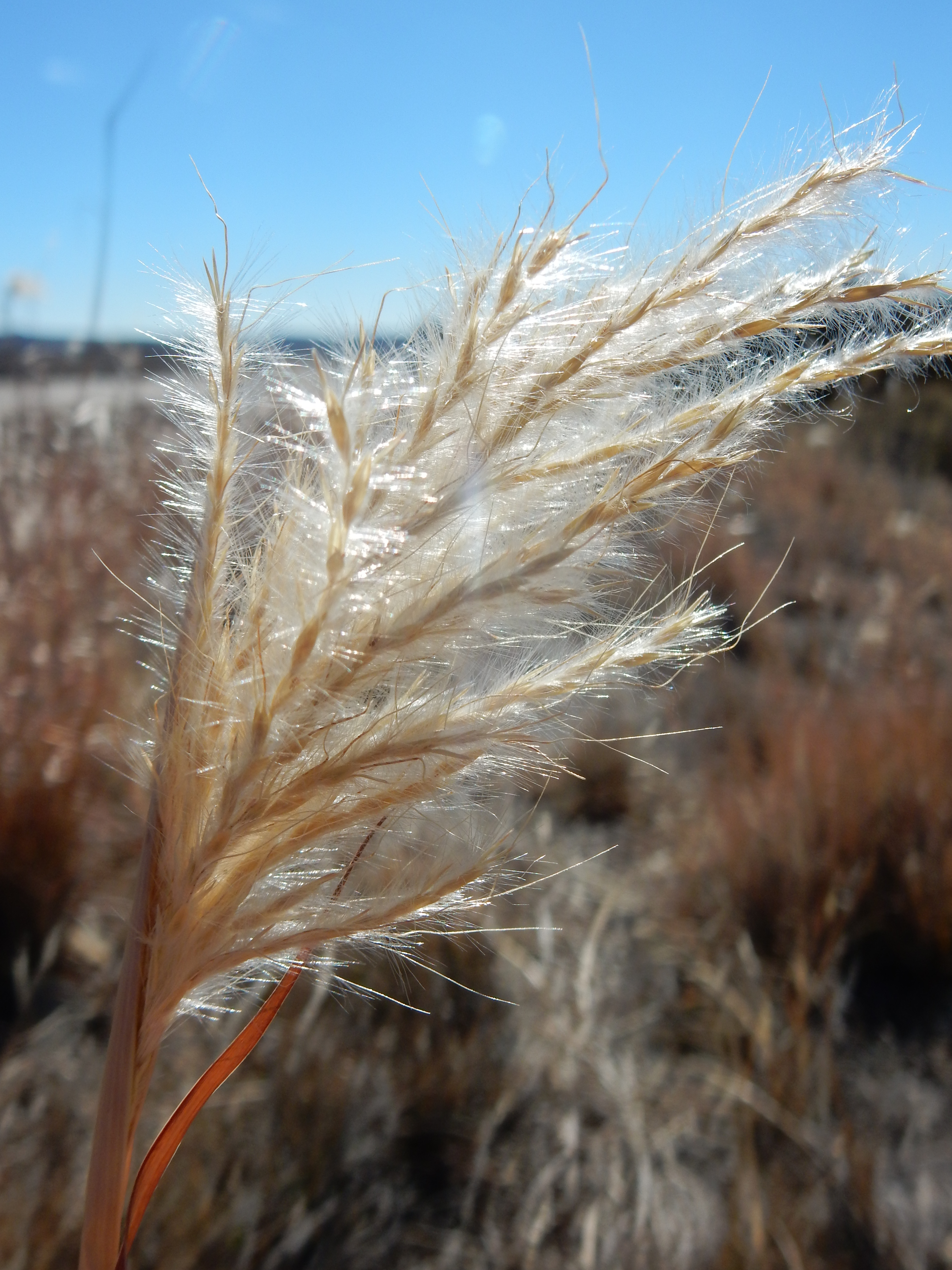
- On a roadside in New Mexico

Scientific classification
- Kingdom: Plantae
- Clade: Tracheophytes
- Clade: Angiosperms
- Clade: Monocots
- Clade: Commelinids
- Order: Poales
- Family: Poaceae
- Subfamily: Panicoideae
- Genus: Bothriochloa
- Species: B. laguroides

Binomial name
- Bothriochloa laguroides (DC) Herter

Synonyms
- Andropogon laguriformis; Andropogon laguroides; Andropogon tenuirachis; Bothriochloa saccharoides var. laguroides

= Bothriochloa laguroides =

Species of plant

Bothriochloa laguroides, the silver beard grass, is a species of grass in the genus Bothriochloa of the family Poaceae. The species is native to Mexico and South America.
