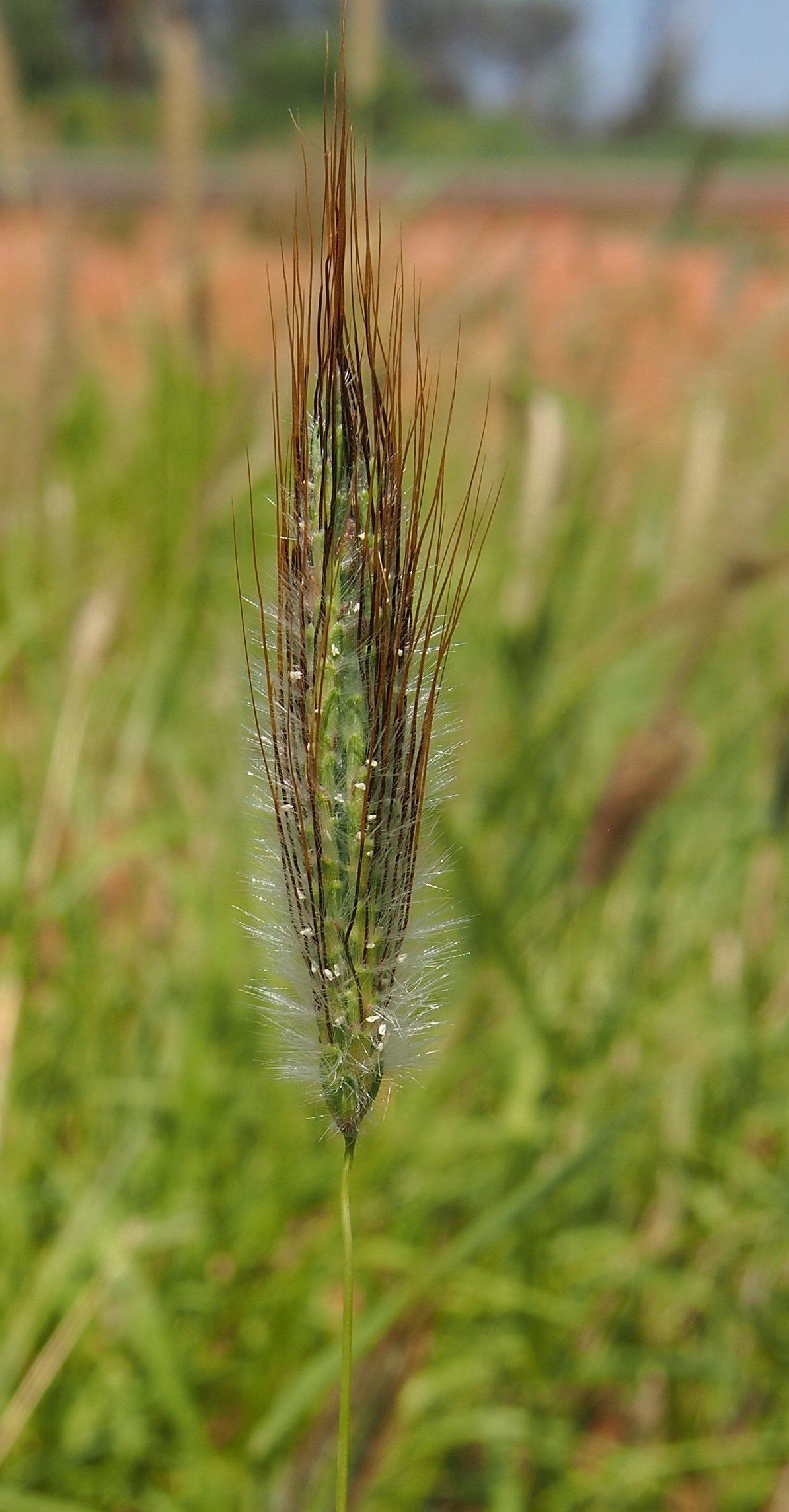
- Dichanthium sericeum

Scientific classification
- Kingdom: Plantae
- Clade: Embryophytes
- Clade: Tracheophytes
- Clade: Spermatophytes
- Clade: Angiosperms
- Clade: Monocots
- Clade: Commelinids
- Order: Poales
- Family: Poaceae
- Subfamily: Panicoideae
- Supertribe: Andropogonodae
- Tribe: Andropogoneae
- Subtribe: Andropogoninae
- Genus: Dichanthium; Willemet

Type species
- Dichanthium nodosum Willemet

Synonyms
- Andropogon subg. Dichanthium (Willemet) Hack.; Diplasanthum Desv.; Eremopogon Stapf; Gymnandropogon (Nees) Duthie; Lepeocercis Trin.

= Dichanthium =

Genus of plants

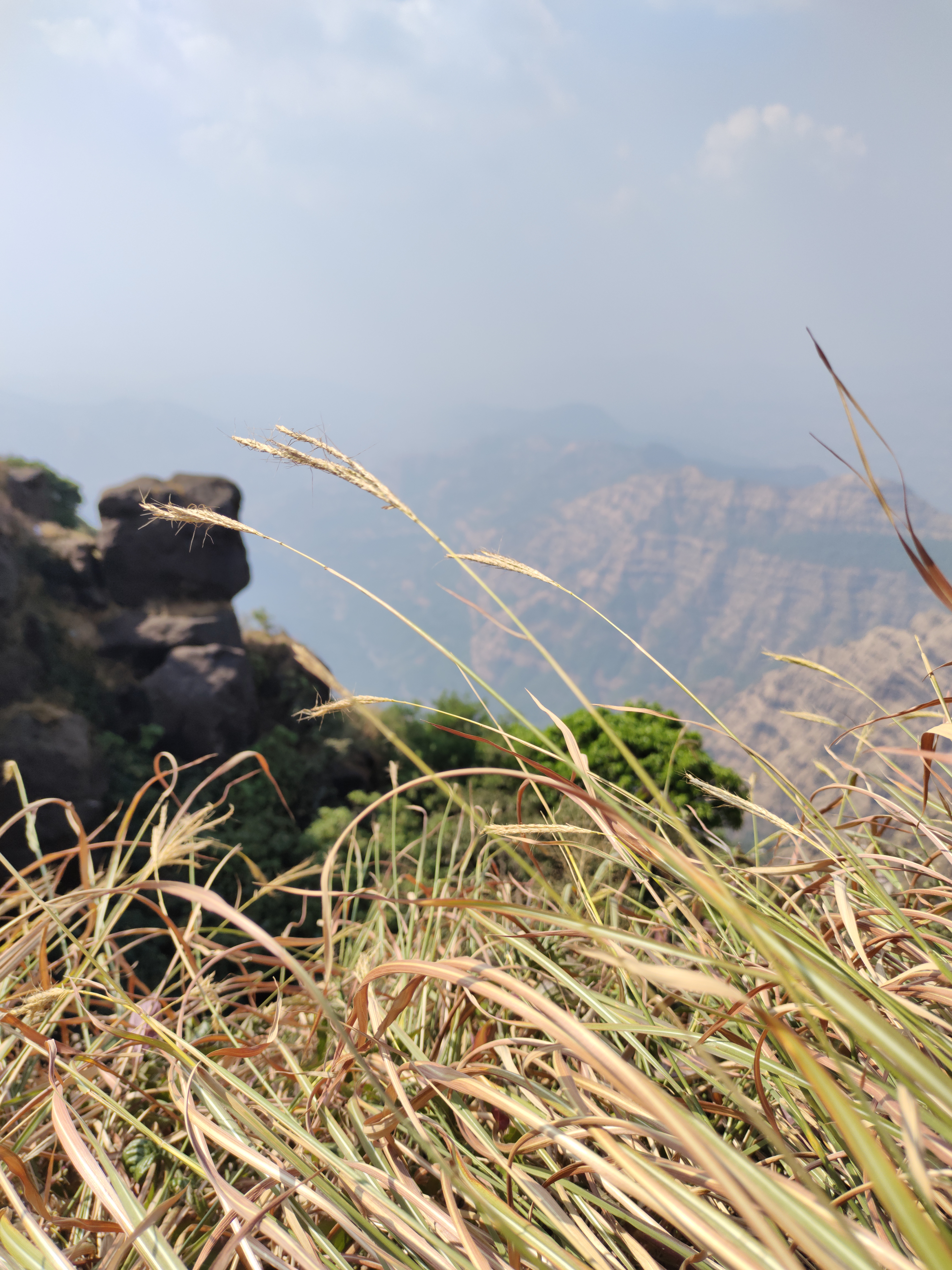
Dichanthium jainii at the edge of a cliff.

Dichanthium, known commonly as bluestem or bluegrass, is a genus of African, Asian, and Australian plants in the grass family.

Some species have become naturalized in the Americas and on various oceanic islands.

== Species ==
Species include:

- Dichanthium andringitrense - Queensland
- Dichanthium annulatum - Kleberg's bluestem, marvel grass - Asia, Africa, Madagascar, Mauritius, Australia; naturalised in North + South America, Crete, Canary Islands, certain Pacific Islands including Hawaii
- Dichanthium aristatum - Angleton bluestem - Yunnan, Taiwan, Thailand, Philippines, Java, Lesser Sunda Islands, India; naturalised in North + South America, Queensland, various islands in Indian Ocean, Pacific, + West Indies
- Dichanthium armatum - Gujarat
- Dichanthium caricosum - Indian Subcontinent, Indochina, Guizhou, Yunnan, Java, Malaysia
- Dichanthium concanense - Maharashtra
- Dichanthium erectum - Lesser Sunda Islands
- Dichanthium fecundum - New Guinea
- Dichanthium foulkesii - Indian Subcontinent, Nicobar Islands
- Dichanthium foveolatum - Asia + Africa from Morocco + Canary Islands to Bangladesh
- Dichanthium mccannii - Maharashtra
- Dichanthium micranthum - Oman
- Dichanthium mucronulatum - Thailand, Pen Malaysia
- Dichanthium oliganthum - Maharashtra, Tamil Nadu, Myanmar
- Dichanthium panchganiense - Maharashtra
- Dichanthium pertusum - Maharashtra, Karnataka
- Dichanthium paranjpyeanum - Maharashtra
- Dichanthium queenslandicum - Queensland
- Dichanthium sericeum - silky bluestem - Australia, New Guinea, New Caledonia, Southeast Asia; naturalized in scattered locales in North America
- Dichanthium setosum - Queensland, New South Wales, Tasmania
- Dichanthium tenue - slender bluestem - Queensland, New South Wales
- Dichanthium tenuiculum - Luzon
- Dichanthium tuberculatum - Madhya Pradesh

== Former species ==
Several species formerly included are now regarded as better suited to other genera, including in: Andropogon, Bothriochloa, Capillipedium, Euclasta, and Pseudodichanthium.
