= Heteropogon melanocarpus =

Scientific classification
- Kingdom: Plantae
- Clade: Tracheophytes
- Clade: Angiosperms
- Clade: Monocots
- Clade: Commelinids
- Order: Poales
- Family: Poaceae
- Subfamily: Panicoideae
- Genus: Heteropogon
- Species: H. melanocarpus

Binomial name
- Heteropogon melanocarpus (Elliott) Benth.

Species of plant

Heteropogon melanocarpus, commonly known as sweet tanglehead or buzzard grass, is an annual graminoid in the family Poaceae found throughout the tropics and subtropics globally. It was first described by George Bentham in 1881.

== Description ==
Heteropogon melanocarpus illustration in Manual of the grasses of the United States. 1950

H. melanocarpus is a coarse annual grass with glabrous culms ranging from 0.8 to 2 meters tall. Leaves are primarily cauline, with blades up to 40 cm long and about 1 cm wide. The upper surface near the collar region is long-pilose, margins are slightly rough, and sheaths are mostly glabrous, sometimes glandular, with the upper sheaths inflated and often scarious along the margins. Ligules are membranous, lacerate, and measure 2–4 mm in length. The inflorescence consists of compact, pedunculate racemes that emerge from the inflated upper sheaths. Racemes are 2–4 cm long (excluding awns). Each contains a fertile and staminate sessile spikelet paired with a staminate, pedicellate spikelet. The first glume of the pedicellate spikelet is asymmetric, prominently nerved, acuminate, and 12–17 mm long, with one margin winged and glandular-punctate; the second glume is membranous and similar in shape. Fertile and sterile lemmas are hyaline and reduced, lacking a palea. The awn of the fertile lemma is twisted, genticulate, brown-hirsute, and can reach up to 10 cm in length. The callus is appressed, brown-hirsute, and 2–3 mm long. Grains are yellowish, linear, cylindrical (terete), and approximately 4 mm in length.

== Distribution and habitat ==
In the United States, H. melanocarpus is found from North Carolina south to Florida and west to Arizona. It thought to be naturalized from the Old World, and is widespread in the Old World and New World tropics and subtropics. It grows along sandy roadsides and in disturbed areas. It is known to persist through repeated disturbance from prescribed fire.

Outside of the US it can also be found in many countries in central and south America, central, east and west Africa as well as India and China (south-central). Where H. melanocarpus grows in subtropical and tropical regions.
