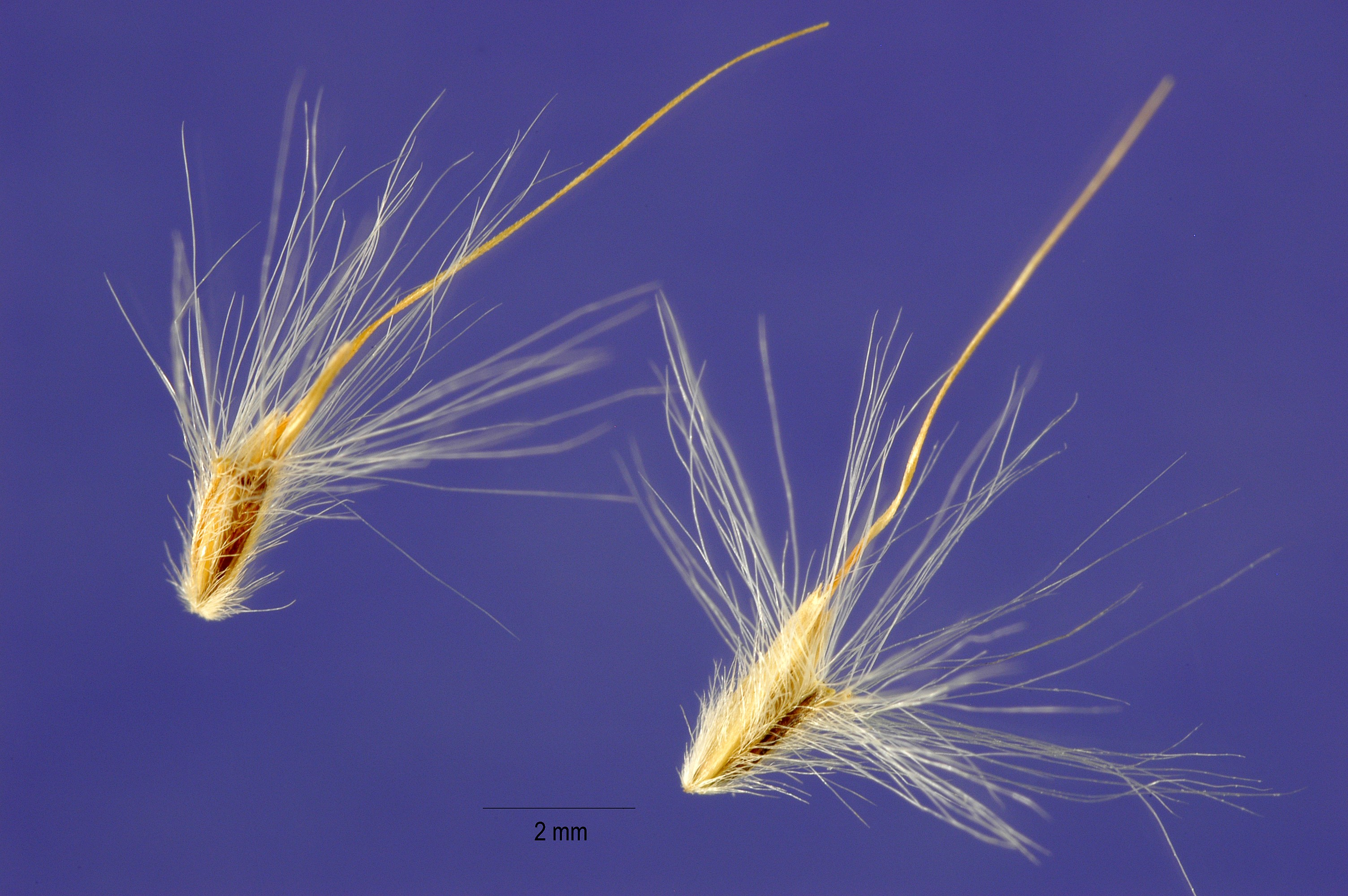
- Seeds

Conservation status
- Secure (NatureServe)

Scientific classification
- Kingdom: Plantae
- Clade: Tracheophytes
- Clade: Angiosperms
- Clade: Monocots
- Clade: Commelinids
- Order: Poales
- Family: Poaceae
- Subfamily: Panicoideae
- Genus: Bothriochloa
- Species: B. saccharoides

Binomial name
- Bothriochloa saccharoides (Sw.) Rydb.

= Bothriochloa saccharoides =

Species of grass

Bothriochloa saccharoides is a species of grass known by the common name silver bluestem. It is native to the Americas, including Mexico, the Caribbean, and parts of Central and South America.

This perennial bunchgrass grows to 2 to 3 feet in height. The leaves reach 8 inches long. The stems are often purplish toward the base. The inflorescence is white and hairy. The plant produces many seeds.

This species is used for grazing cattle, especially in the spring before the inflorescences form. Goats eat the seed heads. The grass can be added to a hay mix.
