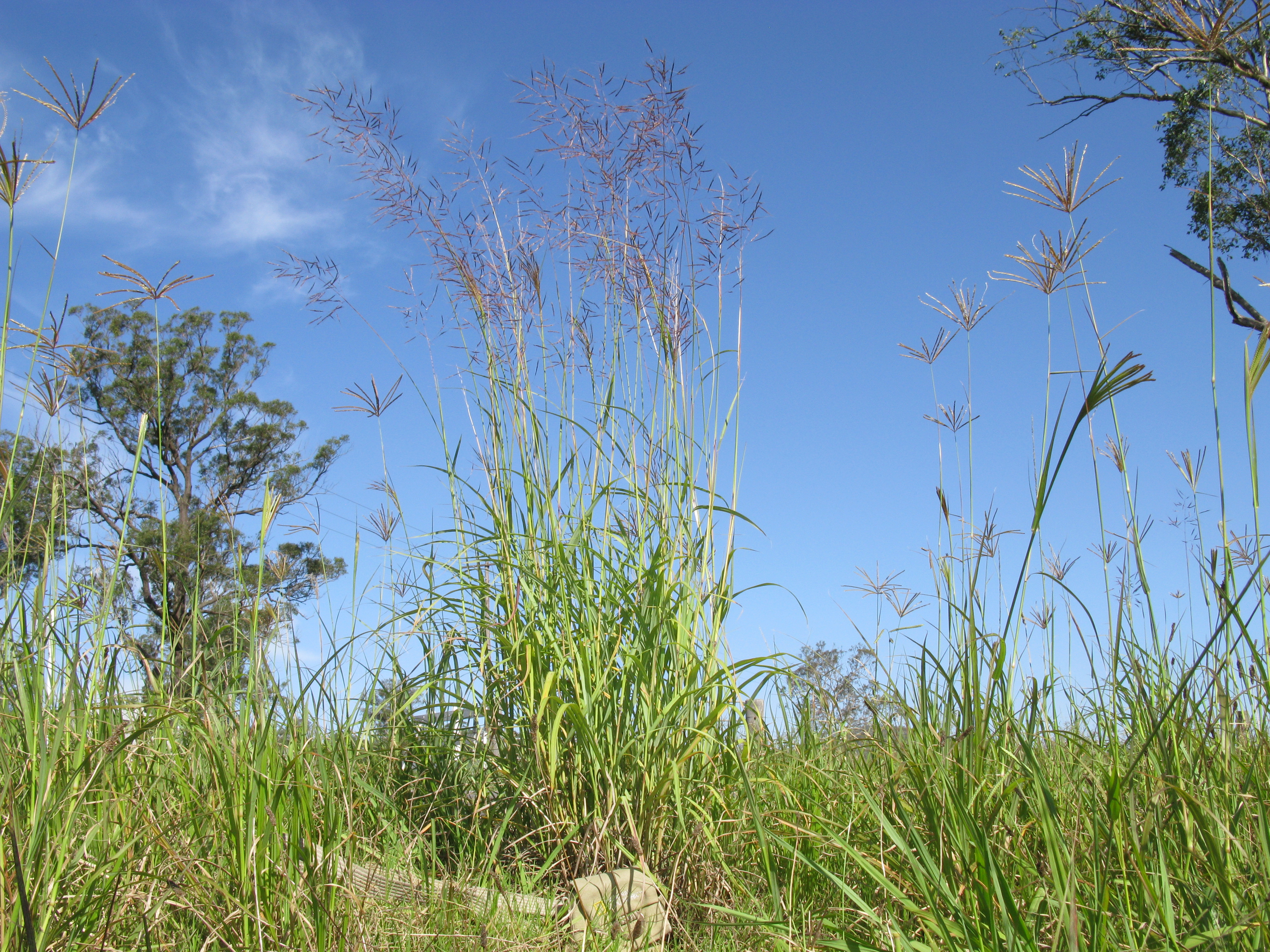

Scientific classification
- Kingdom: Plantae
- Clade: Tracheophytes
- Clade: Angiosperms
- Clade: Monocots
- Clade: Commelinids
- Order: Poales
- Family: Poaceae
- Subfamily: Panicoideae
- Genus: Capillipedium
- Species: C. spicigerum

Binomial name
- Capillipedium spicigerum S.T.Blake

= Capillipedium spicigerum =

Species of grass

Capillipedium spicigerum, commonly known as scented-top grass, is a species of perennial grass in the family Poaceae that is native to Australia.

== Description ==
Capillipedium spicigerum is a tufted perennial bunchgrass, without stolons or rhizomes. The culms, or stems of the grass grow to 1.5 m (4 ft 11 in) in height and have hairy nodes.

The lower leaf sheaths of the plant are silky hairy. The leaf blades are 30–40 cm (12–16 in) long and 5–8 mm (0.20–0.31 in) wide at the base.

The inflorescence of the plant, or the collections of flowers, are a purplish open panicle, 10–20 cm (3.9–7.9 in) long with short racemes on slender branches. The flowers emit a scent when crushed. The racemes have 3 to 8 pairs of spikelets, one stalked the other unstalked. Flowering is late spring to autumn.

A close relative to Capillipedium spicigerum seems to be C. mistryi A. P. Tiwari & Landge from India. For more details refer to

== Taxonomy ==
Capillipedium spicigerum was described by S.T. Blake in 1944.

== Habitat and ecology ==
Capillipedium spicigerum is found on lower fertility soils of roadsides, native pastures and woodlands of Queensland, New South Wales, and the Northern Territory. C. spicigerum is very drought tolerant and readily grazed.
