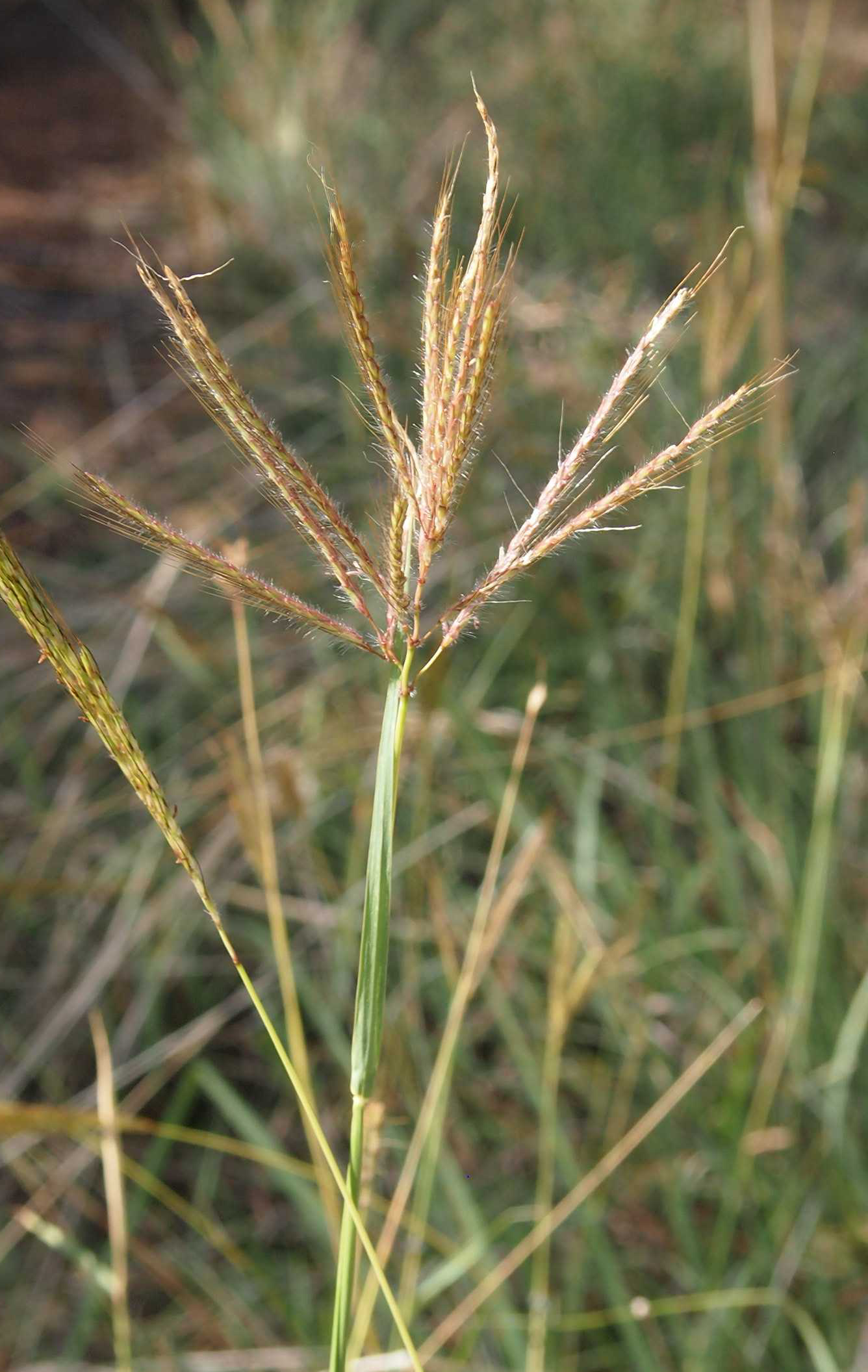

Scientific classification
- Kingdom: Plantae
- Clade: Tracheophytes
- Clade: Angiosperms
- Clade: Monocots
- Clade: Commelinids
- Order: Poales
- Family: Poaceae
- Subfamily: Panicoideae
- Genus: Bothriochloa
- Species: B. bladhii

Binomial name
- Bothriochloa bladhii (Retz.) S.T.Blake

Synonyms
- Amphilophis intermedia var. acidula (Stapf) Stapf; Andropogon bladhii Retz. (basionym); A. caucasicus Trin.; A. glaber Roxb.; A. intermedius R.Br.; A. intermedius var. caucasicus (Trin.) Hack.; A. pertusus var. vegetior Hack.; Bothriochloa caucasica (Trin.) C.E.Hubb.; B. glabra (Roxb.) A.Camus; B. insculpta var. vegetior (Hack.) C.E.Hubb.; B. intermedia (R.Br.) A.Camus; B. intermedia var. punctata (Roxb.) Keng

= Bothriochloa bladhii =

Species of plant

Bothriochloa bladhii (commonly called, variously, Australian bluestem, Caucasian bluestem, forest-bluegrass, plains bluestem, and purple plume grass) is a Neotropic grass in the family Poaceae, found primarily in tropical Africa, and tropical and temperate Asia, and Australia. The type specimen was collected from China by Finnish botanist Peter Johan Bladh. The name of Bladh is honored in the specific epithet.

== Distribution ==
Bothriochloa bladhii is native to Africa from Senegal and Ethiopia southwards to South Africa; the Middle East; much of temperate and tropical, southern and eastern Asia, Malesia, and Australia.

Bothriochloa bladhii has also become naturalized elsewhere in the neotropics.

== Uses ==
Bothriochloa bladhii is used as stored food for local livestock, and as a grazing plant by both livestock and wild ruminants. It is sometimes planted as a revegetator, to restore disturbed land.
