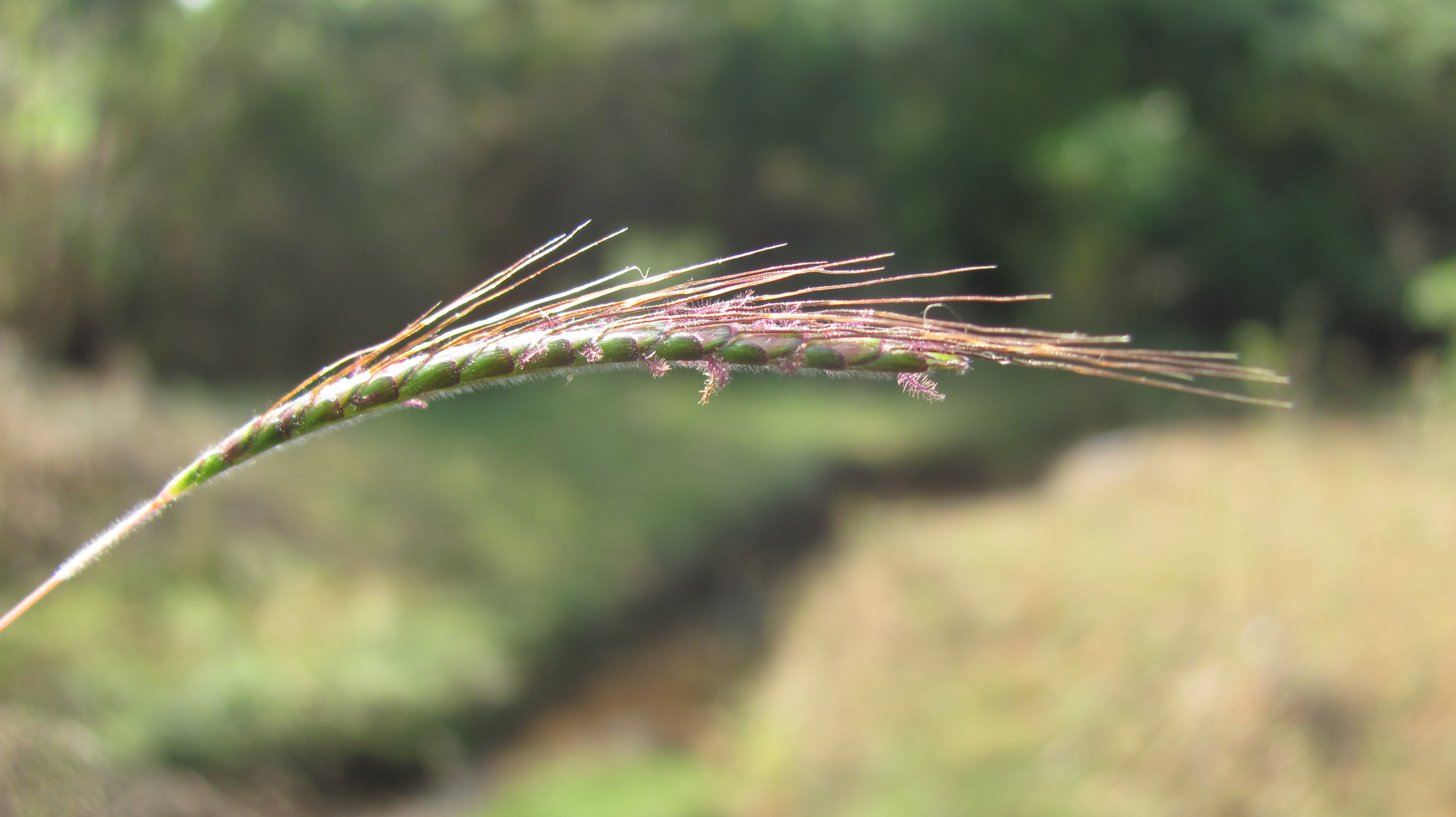

Scientific classification
- Kingdom: Plantae
- Clade: Tracheophytes
- Clade: Angiosperms
- Clade: Monocots
- Clade: Commelinids
- Order: Poales
- Family: Poaceae
- Subfamily: Panicoideae
- Genus: Dichanthium
- Species: D. aristatum

Binomial name
- Dichanthium aristatum (Poir.) C.E.Hubb.

Synonyms
- Andropogon aristatus Poir. Andropogon caricosus subsp. mollicomus (Kunth) Hack. Andropogon caricosus var. mollicomus (Kunth) Hack. Andropogon mollicomus Kunth

= Dichanthium aristatum =

Species of plant

Dichanthium aristatum is a species of grass in the family Poaceae. It is commonly used as a forage for livestock.

Common names include angleton grass in Australia and Cuba; alabang X in the Philippines; angleton blue-stem or yellow bluestem in the United States; wildergrass in Hawai'i; hierba.
