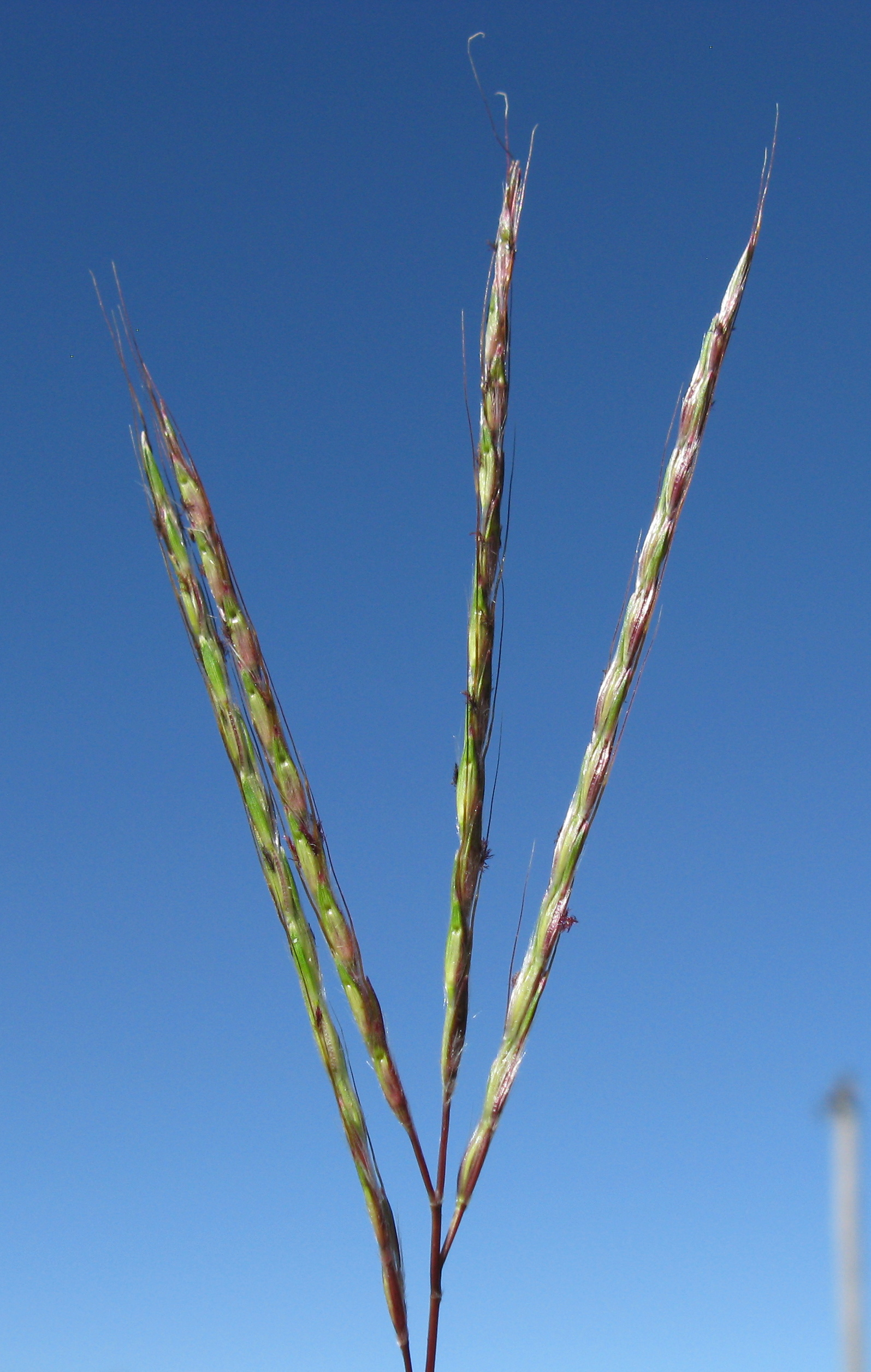

Scientific classification
- Kingdom: Plantae
- Clade: Tracheophytes
- Clade: Angiosperms
- Clade: Monocots
- Clade: Commelinids
- Order: Poales
- Family: Poaceae
- Subfamily: Panicoideae
- Genus: Bothriochloa
- Species: B. macra

Binomial name
- Bothriochloa macra (Steud.) S.T.Blake

= Bothriochloa macra =

Species of plant

Bothriochloa macra, commonly known as red-leg grass, red grass, redleg or pitted beard grass is a perennial grass species that is native to eastern Australia and New Zealand. It is naturalised in Tasmania and Norfolk Island.
