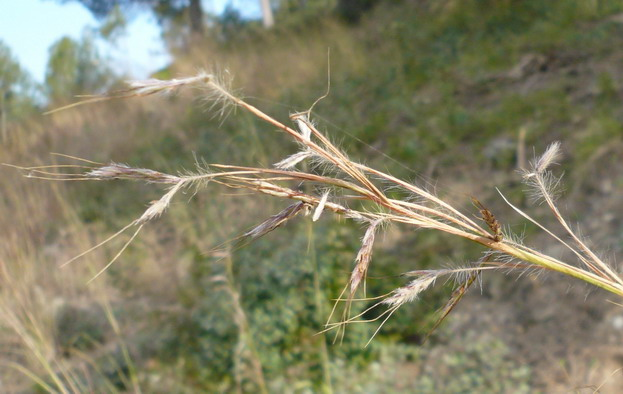

Scientific classification
- Kingdom: Plantae
- Clade: Embryophytes
- Clade: Tracheophytes
- Clade: Angiosperms
- Clade: Monocots
- Clade: Commelinids
- Order: Poales
- Family: Poaceae
- Subfamily: Panicoideae
- Genus: Hyparrhenia
- Species: H. hirta

Binomial name
- Hyparrhenia hirta (L.) Stapf

= Hyparrhenia hirta =

Species of flowering plant in the grass family

Hyparrhenia hirta is a species of grass known by the common names common thatching grass and Coolatai grass. It is native to much of Africa and Eurasia, and it is known on other continents as an introduced species. In eastern Australia it is a tenacious noxious weed. In South Africa, where it is native, it is very common and one of the most widely used thatching grasses. It is also used for grazing livestock and weaving mats and baskets.

This is a perennial grass forming clumps 30 centimetres (12 in) to 1 metre (3 ft 3 in) tall with tough, dense bases sprouting from rhizomes. The inflorescence atop the wiry stem is a panicle of hairy spikelets with bent awns up to 3.5 centimetres (1.4 in) long. The grass can grow in a variety of habitat types, in dry conditions, heavy, rocky, eroded soils, and disturbed areas.
