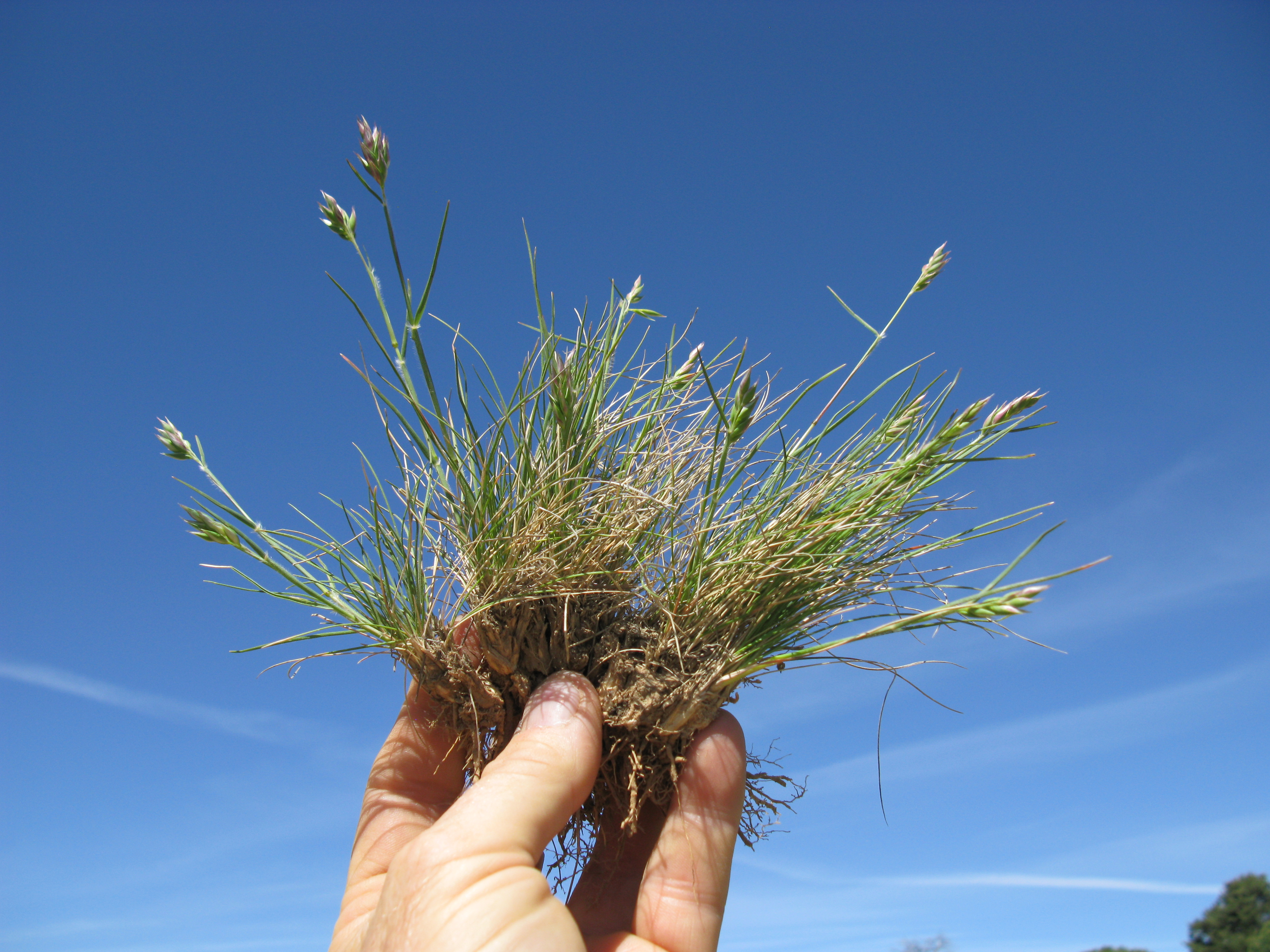

Scientific classification
- Kingdom: Plantae
- Clade: Tracheophytes
- Clade: Angiosperms
- Clade: Monocots
- Clade: Commelinids
- Order: Poales
- Family: Poaceae
- Genus: Rytidosperma
- Species: R. carphoides

Binomial name
- Rytidosperma carphoides (F.Muell. ex Benth.) Connor & Edgar

= Rytidosperma carphoides =

Species of plant

Rytidosperma carphoides, the short wallaby grass, is a species of true grass in the subfamily Danthonioideae. It is endemic to Australia and was described as Danthonia carphoides in 1878. It is naturalised in New Zealand.

== Description ==
Rytidosperma carphoides is a short grass (usually 30cm or less high) with finely rolled leaves and compact inflorescences. Like other Rytidosperma, its florets have long glumes that are much longer than the lemmas, and lemmas that are forked into two lobes, with an awn between the lobes. On R. carphoides, the lemma lobes are shorter than the awns.

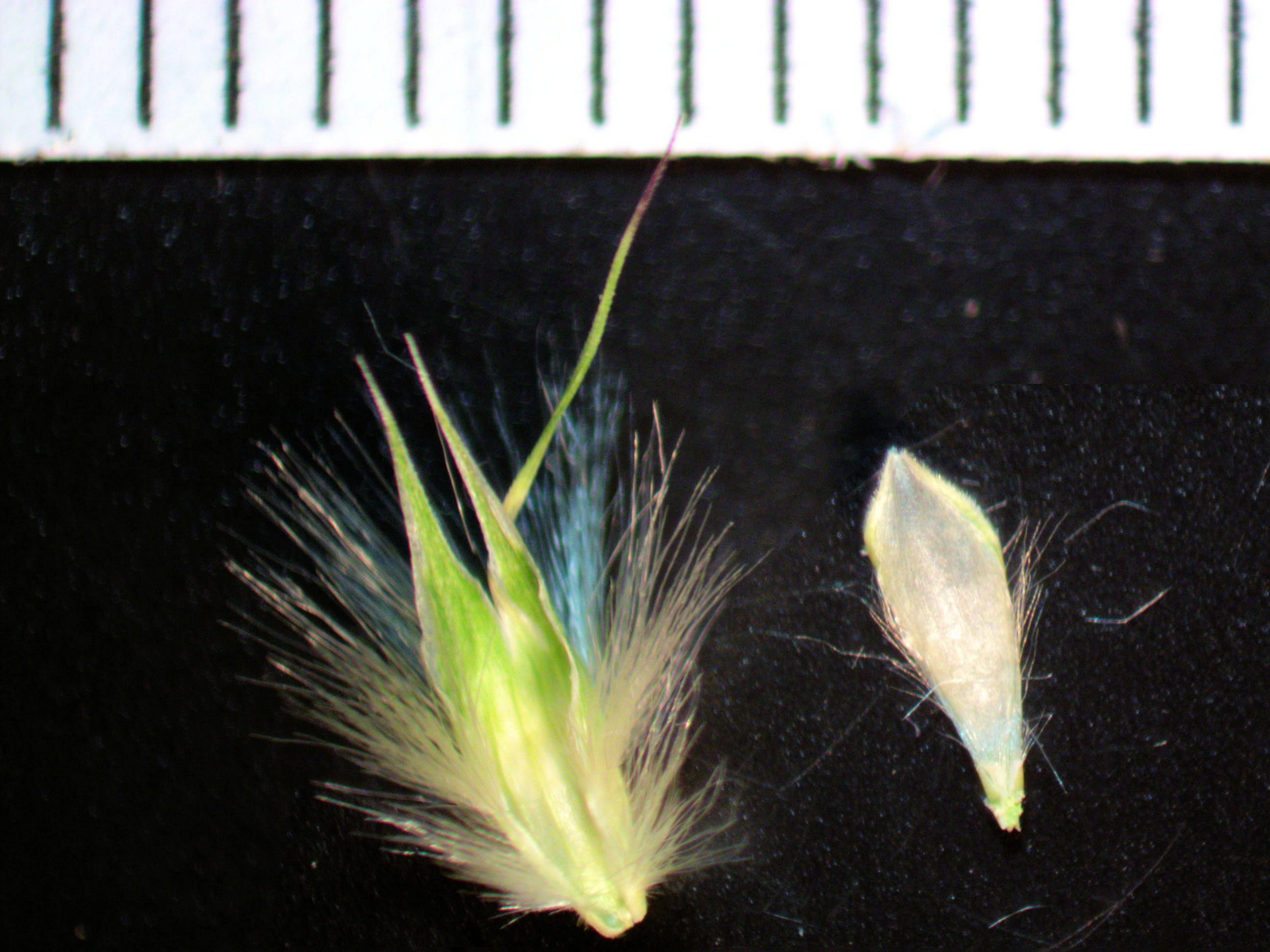
A single R. carphoides floret

=== Identification ===
As a Rytidosperma, the easiest way to identify R. buchananii is to select a single floret (which will contain a single awn, two lateral lobes, and usually three rows of hairs - one on the callus and two on the lemma). The arrangement of the hairs, as well as the relative lengths of the awn, lateral lobes, sometimes the callus can help identify to species, using a key such as that found in the New Zealand Flora.

=== Varieties ===
Rytidosperma carphoides has two varieties - var. carphoides, and var. angustius. The variety angustius (Vickery) Connor & Edgar is distinguished by its narrower glumes, longer, more tapered lateral lemma lobes, and 2–3 florets per spikelet. The variety is generally not accepted, because there is continuous variation between it and the nominate variety.

=== Cytology ===
Rytidosperma carphoides has 2n = 24 chromosomes.

== Distribution ==
Rytidosperma carphoides is native to Australia and introduced and naturalised in New Zealand.

In Australia, R. carphoides is found in New South Wales, South Australia, Tasmania, and Victoria.

Rytidosperma carphoides is known in New Zealand from Marlborough and Christchurch. It was first recorded as naturalised in New Zealand in 1946 from Wither Hills near Blenheim, but was originally thought to be R. geniculatum. In 1983 a specimen was found in the Port Hills of Christchurch. From 2013, New Zealand specimens were recognised as R. carphoides, matching the variety angustius.

== Habitat ==
In Australia, R. carphoides is described as growing at 680–800m above-sea-level in "sclerophyllous scrub and eucalypt woodlands, grassy hillsides, in heavy soils". It is frequently common where grass is cut by grazing or mowing, but not common in lank grass. In Victoria, it is described as growing on the basalt plains, as well as alluvium and shallow soils.

In New Zealand, R. carphoides is described as growing in dry, rocky grassland. One site in described as a northeast-facing slope; in a patch of rocky ground, browned off with Festuca bromoides.

== Ecology ==
Rytidosperma carphoides flowers from October to February, and goes to seed from October to August.

Rytidosperma carphoides is a food species for the golden sun moth (Synemon plana). It is apparently favoured by sheep.

== Taxonomy ==
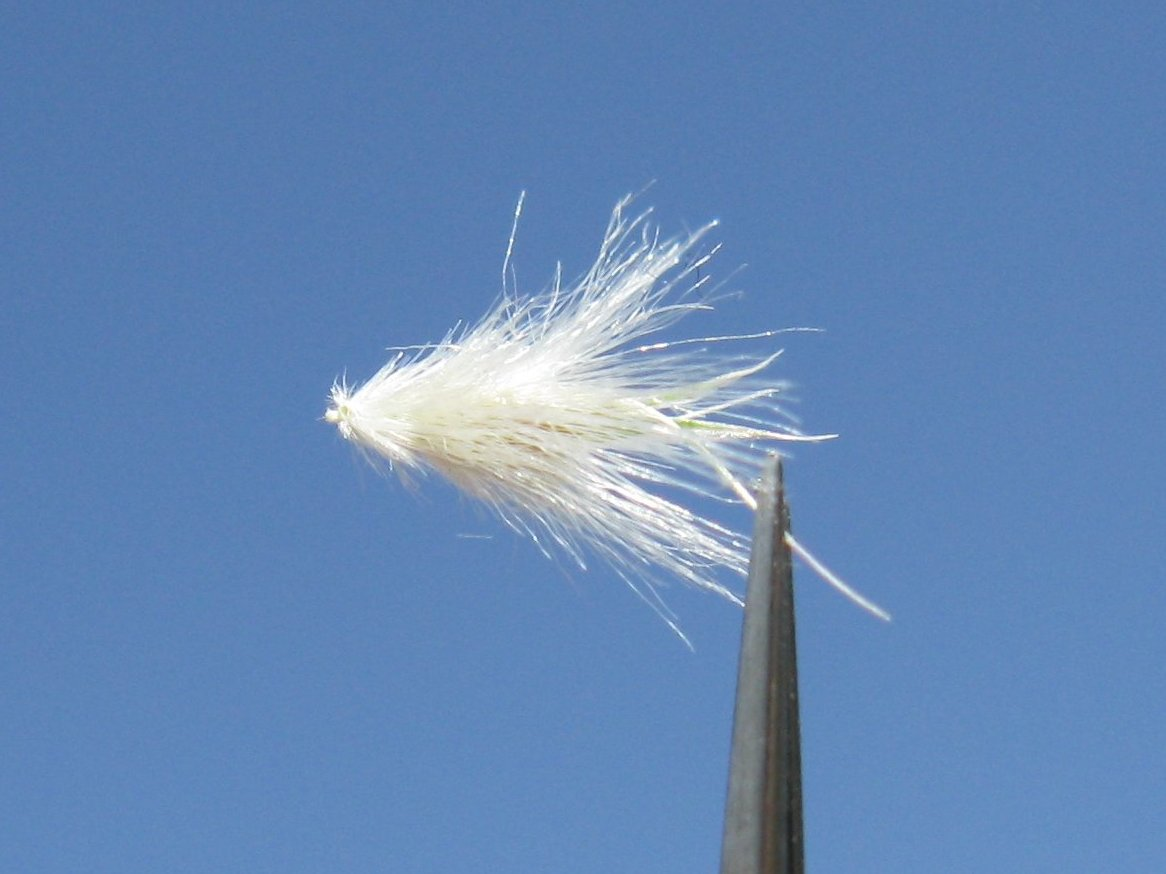
Lemma hairs

Rytidosperma carphoides was initially described as Danthonia viridis in 1878 by Austrian-German botanist Ferdinand von Mueller. It was then moved to Notodanthonia by Zotov in 1963. The genus Notodanthonia was synonymised with Rytidosperma in Nicora (1973), after it was recognised that they referred to the same group. The genus Notodanthonia was only described in 1963 by Zotov, whereas Rytidosperma was described in 1854 by Steudel. As such, the older name Rytidosperma took priority under the International Code of Nomenclature. Aotearoa/New Zealand species were formally moved to Rytidosperma in 1979, following this view.

=== Etymology ===
Rytidosperma: 'wrinkled seed' from the Greek 'rhytidos' = wrinkled and 'sperma' = seed

carphoides: 'Carpha-like' from Carpha (a kind of sedge); -oides (like).
