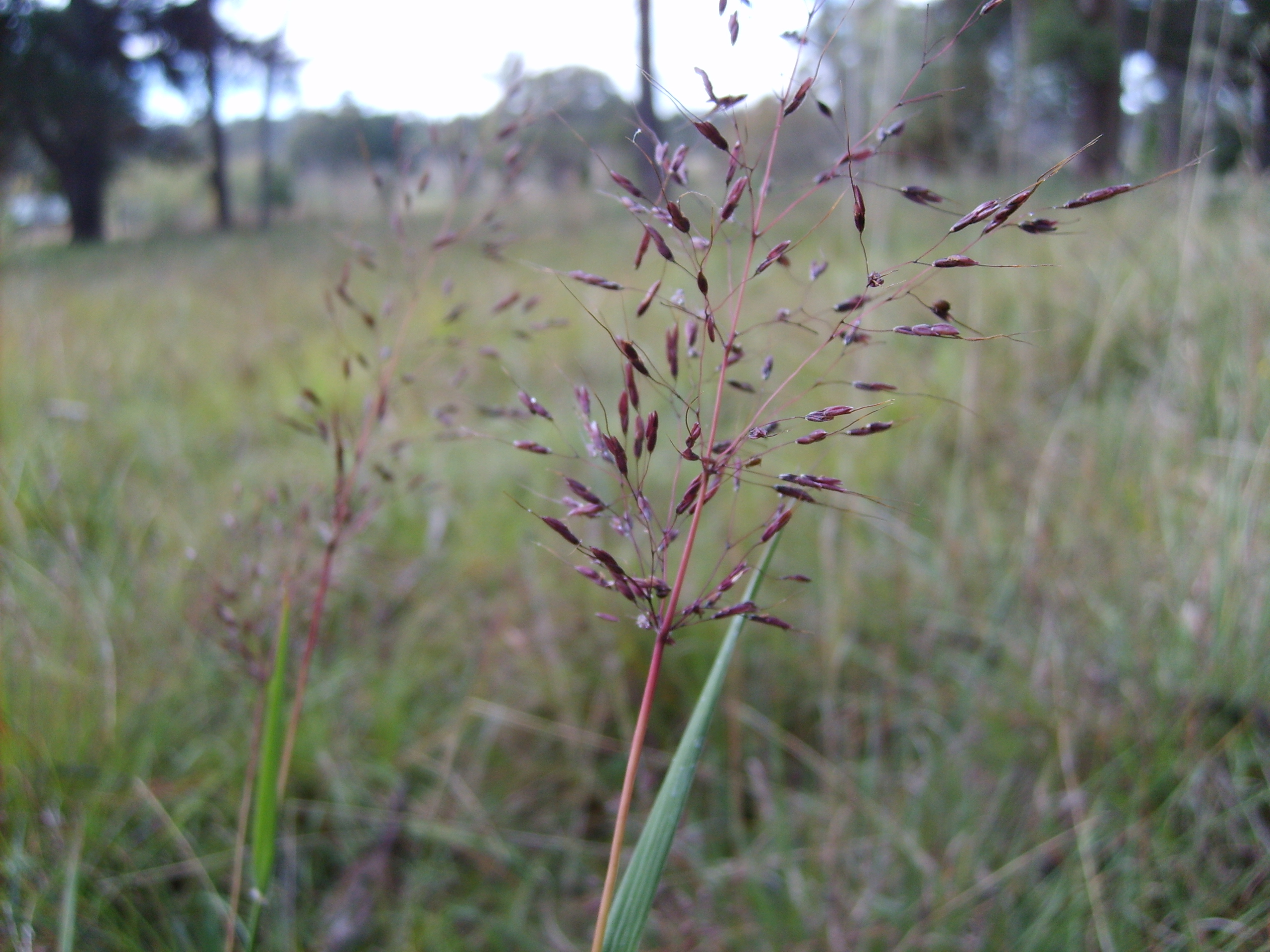
- Capillipedium parviflorum

Scientific classification
- Kingdom: Plantae
- Clade: Tracheophytes
- Clade: Angiosperms
- Clade: Monocots
- Clade: Commelinids
- Order: Poales
- Family: Poaceae
- Subfamily: Panicoideae
- Supertribe: Andropogonodae
- Tribe: Andropogoneae
- Subtribe: Andropogoninae
- Genus: Capillipedium; Stapf

Type species
- Capillipedium parviflorum (R.Br.) Stapf

Synonyms
- Filipedium Raizada & S.K.Jain

= Capillipedium =

Genus of grasses

Capillipedium (common name scented-tops) is a genus of plants in the grass family. They are native to Africa, Asia, Australia, and certain islands in the Western Pacific.

Capillipedium mistryi is an exception in the genus from India in which solid instead of translucent pedicels are seen and spikelets are multispiculated, racemes comprising up to 25 spikelets. A recently described species, C. yashwantraoi, from Madhya Pradesh, India has been subsumed under the former as a new heterotypic synonym.

Species

- Capillipedium annamense - Thailand, Vietnam
- Capillipedium assimile - China, Ryukyu Is, SE Asia, Indian Subcon
- Capillipedium duongii - Vietnam
- Capillipedium filiculme - India
- Capillipedium huegelii - Indian Subcon, Myanmar
- Capillipedium kuoi - Sichuan, Yunnan, Tibet
- Capillipedium kwashotense - Taiwan, Iriomote-jima
- Capillipedium laoticum - Laos, Thailand, Vietnam
- Capillipedium leucotrichum - Laos, Cambodia
- Capillipedium longisetosum - Thailand
- Capillipedium magdalenii - India
- Capillipedium mistryi
- Capillipedium nagense - Assam
- Capillipedium parviflorum - Africa (from Eritrea to Mpumalanga), Asia (from Oman to Japan + Sulawesi), Australia, Pacific Islands
- Capillipedium planipedicellatum - Assam
- Capillipedium pteropechys - Nagaland
- Capillipedium spicigerum - Japan, S China, Philippines, Lesser Sunda Is, New Guinea, Solomon Is, Australia, New Caledonia, Micronesia
- Capillipedium sulcatum - Thailand

formerly included

see Hemisorghum

- Capillipedium venustum - Hemisorghum venustum

== See also ==
- List of Poaceae genera
