= Rytidosperma australe =

Conservation status
- Not Threatened (NZ TCS)

Scientific classification
- Kingdom: Plantae
- Clade: Tracheophytes
- Clade: Angiosperms
- Clade: Monocots
- Clade: Commelinids
- Order: Poales
- Family: Poaceae
- Genus: Rytidosperma
- Species: R. australe

Binomial name
- Rytidosperma australe (Petrie) Connor & Edgar

Species of plant

Rytidosperma australe, also known as Southern sheepgrass and snowpatch grass is a species of true grass in the subfamily Danthonioideae. It was described as Triodia australis in 1889 by Scottish-New Zealand botanist Donald Petrie. It was previously believed to be endemic to New Zealand, but was identified in Australia for the first time in 1963 by Russian-New Zealand botanist Victor Zotov.

== Description ==
R. australe is a small, rhizomatous grass with short flat or folded leaves. The panicles are 0.5-2-(3.5) cm long, tipped with 3-4 flowered spikelets. The upper florets often exceed the glumes which are green to purple-tinged. The lemma is 1.5-1.8 mm, glabrous, or with a single pair of marginal hair tufts at the rachilla.

It has 2n = 24 chromosomes.

=== Identification ===
As a Rytidosperma, the easiest way to identify R. buchananii is to select a single floret (which will contain a single awn, two lateral lobes, and usually three rows of hairs - one on the callus and two on the lemma). The arrangement of the hairs, as well as the relative lengths of the awn, lateral lobes, sometimes the callus can help identify to species, using a key such as that found in the New Zealand Flora.

=== Similar species ===
R. australe is similar to other Rytidosperma species that used to be placed in Triodia, such as R. exiguum and R. pumilum, as well as more recently described species like R. telmaticum and R. horrens.

== Distribution ==
R. australe is indigenous to New Zealand and Australia. The undated holotype (WELT 40330!) was collected in Mount Ida Range, Maniatoto by Donald Petrie.

=== New Zealand ===
Found in the North Island, in the Raukumara, Ruahine and Tararua Ranges, and in the South Island from North-West Nelson and east of the main divide.

=== Australia ===
R. australe was first identified by Russian-New Zealand botanist Victor Zotov in Australia in 1963 from specimens collected in the Kosciuszko National Park area. It is now known to be found in New South Wales and Victoria within the Kosciuszko National Park, and in Tasmania. In Victoria, it is described as very rare, found only on the Bogong High Plains, near Mount Cope.

== Habitat ==
R. australe is montane to alpine in tussock grassland, herbfield, feldmark, usually in damp ground. It is often found in hollows where snow persists. In Victoria, it is known only from broad, wet, gravelly creek beds and margins.

== Ecology ==
R. australe grows with other alpine and montane species. In Victoria, it is found at some open sites in stream beds with Oreobolus pumilio and Deschampsia caespitosa as well as in Caltha herbland, associated with Carex gaudichaudiana and Sphagnum cristatum. In New South Wales, it is found within Oreobolus pumilio sedgeland, within which it and Isolepis aucklandicus can occasionally be codominant.

=== Host and herbivore ecology ===
R. australe is a host of Sphaerodothella danthoniae, a sac fungus that produces black, shiny leaf spots that occasionally coalesce into straight to irregular lines in the leaf surface of several species of Rytidosperma.

In his description of the grass, Donald Petrie described it as "a nutritious grass, much relished by sheep and horses, and usually closely cropped."

== Life history ==
The generation lengths of R. australe is estimated to be up to 100 years. Given that it spreads rhizomatously, forming a close turf, its longevity is potentially indefinite, with the age of clones limited by stochastic events such as landslip or erosion of the gravelly substrate by unseasonal storm or flood events.

Rytidosperma australe flowers in January.

== Threats ==
In Victoria, R. australe is Critically Endangered. It is known from three sites, all of which are within 2 kilometers of each other. It is suspected to have undergone significant historic decline, due to habitat degradation by stock. Cattle browsed palatable vegetation, trampled and pugged bogs, and initiated erosion of the substrates beneath Caltha herblands that R. australe lives in. They also increased the nutrient content of the soil with their faeces, resulting in exotic weed invasion. Farmers are no longer granted alpine grazing licenses in the Alpine National Park, and the habitat may have partially recovered. However, other exotic herbivores, including feral horses and Sambar deer have increased in density. Sambar browse Caltha and pug, rut, and wallow in herbfields, which continues to threaten them. In the longer term, climate change is likely to reduce the amount of snowmelt running into the streams, causing them to dry out. The frequency and intensity of fires is also likely to increase. This, and the drying of the streambeds is likely to increase the risk of competition by shrubs.

In New Zealand, R. horrens is designated as Not Threatened under the New Zealand Threat Classification System.

== Taxonomy ==
R. australe was originally described as Triodia australis in 1889 by Scottish-New Zealand botanist Donald Petrie. In 1943, it was moved to Danthonia by Victor Zotov (as D. petriei, because a taxon with the epithet australis already existed in Danthonia). In 1963, Zotov again moved it, along with R. pumilum, this time to Erythranthera.

In 1986, Clayton & Renvoize reviewed the grasses of the world, and chose to maintain Rytidosperma but to include in it Erythranthera and some African and New Guinean genera. Generally following this view, Henry Connor and Elizabeth Edgar chose to move New Zealand species to Rytidosperma in 1987, giving R. australe its present name.

=== Etymology ===
Rytidosperma: 'wrinkled seed' from the Greek 'rhytidos' = wrinkled and 'sperma' = seed

australe - Latin for of the south, referring to the species southern distribution.

== Gallery ==
R. australe inflorescence

R. australe in tussockland habitat

R. australe growing with Oreobolus

R. australe plant
