= Caltha scaposa =

Scientific classification
- Kingdom: Plantae
- Clade: Tracheophytes
- Clade: Angiosperms
- Clade: Eudicots
- Order: Ranunculales
- Family: Ranunculaceae
- Genus: Caltha
- Species: C. scaposa

Binomial name
- Caltha scaposa Hook.f. & Thomson, 1855

Synonyms
- C. gracilis

Species of flowering plant

Caltha scaposa is a low, perennial herb with one or two yellow hermaphrodite saucer-shaped flowers. This marsh-marigold species belongs to the buttercup family, grows in moist alpine fields and is native to the eastern Himalayas and the mountains on the eastern margin of the Tibetan highland.

== Description ==
Caltha scaposa has flowers on stems that grow on after flowering from 7 to 24 cm high, with a thick rootstock that branches into many main roots. Its leaves are in a rosette and consist of a leafstalk and a leaf blade. The leafstalk is up to 10 cm long, and has a narrow, membranous and about 2½ cm long sheath at the base. The leaf blade is long hart-shaped or sometimes kidney-shaped (1½-3½ x 1–3 cm), with a blunt tip and an entire, scalloped or tooth-bearing margin. Mostly there are several flowering stems in each plant, which sometimes carry one, small, leaflike stipule and usually one, rarely 2 flowers of about 2½ cm across. As all marsh-marigolds, it lacks petals, but the five to nine (most often six) sepals are petal-like, strikingly yellow, inverted egg-shaped with a blunt tip, 10-15 x 6–8 mm. There are between twenty and forty stamens with flattened yellow filaments that carry yellow pollen, and encircle between ten and twenty carpels which are linear-oblong and prolonged into the persistent style, topped by an oblique and curved stigma. After pollination, the carpels develop into follicles of about 10x3 mm on 1½-3 mm long stalks. They may contain three to six ovoid, black seeds. Flowering occurs between June and August.

=== Differences with related species ===
C. scaposa differs from C. palustris that co-occurs with it over its entire distribution area because it is much smaller (usually below 20 cm versus usually over 30 cm), leaves are much smaller (1–4 cm compared to 3–25 cm long), flowers are usually solitary (but sometimes with two) with twenty to forty stamens, on a stem that mostly is nude, but occasionally has one small stipule (in C. palustris flowers have fifty to one hundred twenty stamens and are usually with four to nine on a stem that has several stipules, although one or two flowers per stem sometimes occur). The most conclusive difference is the stipitate (stalked) follicles in C. scaposa which are sessile (seated) in C. palustris. The general hart- or kidney-shape of the leaves and the yolk yellow of the flowers are shared characters. C. natans is a floating species with leaves along the rooting stems and with white or pink flowers of less than 1½ cm. Caltha leptosepala that occurs in western North-America mostly has white flowers, and the rare yellow-flowered variety has lanceolate sepals.

== Distribution ==
This species grows in moist alpine meadows and marshy streamsides, in the Himalayas between 3800–4600 m, and in China 2800–4100 m high. It can be found in India (Uttar Pradesh, Sikkim and Arunachal Pradesh), Nepal, Bhutan, southeastern Tibet and China (southern Gansu, southern Qinghai, western Sichuan, northwestern Yunnan).

== Taxonomy ==
Caltha scaposa is most closely related to the common marsh-marigold C. palustris, with which it composes the Caltha-section.
