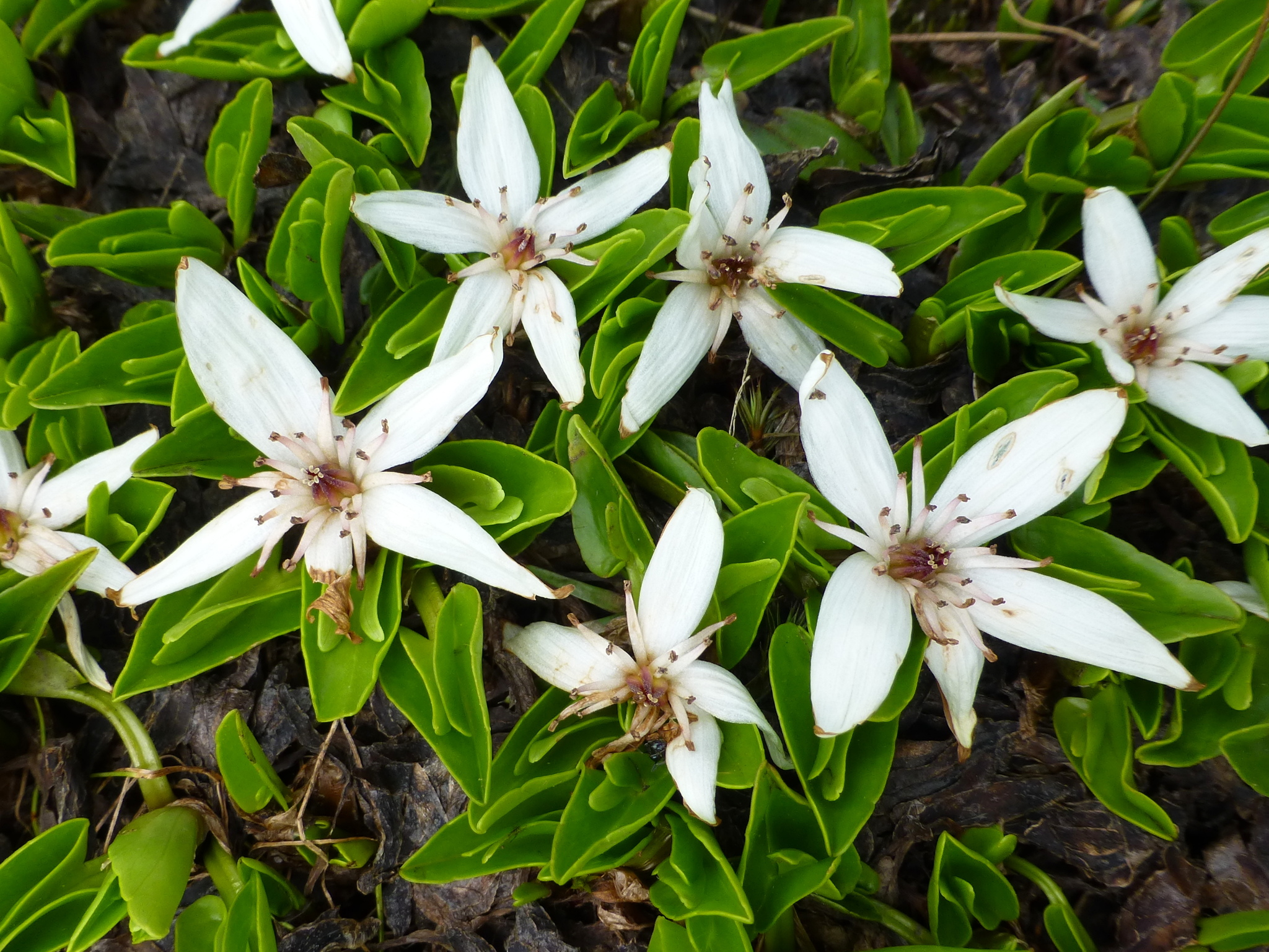

Scientific classification
- Kingdom: Plantae
- Clade: Tracheophytes
- Clade: Angiosperms
- Clade: Eudicots
- Order: Ranunculales
- Family: Ranunculaceae
- Genus: Caltha
- Species: C. introloba

Binomial name
- Caltha introloba F.Muell., 1855

Synonyms
- Psychrophila introloba; C. novae-zelandiae var. introloba; C. phylloptera

= Caltha introloba =

Species of flowering plant

Caltha introloba, commonly known as the alpine marsh-marigold is a small (during flowering 1–2 cm high) hairless, perennial alpine herb, that is endemic to the alpine regions of Australia and Tasmania.

== Description ==
The alpine marsh-marigold is a small hairless, perennial alpine herb, with short, stout rhizomes, and forms dense mats. Its leaves have petioles of about 5 cm long with a leaf blade that is oblong or lanceolate rounded triangular, 8–40 mm long, emarginate, with 2 lanceolate triangular appendages of 4–20 mm long on the upper surface. The flowering stem is 1–2 cm long, but grows to 5–10 cm when seeds are ripe. The five to eight sepals are between 10 and 22 mm long, white, but often tinged pink or purple, particularly at the base and the veins. Fifteen to thirty stamens with white or often pinkish filaments and yellow pollen encircle six to eighteen free carpels. When ripe, these have developed into follicles which are spreading, have short beaks and contain few seeds. Flowering occurs between November and December, often directly from under the receding snow.

== Distribution ==
Caltha introloba is known from Victoria, New South Wales and Tasmania where it grows in alpine fields. It occurs on the slopes of Mt Kosciusko and is locally common in spots with late-lying snow and between moss on the high ranges, such as Baw Baws, Snowy Range, Mt Buffalo, Bogong and Dargo High Plains. Usually flowering at edges of receding snow drifts.

== Ecology ==
Caltha introloba occurs in Victoria with Brachyscome tadgellii, Carex gaudichaudiana, Carpha nivicola, Drosera arcturi, Oreobolus distichus and Schoenus calyptratus. Flower buds start growing in the middle of the southern summer (January) and have fully developed when fresh snow no longer melts away in May. Mostly the flowers open after the October snow melt, and some flowers open under the snow cover if this persists unto mid-November. Seeds usually have completely developed at the end of summer (February). In an experiment, flower formation is triggered by long days and strong light. Another experiment showed that flowers will only open after a cold period, probably a mechanism to prevent premature opening in autumn. Seeds of Caltha introloba in another experiment were shown to germinate best between 22 and 27 °C, with a delay of 40–60 days, and hardly between 0 and 15 °C. However, after four months at 1–2 °C, germination below 15 °C was much faster and better. Seeds of C. introloba shed in the summer are thus unlikely to germinate before the snow melts in the following spring. Growth and photosynthesis are best around 15 °C, which is near the mean maximum temperature during summer in the alpine conditions this species is growing. Photosynthesis did also occur at 0 °C and the growing season probably includes the entire period the plants are not covered by snow.
