= Rytidosperma exiguum =

Scientific classification
- Kingdom: Plantae
- Clade: Tracheophytes
- Clade: Angiosperms
- Clade: Monocots
- Clade: Commelinids
- Order: Poales
- Family: Poaceae
- Genus: Rytidosperma
- Species: R. exiguum

Binomial name
- Rytidosperma exiguum (Kirk) H.P.Linder

Species of plant

Rytidosperma exiguum, also known as mountain twitch is a species of true grass in the subfamily Danthonioideae. It is endemic to New Zealand and was described as Triodia exigua in 1882 by English-New Zealand botanist Thomas Kirk.

== Distribution ==
R. exiguum is endemic to Aotearoa/New Zealand South Island. It is found in Canterbury, and was once found in northern Otago, but is now believed to be regionally extirpated there. In 2015, R. exiguum was reportedly found on the banks of the Clarence River in the Northern South Island, for the first time.

In Otago, it was reportedly 'not uncommon' in dry plains and river terraces at Kyeburn Crossing, St Bathans, Moa Flat, and Lake Hawea as of 1895. It is not known at any of these locations today.

=== Type ===
The lectotype was collected by Thomas Kirk by the Thomas River, Waimakariri, in February 1881.

== Description ==
Rytidosperma exiguum rhizomatous growth form

Rytidosperma exiguum floral morphology

R. exiguum grows in short tufts of slender, intravaginally branching shoots with stout, woody rhizomes, often covered in papery light brown leaf sheaths. The leaves are leaves hair-like, curved, and green or yellowy-green. The culm is erect, 2-7 cm tall, tipped with a reduced panicle inflorescence, often with just one, or sometimes more small, 2-3 flowered spikelets. The lemmas are short, awnless, light green, and covered in scattered short hairs. The palea is shorter than the lemma.

With its unusual woody, papery rhizomes, and its inflorescences often reduced to just one or two small, round spikelets, R. exiguum is quite unlike any other Rytidosperma, and unlikely to be confused. Due to this, it was placed in its own genus Pyrranthera for over thirty years, before it was recombined with Rytidosperma.

== Habitat and Ecology ==
R. exiguum is typically found in dry grasslands, often on river terraces and plains. In inland Canterbury, it is often pictured growing with other typical dry grassland species, such as Styphelia nana, Coprosma atropurpurea, and the exotic hawkweed, Pilosella officinarum. In lowland Canterbury, R. exiguum grows in floodplains associated with the Waimakariri River.

R. exiguum is a host of the fungus Stagonospora triodiae, which is named after the genus Triodia that R. exiguum used to be placed in. It is a data deficient species, which is found on dead leaves of its host. It has only been collected twice, from Broken River, Canterbury, and Kyeburn, Otago.

== Biology ==
R. exiguum reproduces largely through asexual reproduction - forming large turfs with its branching rhizomes.

R. exiguum has 156 chromosomes, making it a 26-ploid species. This is the second highest chromosome count in the grass family Poaceae, lower only than the Subantarctic New Zealand species Poa litorosa, which has c. 266 chromosomes, a 38-ploid genome.

== Threats ==
R. exiguum is classified as At Risk - Declining under the New Zealand Threat Classification System. The population size and trend are poorly known. It was previously classified as data deficient in 2013 and Not Threatened before then. It is believed to now be regionally extirpated from the Otago Region.

It is threatened by competition from exotic plants and habitat loss.

As early as 1895, Thomas Kirk noted that the species greatly declines in response to competition from exotic plants, such as perennial ryegrass (Lolium perenne) and blue meadow grass (Poa pratensis).

R. exiguum and other dry grassland plants occupied a much larger area in the past. It used to be abundant on the Waimakariri basin near Christchurch, growing in dryland communities associated with flood plains around the Waimakariri River. Much of this habitat is now irrigated and fertilised for higher productive grassland. Conserving the remaining landscapes today is complex. One of the most significant threats is the invasion of exotic grasses, particularly ryegrass, meadow grass, and fescue (Festuca rubra). In fenced plots at McLeans Island, native species have declined to essentially null. Outside of them, native species are present, but are steadily declining due to excessive grazing by sheep and rabbits. Thus, the only option to retain the species is to graze the areas at low intensity, while removing additional weedy exotic species.

== Taxonomy ==
In 1871, ten years prior to the description of the species, John Buchanan illustrated a specimen of R. exiguum collected at St. Bathans by Donald Petrie. However, Buchanan mistook it for the Australian Rytidosperma pauciflorum (then in Danthonia), which is not present in New Zealand. Following this, English-New Zealand botanist Thomas Kirk described the species for the first time in the genus Triodia as T. exigua, alongside Rytidosperma australis, R. pumilum, and R. thomsonii, which were all at time in Triodia. In the New Zealand Journal of Science, the two botanists went head to head (often with heated language), arguing for or against the species being included in Danthonia or Triodia. According to Buchanan, Triodia had three teeth on the lemma, but R. exiguum had two teeth and a small awn, whereas according to Kirk, the awn was actually a tooth. The botanical community, it seems, largely agreed with Kirk on both counts, that it was not R. pauciflorum, and that it was in Triodia.

In 1891, German botanist Otto Kuntze moved Triodia to Sieglingia, adding the synonym S. exigua, a move which does not appear to have been followed in New Zealand.

In 1943, Russian-New Zealand botanist Victor Zotov moved all of the New Zealand species in Triodia into Danthonia, and designated a lectotype. Following this, he described a new genus Pyrranthera for what was Triodia exigua, citing morphological differences between it and all other New Zealand Danthonia, which he moved into a new genus Notodanthonia.

In 1979, New Zealand botanists Henry Connor and Elizabeth Edgar moved all New Zealand species formerly included in Notodanthonia into a broad Southern Hemisphere genus Rytidosperma, which stretched across Australia, New Zealand, and Chile. However, they retained Pyrrhanthera, later citing differences in the lemma morphology (with Rytidosperma having hairs arranged in tufts, while Pyrrhanthera had hairs dispersed across the lemma) and cytology (with Pyrrhanthera having an unusually high chromosome count of 156 - a 26-ploid genome, the second highest in the grass family, much higher than the typical diploid and tetraploid Rytidosperma). Finally, in 1994, following the increasingly use of genetic sequencing in taxonomy, Australian botanist H.P. Linder published a paper finding that the genus Pyrrhanthera was entirely nested within the phylogenetic tree made up by Rytidosperma. As such, he formerly merged the genus into Rytidosperma, giving the species the name Rytidosperma exiguum.

=== Etymology ===
Rytidosperma: 'wrinkled seed' from the Greek 'rhytidos' = wrinkled and 'sperma' = seed

exiguum: from the Latin 'exiguus', meaning "a poor man" - referring to the diminutive size of the plant.
