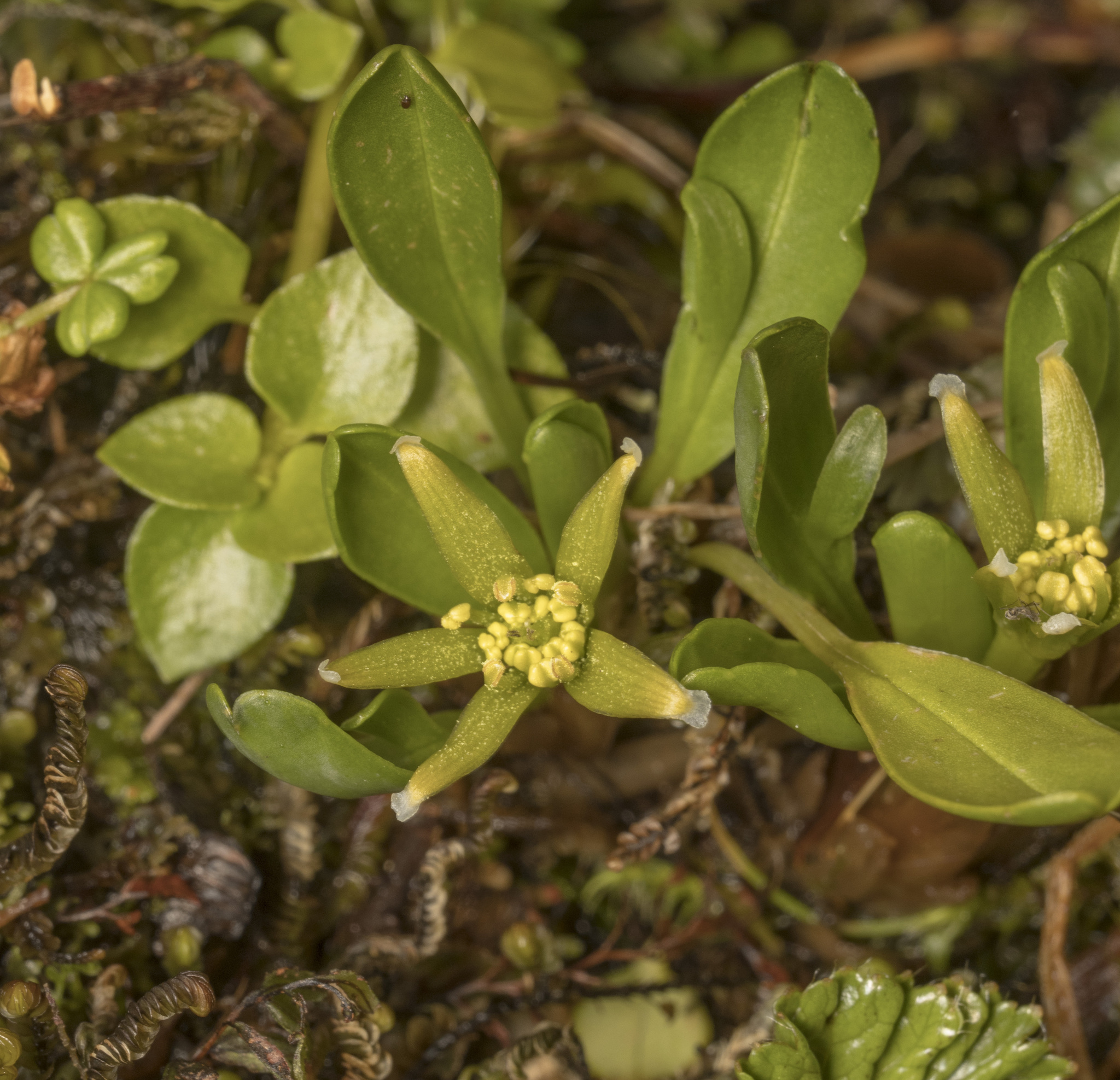

Scientific classification
- Kingdom: Plantae
- Clade: Embryophytes
- Clade: Tracheophytes
- Clade: Angiosperms
- Clade: Eudicots
- Order: Ranunculales
- Family: Ranunculaceae
- Genus: Caltha
- Species: C. appendiculata

Binomial name
- Caltha appendiculata Pers.

Synonyms
- C. appendiculata var. chilensis; C. limbata; C. paradoxa; C. holophylla; Psychrophila appendiculata; P. holophylla

= Caltha appendiculata =

Species of flowering plant

Caltha appendiculata is a perennial herb plant found in several countries of South America.

== Description ==
Caltha appendiculata is a low (2½-7 cm high) dioecious, perennial herb, often growing in dense clusters over considerable areas, with thick rhizomes. The strong stems are sparingly branched, somewhat elongated, and covered by the remains of old sheaths. Its thick and fleshy leaves consist of a short leafstalk and a blade of between six and ten mm long, which is ovate, elliptical or oblong in outline, has an entire margin or is split into three lobes, and usually is retuse at the tip. Near the midrib on the upward leaf face are two or three narrow leaflike outgrowths. This makes the leaf blade in its entirety reminiscent of an opened book. These appendages are in fact homologous with the ears at the base of the leaf blade of Northern Hemisphere Caltha species.

The faintly sweet scented actinomorphic solitary flowers of between one and two cm across have five spreading, lanceolate, pale yellow to creamy-green sepals with a purplish margin, and which are gradually narrowing towards the tip. Male flowers have thick, grooved peduncles. There are usually nine stamens. The five ovaries do not develop seeds. Female flowers have rudimentary staminodes, and five to nine compressed ovaries, with a papillose exterior. The carpels each contain up to seven or eight ovules, of which usually one or two develop into pale brown, shiny seeds. Flowers are present from late spring to summer. There are forty eight chromosomes (2n=48).

== Distribution ==
The species occurs on the Hermite Islands, the Falklands, Tierra del Fuego and the Southern Andes, in trickling melt water, marshes and other wet areas, from sea level up to about 2000 m.
