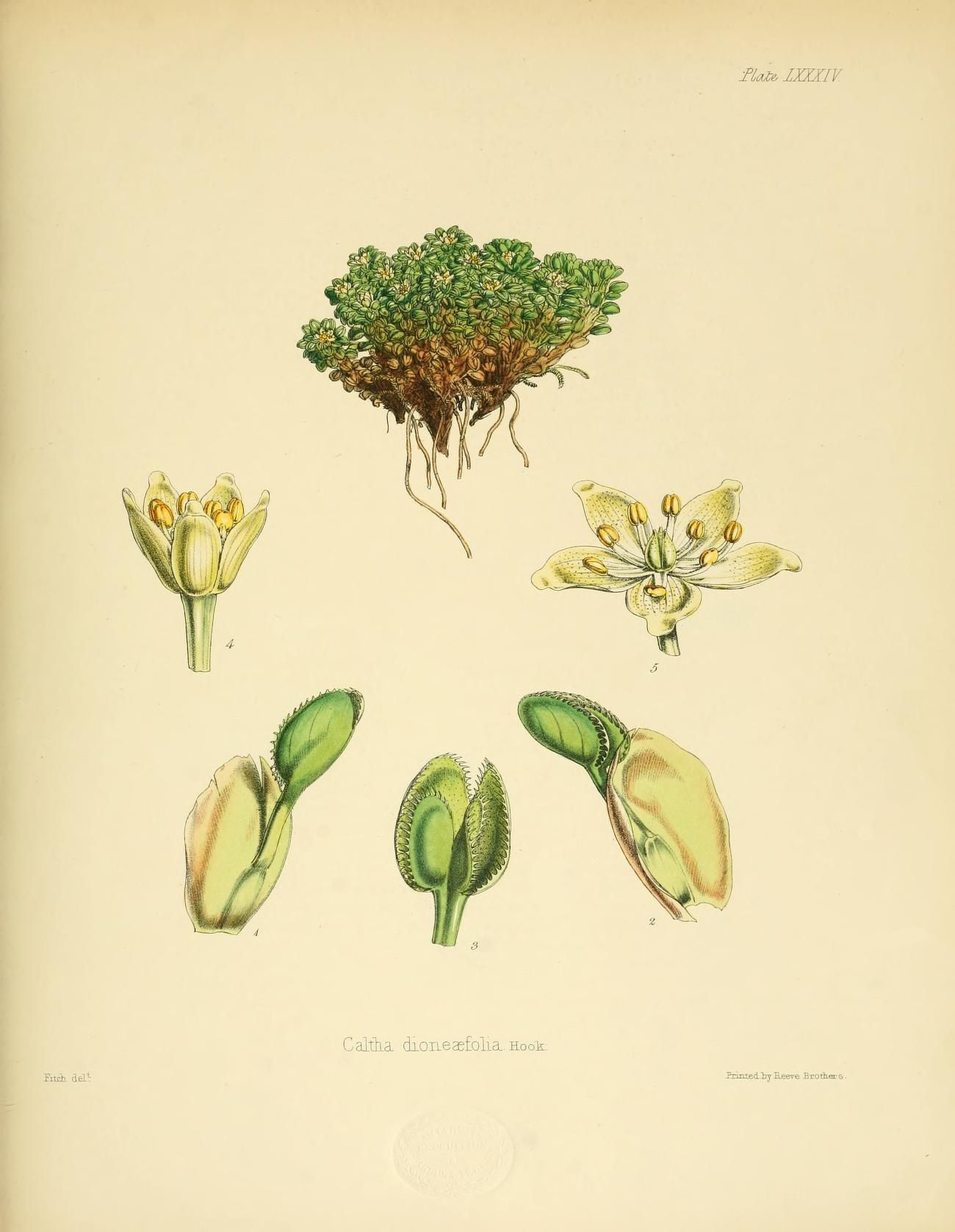
- Botanical illustration 1844
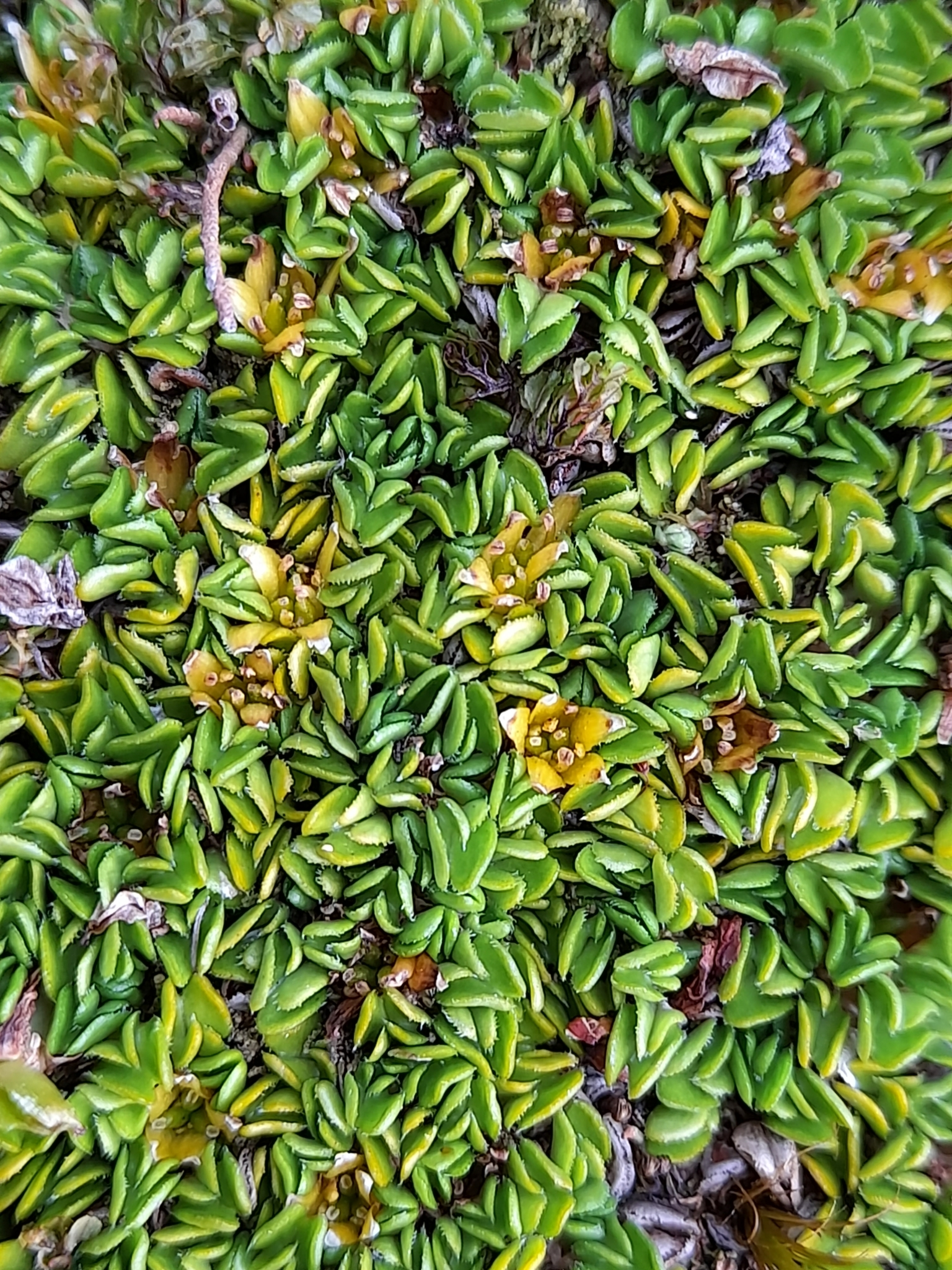

Scientific classification
- Kingdom: Plantae
- Clade: Tracheophytes
- Clade: Angiosperms
- Clade: Eudicots
- Order: Ranunculales
- Family: Ranunculaceae
- Genus: Caltha
- Species: C. dionaeifolia

Binomial name
- Caltha dionaeifolia Hook.f., 1843

= Caltha dionaeifolia =

Species of flowering plant

Caltha dioneaefolia is a dwarf perennial herb, of the Buttercup Family (Ranunculaceae) with apparently seated pale yellow flowers with about seven stamens and two to three free carpels and leaves that are reminiscent of those of the Venus flytrap, but very small and with leaflike appendages on the leaf. It occurs in the southern Andes of Chile and Argentina, including on Tierra del Fuego and Hermite Island.

== Description ==
Caltha dioneaefolia often grows in dense clusters over considerable areas, with thick rhizomes. The stems may be four to ten cm long and are densely branched. Its shiny, thick and fleshy leaves consist of a broad and long leafstalk, about half as wide and up to three times as long as the blade. The blade itself consists of two parts which are approximately identical in shape, but not in size. The larger, lower part is folded over its mid vein, about 1/2 cm long, ovate or almost circular, split into left and right lobes, and concave. The smaller, upper or inner part, which is often referred to as appendages, also consists of two ovate lobes of about 3 mm long. All four lobes have an entire margin which carries teeth-like hairs that are bent slightly inwards for the large lobes and outward for the small appendages. Each pair so resembles a trapleaf of the carnivorous Venus flytrap Dionaea muscipula. The leaf surface however harbors neither glands, nor trigger hairs, and hence C. dioneaefolia is not a carnivorous plant. The appendages are homologous with the ears at the base of the leafblade of Northern Hemisphere Caltha species. The purpose of the leaves' unusual structure is not presently known. The actinomorphic solitary flowers of about 1 cm across have five spreading, egg-shaped, yellow sepals, with about nine parallel veins on a short peduncle of about 1/2–1 cm, making it appear seated in the heart of the rosette of leaves. There are usually seven stamens. The two or three ovaries each contain two to five ovules. There are forty eight chromosomes (2n=48).

== Distribution and ecology ==
The species occurs in the Southern Andes. Bogs near the Strait of Magellan are densely coated by patches of C. dioneaefolia, Gaimardia and Astelia, that grow in between Sphagnum and other mosses.
