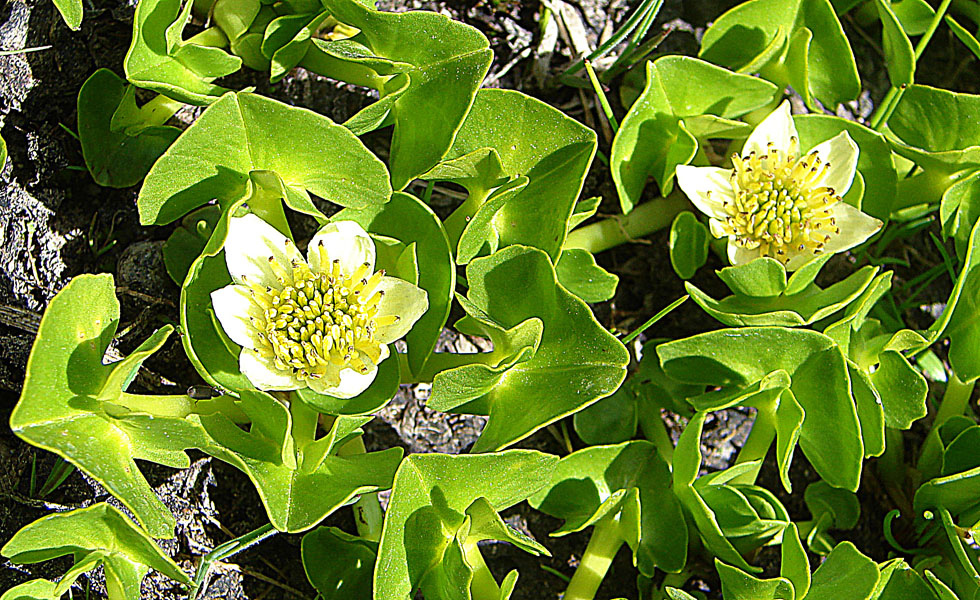

Scientific classification
- Kingdom: Plantae
- Clade: Tracheophytes
- Clade: Angiosperms
- Clade: Eudicots
- Order: Ranunculales
- Family: Ranunculaceae
- Genus: Caltha
- Species: C. sagittata

Binomial name
- Caltha sagittata Cav.

Synonyms
- C. alata; C. andicola; C. involuta; C. multicapsularis; C. deranco; C. sagittata var. latifolia; Psychrophila andicola; Psychrophila sagittata

= Caltha sagittata =

Species of flowering plant

Caltha sagittata is a low to medium height, rhizomatomous perennial herb with ivory (or pale yellow) hermaphrodite flowers, belonging to the Buttercup family. It grows in clusters in sunny wet places in the Andes and related mountain chains. It has a disjunct distribution concentrated in the Southern Cone of South America.

It is by far the most robust of the Southern Hemisphere Caltha species (section Psychrophila), and also the one with a distribution which extends furthest North.

== Description ==
C. sagittata has creeping rhizomes and eventually can form extensive clusters of plants that may, dependent on location, be up to 30 cm high. The petioles are 7–30 cm long and up to 7 mm wide. The blade of the leaf has a wide arrowhead (sagittate) shape with a retuse or blunt tip, and are between one and four cm long. Each leaf also has two basal lobes which extend as appendages that are about half as long as the main blade, and are almost free, except for a small bridge along the middle vein of the leaf. These appendages are often approximately at a right angle to the petiole. In some northern forms (sometimes regarded as a separate species, C. alata) however, the appendages are in the same plane as the remainder of the leaf blade. The solitary actinomorphic (radially symmetric) flowers of 3 cm or more across have five to eight spreading, ivory to pallid yellow, petal-like sepals of ½–1½ cm long and 2–8 mm wide, and a faint scent of honey. There are between thirty and seventy five stamens, with broad filaments.

C. sagittata is a variable species. It is often shy flowering.

== Distribution and Ecology ==
C. sagittata is found in Argentina (provinces of Chubut, Jujuy, La Rioja, Mendoza, Neuquen, Rio Negro, Santa Cruz, San Juan, Tierra del Fuego), Bolivia, Chile (Provinces of Coquimbo, O'Higgins, Maule, Bio Bio, Araucania, Los Lagos, Aisen, Magallanes, Reg. Metropolitana), Ecuador, Falklands, and Peru. It ranges from sea level in Tierra del Fuego to about 4000 m at the banks of Lake Titicaca. It grows in moist open grassland with other low herbs, on rill banks, snowmelt trickle and sometimes in brackish habitats.
