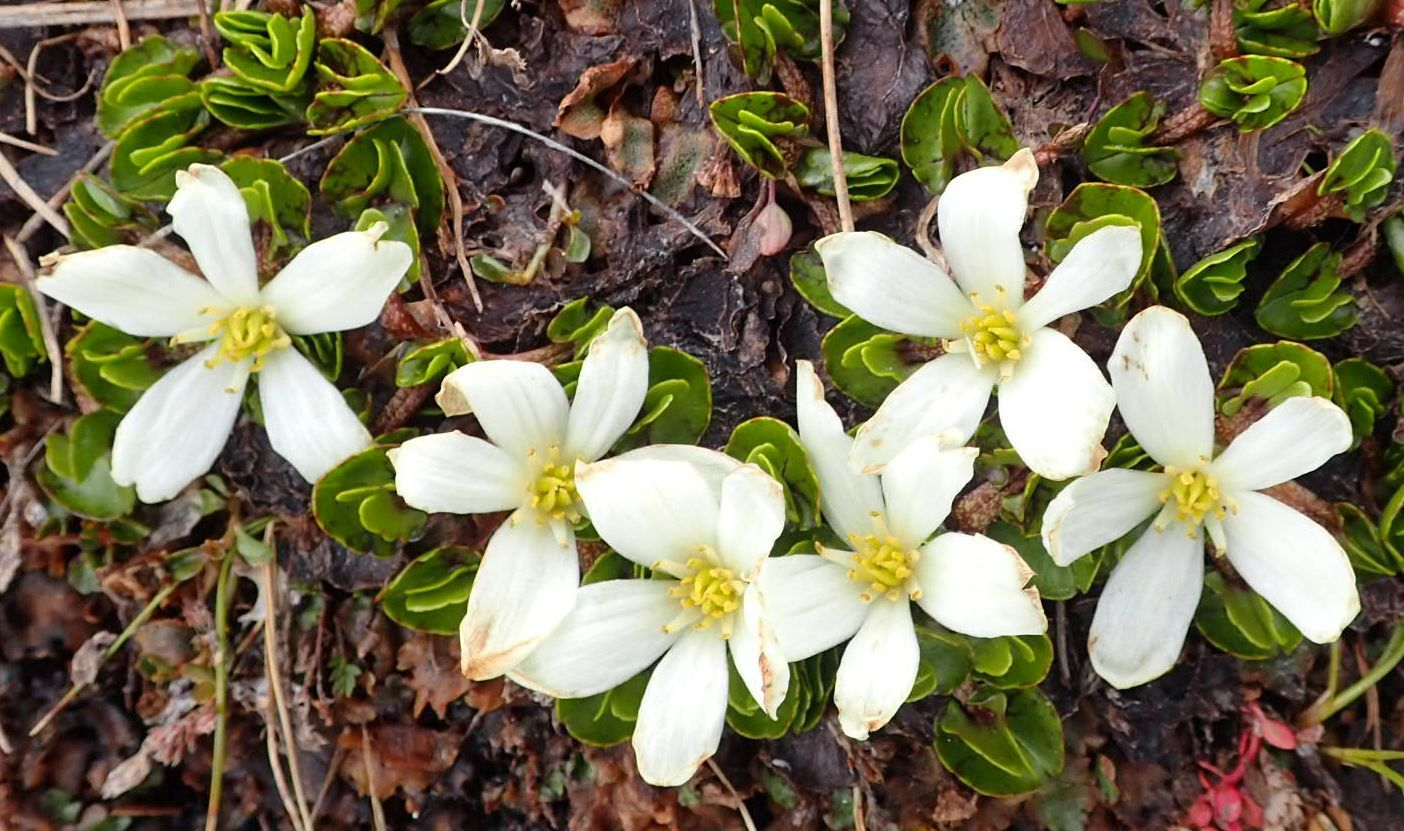
- C. obtusa in Gibston

Scientific classification
- Kingdom: Plantae
- Clade: Tracheophytes
- Clade: Angiosperms
- Clade: Eudicots
- Order: Ranunculales
- Family: Ranunculaceae
- Genus: Caltha
- Species: C. obtusa

Binomial name
- Caltha obtusa Cheeseman, 1901

Synonyms
- Caltha introloba var. obtusa; Psychrophila obtusa

= Caltha obtusa =

Species of flowering plant

Caltha obtusa; commonly known as white caltha; is a small (usually 2–6 cm), perennial herbaceous plant belonging to the family Ranunculaceae, that grows in open vegetations in mountainous areas, and is endemic to New Zealand's South Island.

== Etymology ==
The generic name Caltha has been derived from the Ancient Greek: κάλαθος (kalathos), means "goblet", and refers to the shape of the flower. The specific epithet obtusa is Latin and means "blunt".

== Distribution and ecology ==
The white caltha can be found in the mountains of New Zealand's South Island, from Canterbury southwards. It grows along alpine streams, seepages, around mountain lakes. It also occurs in moist open grasslands and wet places among gravel and herbs.

== Description ==
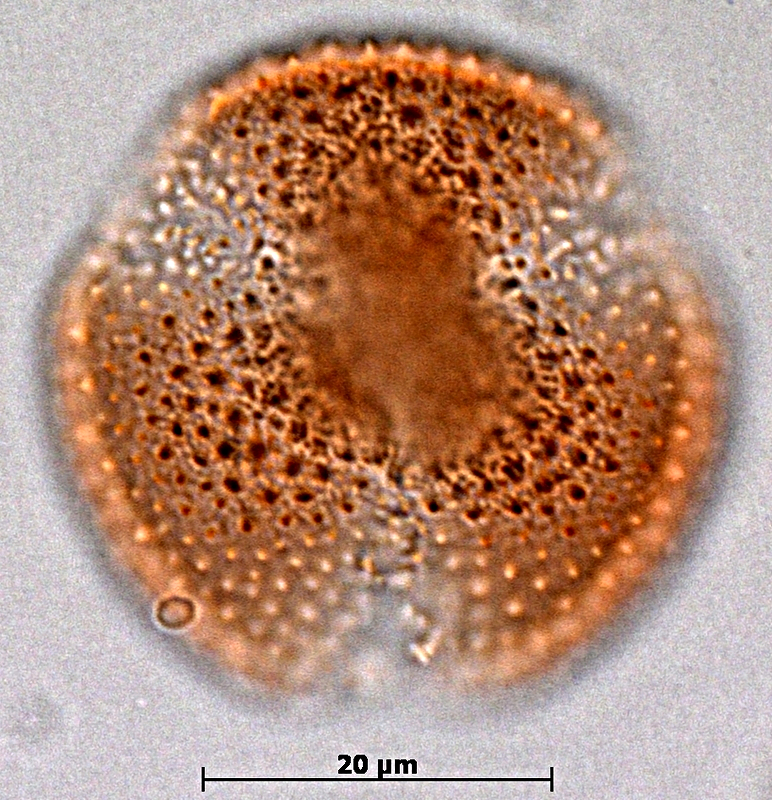
The tricolate pollen, polar view, showing the three characteristic slits

Caltha obtusa is a small (2–6 cm high), hairless, perennial herb. Plants form mats of rosettes. Its white rhizomes are stout and fleshy. The spade-shaped leaves have slender petioles of 8–12 mm long that form a membranous sheathing base. The leaf blade is dark green to yellowish green and sometimes with bronze blotches or streaks, are 8–12 × 7½-11 mm with two lobes at its base, with an indent at its tip and deeply scalloped edges, particularly near the base. The basal lobes (or appendages) are mostly pressed against the upper surface of the leaf, are more than half as long and also have a deeply scalloped outer margin. The five white sepals are 8–18 mm long and 6–12 mm wide, obovate, widest between the tip and the middle, and have an obtuse to acute tip. There are between ten and fifteen stamens encircling free narrow-ovate carpels each about 4–5 mm long and topped by a rather long and slender style. Flowers are said to smell like lemon. The fruiting heads are 12–18 mm across. Follicles reach 1¼-1½ cm in length. Seeds may ripen seldom. Flowering occurs between December and February, and fruits can be found from February until April. There are forty eight chromosomes (2n = 48).

== Differences from related species ==
Caltha obtusa differs from Caltha novae-zelandiae by the oblong-obovate white rather than linear pale yellow sepals, and by the leaf margins which are scalloped and almost lobed at the base rather than slightly scalloped to entire.
