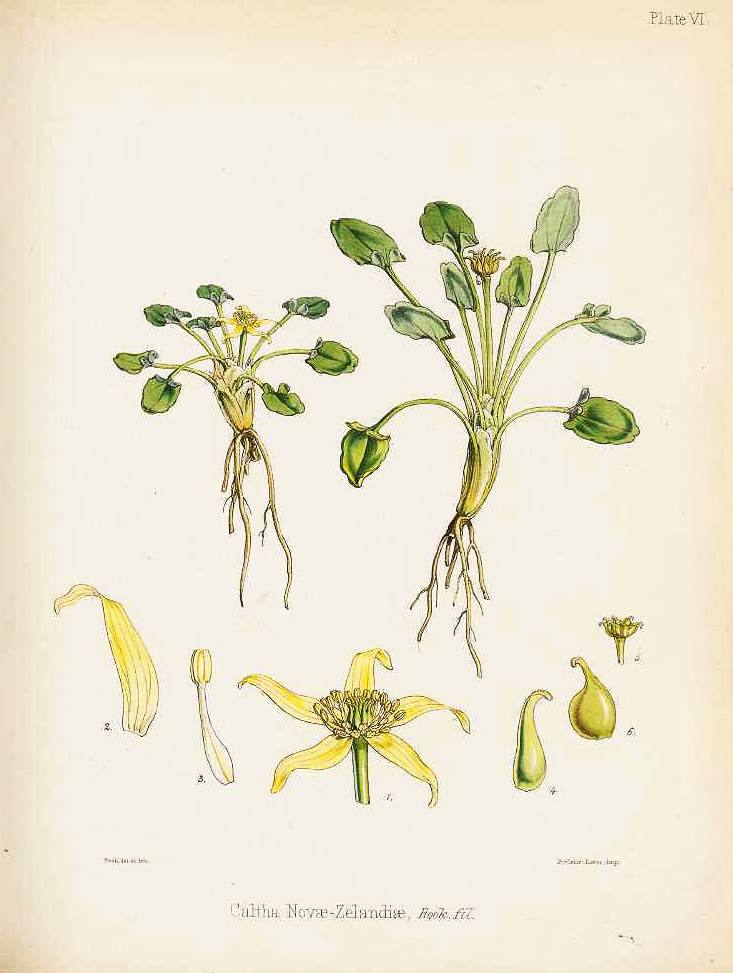
- plate VI, part 2, Flora Antarctica

Scientific classification
- Kingdom: Plantae
- Clade: Tracheophytes
- Clade: Angiosperms
- Clade: Eudicots
- Order: Ranunculales
- Family: Ranunculaceae
- Genus: Caltha
- Species: C. novae-zelandiae

Binomial name
- Caltha novae-zelandiae Hook.f.

Synonyms
- Psychrophila novae-zelandiae

= Caltha novae-zelandiae =

Species of flowering plant

Caltha novae-zelandiae, commonly known as New Zealand marsh marigold or yellow caltha, is a small (usually 3–5 cm), perennial herbaceous plant belonging to the family Ranunculaceae, that grows in open vegetations in mountainous areas, and is endemic to New Zealand.

== Etymology ==
The generic name Caltha has been derived from the Greek kalathos 'goblet', refers to the form of the flower. The specific epithet novae-zelandiae means of New Zealand.

== Distribution and ecology ==
The New Zealand marsh marigold can be found in the mountains of North, South and Stewart Islands from the main axial ranges of the North Island south. It grows in alpine flushes, seepages, around lakes and slow streaming rivulets. It is also present in moist areas in open grassland, among herbs or between gravel.

== Description ==
Caltha novae-zelandiae is a small (3–5 cm, exceptional up to 18 cm high), hairless, perennial herb. Plants form mats of rosettes. Its white rhizomes are stout and fleshy. The spade-shaped leaves have slender, grooved petioles of up to 10 cm long that form a membranous sheathing base. The leaf blade is dark green and sometimes has a central blotch or it has bronze markings, are 8-25 × 4–12 mm with two lobes at its base, with an indent at its tip and entire or slightly scalloped edges. The basal lobes (or appendages) are mostly pressed against the upper surface of the leaf and, almost half as long. The flower grows from an initially short peduncle, that continues to grow till it is finally up to 18 cm long during fruiting. The five to seven pale yellow sepals are 1–3 cm long and 2–3 mm wide, 3-nerved, linear-ovate, widest between the base and half length, and have an acute tip. There are between fifteen and twenty stamens encircling six to twelve ovate carpels each about 4–5 mm long and topped by a stout style of about 2 mm. The fruiting heads are 12–18 mm across. There are usually two to five seeds per follicle, each 1.2-2.0 mm long, glossy red-brown to dark purple brown, ovate to broadly ovate, or elliptic ovate. Flowering occurs between September and December, and ripe fruits can be found from December until March. There are forty eight chromosomes (2n = 48).

== Differences from related species ==
C. novae-zelandiae differs from Caltha obtusa by the linear yellow rather than oblong-obovate white sepals, and by the leaf margins which are slightly scalloped to entire rather than scalloped and almost lobed at the base.
