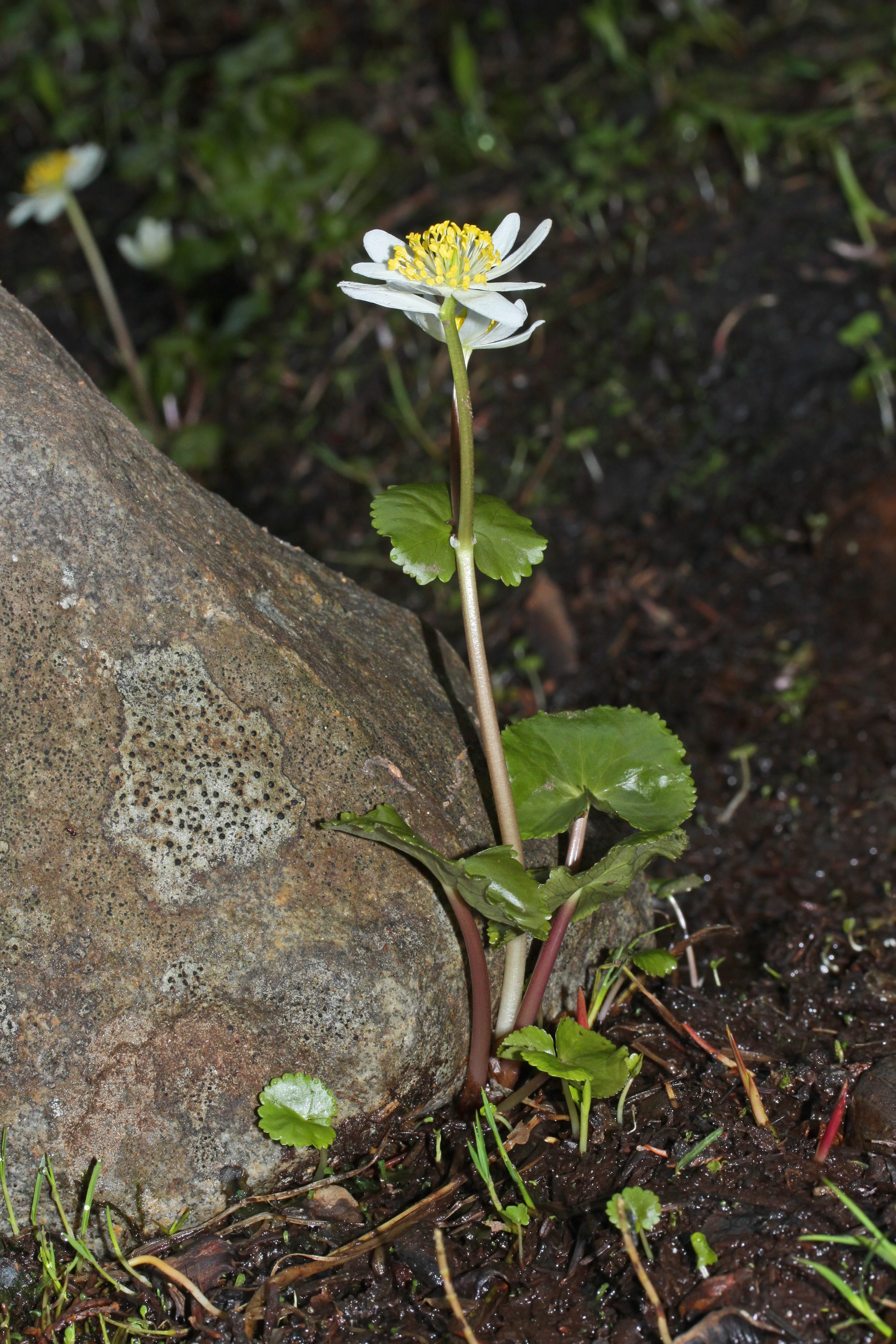
- Caltha leptosepala subsp. howellii

Conservation status
- Secure (NatureServe)

Scientific classification
- Kingdom: Plantae
- Clade: Tracheophytes
- Clade: Angiosperms
- Clade: Eudicots
- Order: Ranunculales
- Family: Ranunculaceae
- Genus: Caltha
- Species: C. leptosepala

Binomial name
- Caltha leptosepala DC.

Subspecies and varieties
- C. leptosepala ssp. leptosepala var. leptosepala; C. leptosepala ssp. leptosepala var. sulfurea Hitchcock; C. leptosepala subsp. howellii (Huth.) Smit

Synonyms
- C. lasopetala, C. leptostachya, C. chelidonii, C. uniflora

= Caltha leptosepala =

Species of flowering plant

Caltha leptosepala, the white marsh marigold, twinflowered marsh marigold, or broadleaved marsh marigold, is a North American species of flowering plant in the buttercup family. The species has regionally distinct variations.

== Description ==
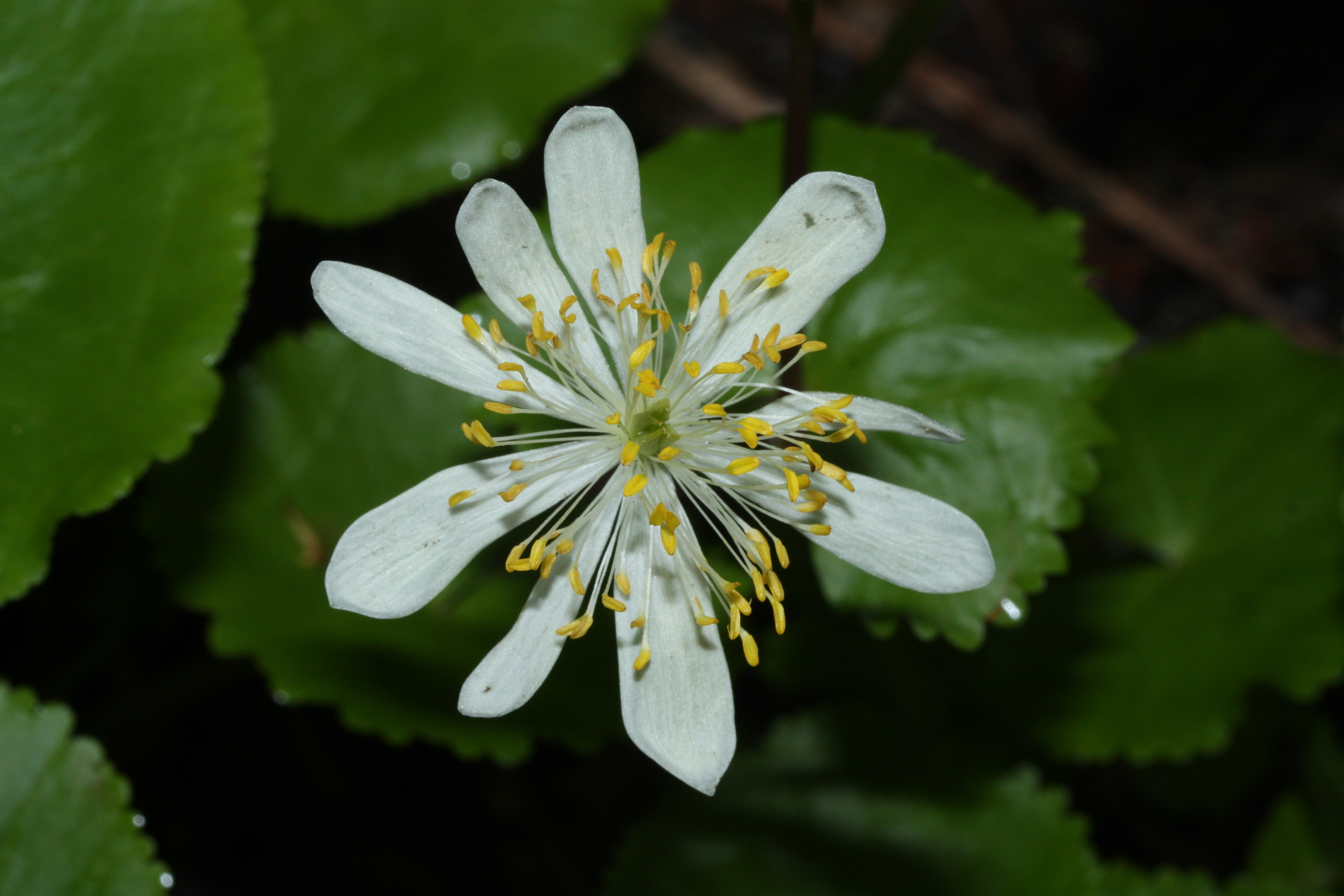
Caltha leptosepala subsp. howellii

This is a perennial herb growing a mostly naked stem with leaves located basally. The leaves are up to 13 or 15 centimetres (5 or 6 inches) long and may have smooth, wrinkled, or toothed edges. The inflorescence bears one or more flowers. Each flower is 1 to 4 cm (1/2 to 1 1/2 in) wide and lacks petals, having instead petallike sepals which are usually white but sometimes yellow. In the center are many long, flat stamens and fewer pistils.

== Taxonomy ==
Caltha leptosepala used to be assigned to the Populago (now Caltha) section with all other Northern Hemisphere species, but genetic analysis suggests that it is the sister of all Southern Hemisphere species and should be moved into the Psychrophila section.

C. leptosepala has two distinct subspecies (one of which has its own varieties). (Note: Specimens in the north of the species' range have a mixture of distinguishing traits, so cannot be further classified.)

- ssp. howellii has one or two flowers with oblong-ovate white sepals. The kidney-shaped leaves of up to 15 cm (5.9 in) long have an obtuse tip and basal lobes touching or overlapping. Pollen is pantoporate or sometimes pantocolpate (microscope). It grows in open, marshy vegetation in the Sierra Nevada and the Cascade Range in California, western Nevada, Oregon, western Washington, and on Vancouver Island.
- ssp. leptosepala var. leptosepala has one, exceptionally two flowers with white, linear-oblong sepals. The leaves are ovate heart-shaped, up to 7 cm (2.8 in) long, have an obtuse to acuminate tip and basal lobes that do not touch. The pollen is tricolpate. It can be found in open marshy alpine and subalpine places in the Rocky Mountains of northeastern Arizona, Colorado, southeastern Idaho, southern Montana, northeastern Nevada, Utah and Wyoming.
- ssp. leptosepala var. sulphurea is identical to the nominate variety but has yellow sepals. It occurs in wet alpine and subalpine meadows in the Rocky Mountains of Montana and Idaho.

An additional type found in the Pacific Coast Ranges is treated as Caltha biflora.

== Distribution and habitat ==
C. leptosepala is native to western North America from Alaska to New Mexico, where it grows in wet mountain habitats in alpine and subalpine regions.

It grows in moist to wet soils in partial shade. Its native habitats include wet alpine, subalpine meadows, stream edges and bogs.

== Toxicity ==
The leaves contain toxic alkaloids, but are eaten by elk nonetheless.

== Uses ==
The leaves and flower buds were eaten by some of the indigenous peoples of Alaska.
