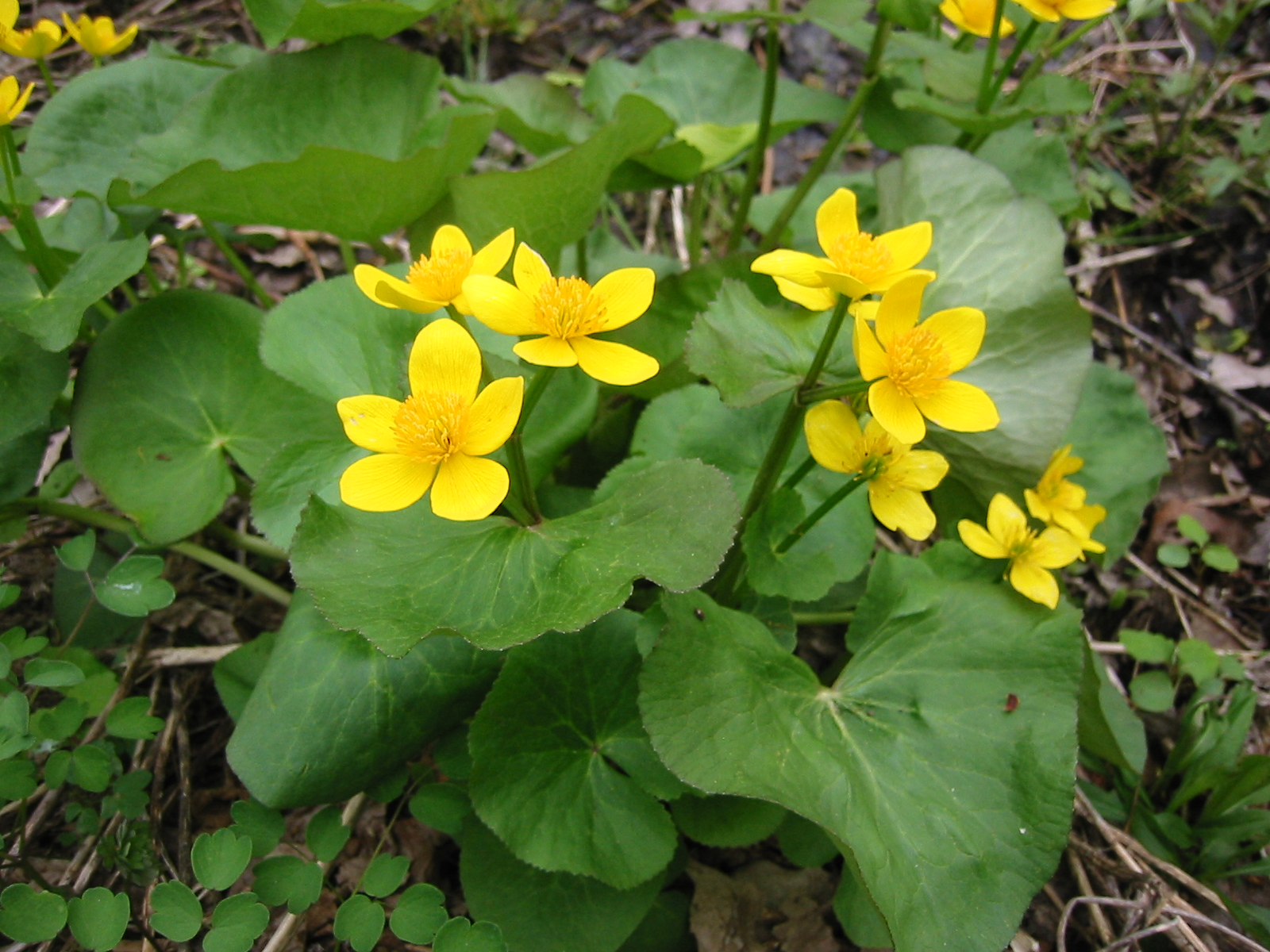
- Caltha palustris ↑habit, ↓seeds
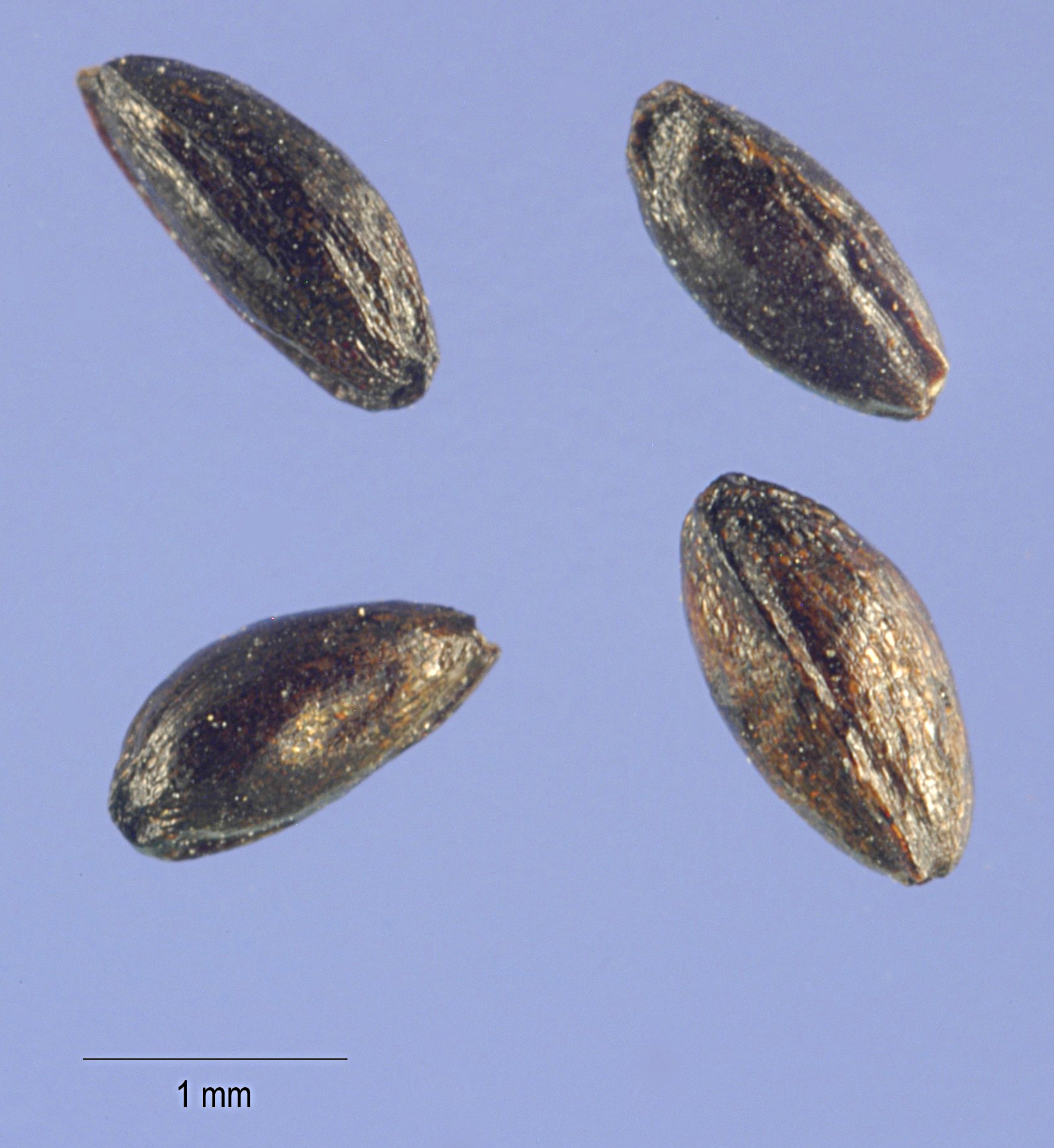

Scientific classification
- Kingdom: Plantae
- Clade: Tracheophytes
- Clade: Angiosperms
- Clade: Eudicots
- Order: Ranunculales
- Family: Ranunculaceae
- Subfamily: Ranunculoideae
- Tribe: Caltheae
- Genus: Caltha; L.

Type species
- Caltha palustris L.

Synonyms
- Thacla Spach; Psychrophila DC

= Caltha =

Genus of flowering plants

Caltha is a genus of rhizomatous perennial flowering plants in the family Ranunculaceae ("buttercup family"), to which ten species have been assigned. They occur in moist environments in temperate and cold regions of both the Northern and Southern Hemispheres. Their leaves are generally heart-shaped or kidney-shaped, or are characteristically diplophyllous (the auricles of the leaf blades form distinctly inflexed appendages). Flowers are star shaped and mostly yellow to white. True petals and nectaries are missing but the five or more sepals are distinctly colored. As usual in the buttercup family there is a circle of stamens around (two to twenty-five) free carpels.

== Description ==
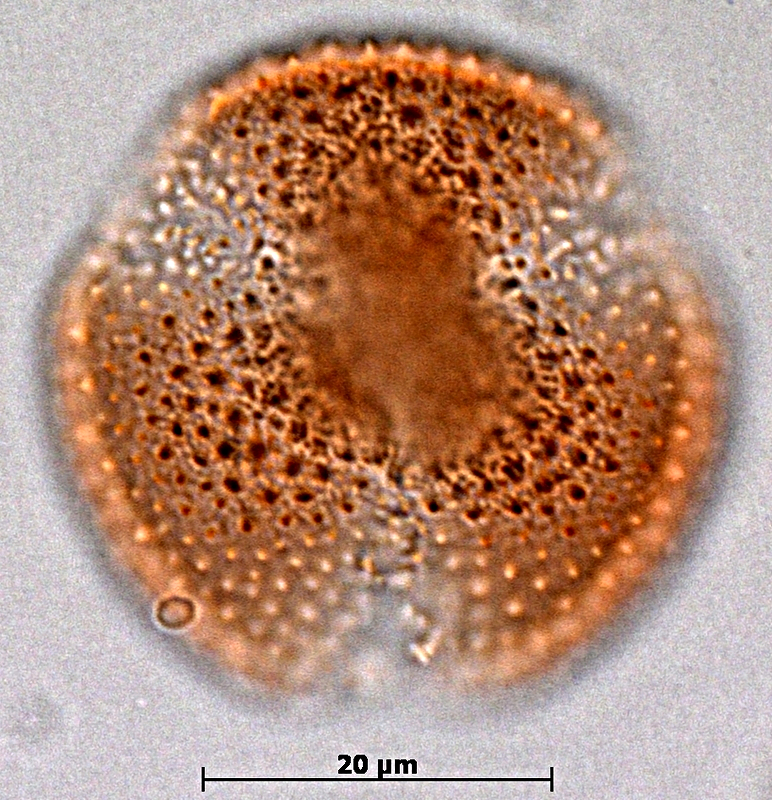
Tricolpate pollen of Caltha obtusa, polar view, showing the three characteristic slits

Caltha species are hairless, dwarf to medium size (1–80 cm high) perennial herbs, with alternate leaves. These leaves are simple (in all Northern Hemisphere species), or have one pair of lobes at the base (in C. sagittata) which is mostly oriented at a straight angle to the larger top lobe but is sometimes in the same plane (in some of its northern populations), or the basal lobes are merged with the top lobe to form two (occasionally three) appendages (in all remaining species) which are attached next to the midvein, with the adaxial surfaces of top lobe and appendages facing each other. This condition of the Southern Hemisphere species is referred to as diplophylly. All species have stalked basal leaves, and some also have one or few leaves on the flowerstalk. The flowers are single on a short stalk in the middle of the rosette of basal leaves (Southern Hemisphere species) or in a mostly few-flowered corymb, without or with one or few mostly sessile leaflike stipules. Northern Hemisphere species have kidney to (elongated) heart-shaped leaves and stipules, with simple toothed or scalloped margins. Southern Hemisphere species have a variety of leaf shapes. In C. appendiculata, the top lobe is regularly more or less trifid, with an indent at the tip of each segment, but it is also often spoon-shaped with an entire margin with a more or less retuse tip. The top lobe in C. dionaeifolia is split into ovate left and right halves, which are distinctly folded towards each other (plicate), and have a concave upper surface, an entire margin with toothlike hairs regularly spaced around its margins while the appendages are similar in shape but 1/2–2/3× as large. C. sagittata has wide arrowhead-shaped leaves with an entire margin and appendages triangular and about 2/3× as large, C. intriloba has narrow arrowhead-shaped to elongate ovate leaves with a slightly scalloped margin, with lanceolate-triangular appendages 2/3× as long. C. novae-zelandiae has spade-shaped leaves a bit longer than wide with a round and slightly retuse top and a slightly scalloped margin with appendages half as long, triangular with a blunt tip. Finally C. obtusa also has spade-shaped leaves, with a round and slightly retuse top, but these are about as wide as long and are distinctly scalloped particularly towards the base, and appendages about 3/4× as long with a likewise scalloped outer margin and a straight entire inner margin. The actinomorphic flowers lack true petals and nectaries, but the five to nine (sometimes as little as four or as much as thirteen) sepals are distinctly colored yellow (rarely orange or red) to white (sometimes tinged pink or magenta). The shape of the sepals varies between broadly ovate, obtuse, oblong to lanceolate. The number of stamens range between 6–9 in the smallest species (C. dionaeifolia) and 60–120 in the largest (C. palustris) and likewise does the number of carpels range between 2–5 and 5–25. Stamens encircle the carpels and both are planted on a flat floral base. The pollen is yellow and tricolpate except in C. leptosepala ssp. howellii that has pollen with rounded apertures all over the surface (pantoporate) or an intermediate type (pantocolporate), and in C. palustris var. alba, that shows both pollen types. Each carpel contains several ovules set along the ventral suture. These mostly develop into sessile follicles, with elliptic to globular light brown to black seeds without wings, dependent on the species between 0.5 and 1.5 mm. In C. scaposa follicles are stipitate and in C. leptosepala short stipitate to sessile. C. natans grows floating in fresh waters or on mud, but all other species are terrestrials that grow in moist soils.

== Key to the species ==
This key makes use of the taxonomic opinions and characters described in Smit (1973).

1	Leaves with leaflike appendages on the upper face of the leaves, or arrowhead-shaped with the basal portion mostly folded over the rest of the leaf. Flowers always solitary on short leafless peduncles. Pollen always tricolpate (microscope). In C. novae-zelandiae some plants lack appendages, but these are plants up to about 10 cm with spade-shaped leaves. → 2
-	Leaves kidney- to elongated heart-shaped, never with leaflike appendages. Flowers solitary on longer stems or in a corymb, either or not with leafy stipules. Pollen tricolpate, pantocolpate or pantoporate. Plants usually over 10 cm. → 7
2	Appendages merged with the upper surface of the leaf. Leaves long triangular, spade- or spoon-shaped, or divided into two or three lobes. Plants usually 1–12 cm high, in one species occasionally up to 20 cm. → 3
-	Basal portion at an angle with the rest of the short arrowhead-shaped leaf or rarely in the same plain. Hermaphrodite flower with five to seven ivory sepals, becoming yellowish green later. The plant is usually 10–30 cm in height. Grows in moist open places in Argentina, Bolivia, Chile, Ecuador, the Falklands, and Peru. → Caltha sagittata
3	Leaves long triangular, spade- or spoon-shaped, or divided into three lobes. → 4
-	Leaves divided into an ovate left and right lobe with an entire margin except for toothlike hairs, reminiscent of the leaf of the Venus flytrap. The appendages are identical in shape to the rest of the leaf but smaller. From the top, the sides of the leaf lobes and appendages are in the same horizontal plain. The hermaphrodite flower is greenish yellow, with five to seven dull greenish yellow sepals with a membraneous tip, later on veins and tip becoming dull purplish. Dwarf species of 1–3 cm high. Occurs in wet grassland in southern Argentina and Chile between 50°S and 56°S, including on the Hermite Islands and Cape Horn. → Caltha dionaeifolia
4	Leaves long triangular or spade-shaped. Flowers hermaphrodite. → 5
-	Leaves spoon-shaped with an entire margin and an indented tip, or divided into three lobes, each with an indented tip, appendages two or three. Functionally male and female flowers on different plants (dioecious). Flowers with ivory to pale yellow sepals, later with purplish margins. Present in the southern Andes of Argentina and Chile, between 35°S and 53°S in moist grasslands. → Caltha appendiculata
5	Leaves spade-shaped. → 6
-	Leaves elongate triangular to spear-shaped, with two narrow appendages about 2/3× as long as the leaf. Flowers with five to eight lanceolate white sepals. In gravelly snow melt trickles in the Australian Alps and on Tasmania. → Caltha introloba
6	Spade-shaped leaves slightly longer than wide, with a slightly scalloped margin throughout and an obtuse or indented tip. Appendages triangular with slightly scalloped margin and an obtuse tip less than half as long as the leafblade and occasionally absent. Flowers with five to eight, mostly pale yellow, narrow ovate sepals (widest between base and middle). Grows on montane and subalpine damp fields in New Zealand south of 39°S. → Caltha novae-zelandiae
-	Spade-shaped leaves about as long as wide, with a scalloped margin at base tending to shallowly lobed, with an obtuse or indented tip. Appendages more than half as long as the leafblade with deeply scalloped to shallowly lobed outer margin and an entire inner margin. Flowers with five to eight white narrow obovate sepals (widest between tip and middle). Inhabits subalpine fields on New Zealand's South Island. → Caltha obtusa
7	Plants with aerial leaves and erect or decumbent stems, sometimes developing roots after flowering. Flowers larger than 1.5 cm with four or mostly five to eight sepals. → 8
-	Aquatic plant with floating or creeping stems that root at the nodes, with often floating, kidney-shaped leaves of 2–5 cm, sometimes tinged purple. Flowers about 1 cm in diameter (maximally 13 mm) with four or mostly five white or pale pink sepals. Grows in fresh water or on mud in North-America and northern Asia. → Caltha natans
8	Plants 8 to 40 cm. Stems with one or two flowers, without or with one stipule, never rooting at the nodes. Fruits (follicles) seated on the receptacle or on a short stem (stipitate). → 9
-	Plants 10 to 80 cm. Stems usually with four to nine but occasionally less flowers, with one to several stipules, sometimes rooting at the nodes after flowering. Typical plants have yellow flowers and tricolpate pollen, but a variety with white and mostly pantoporate pollen, and one with magenta flowers exist. Follicles are always seated. Occurs in marches, fens, ditches, wet woods and the bank of streams, from alpine meadows to river deltas, and is widely distributed throughout temperate and arctic Europe, Asia and North-America, but is absent in Franz Josef Land, Svalbard, Greenland, Baffin, Devon and Ellesmere Islands. → Caltha palustris: Smaller plants, with few-flowered decumbent stems rooting at the nodes after flowering. Grows at the northern edges of the distribution area of the species and on erosion prone banks. → var. radicans; Larger plants, with many-flowered erect stems rooting at the nodes after flowering. Occurs in the Netherlands in a fresh water tidal zone (De Biesbosch). → var. araneosa (only generally recognised in the Netherlands); Flowers white, pollen pantoporate or sometimes tricolpate. Between 2200 and 3500 m along rivulets in Afghanistan, Pakistan and the western Himalayas from Kashmir to northern India. → var. alba; Flowers magenta. Between 4000 and 5000 m in alpine meadows and mossy slopes between shrubs and tall herbs in the eastern Himalayas of Assam and southern Tibet. → var. purpurea; Plants in cultivation with orange-brown flowers are a probable cross between plants with yellow and magenta flowers. Plants with flowers only consisting of many rows of sepals are often in cultivation and are known under various names, among which are c.v. “Multiplex”, "Semiplena" or “Flore Plena”.
9	Plants 8–20 cm. Leafblade longer than wide. Flowers one or two on a petiole. Flowers with five to nine yellow obtuse sepals. Follicles stalked. Pollen always tricolpate. In marshy alpine vegetations in the Himalayas between 4000–6000 m from Nepal, Sikkim and southern Tibet to Yunnan and Gansu. → Caltha scaposa
-	Plants 10–40 cm. Leafblade wider than long to longer than wide. Flowers one or two on a petiole sometimes with one stipule. Flowers usually with seven to nine (but occasionally as little as five and as many as thirteen) white or rarely yellow, linear-oblong or oblong-ovate sepals. Follicles mostly seated but occasionally on a very short stalk. Pollen pantoporate, pantocolpate or tricolpate. Grows in western North America, from the Sierra Nevada, the Cascade Range and the Rocky Mountains, northwards to southwestern Alaska. → Caltha leptosepala A complex species that has two distinct subspecies in the southwest and southeast of its range, but in the north of its range the distinguishing sets of characters can be found in any combination, and such plants cannot be assigned to either subspecies.: One or two flowers with oblong-ovate white sepals. The kidney-shaped leaves of up to 15 cm long have an obtuse tip and basal lobes touching or overlapping. Pollen pantoporate or sometimes pantocolpate. It grows in open, marshy vegetation in the Sierra Nevada and the Cascade Range in California, western Nevada, Oregon, western Washington, and on Vancouver Island. → ssp. howellii; One or exceptionally two flowers with white, linear-oblong sepals. Leaves ovate heart-shaped up to 7 cm long have an obtuse to acuminate tip and basal lobes not touching. Pollen tricolpate. It can be found in open marshy alpine and subalpine places in the Rocky Mountains of northeastern Arizona, Colorado, southeastern Idaho, southern Montana, northeastern Nevada, Utah and Wyoming. → ssp. leptosepala var. leptosepala; Sepals yellow. It occurs in wet alpine and subalpine meadows in the Rocky Mountains of Montana and Idaho. → ssp. leptosepala var. sulphurea

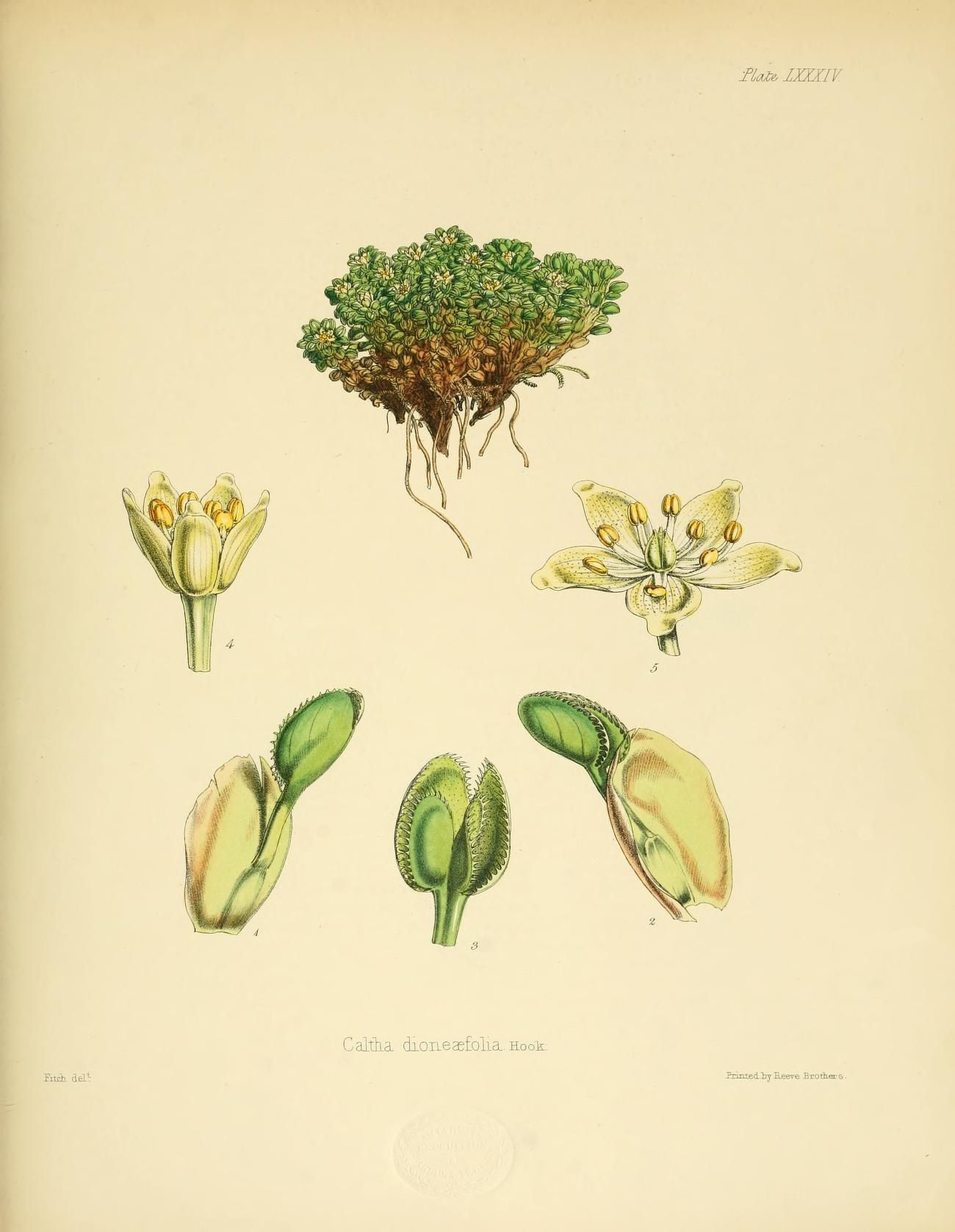
C. dionaeifolia

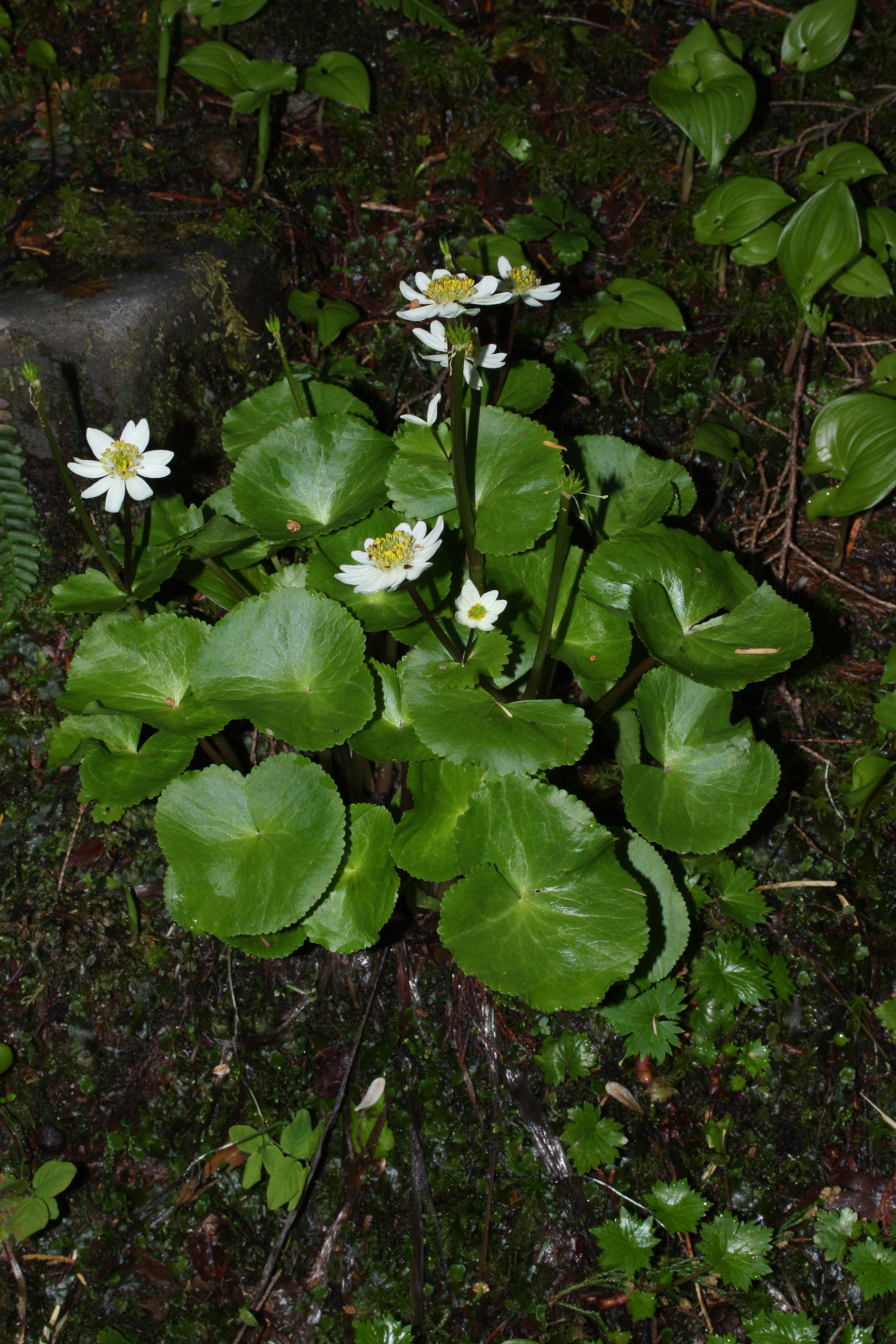
C. leptosepala ssp. howellii

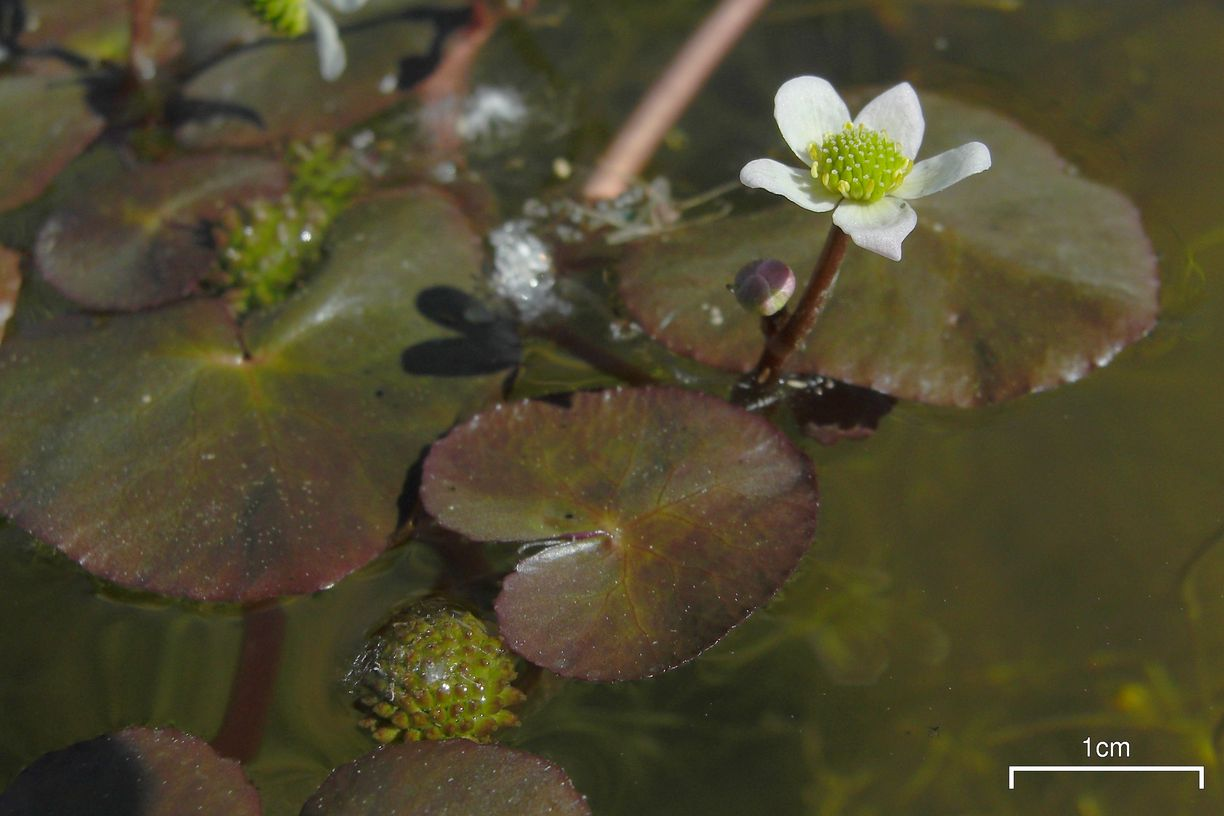
C. natans

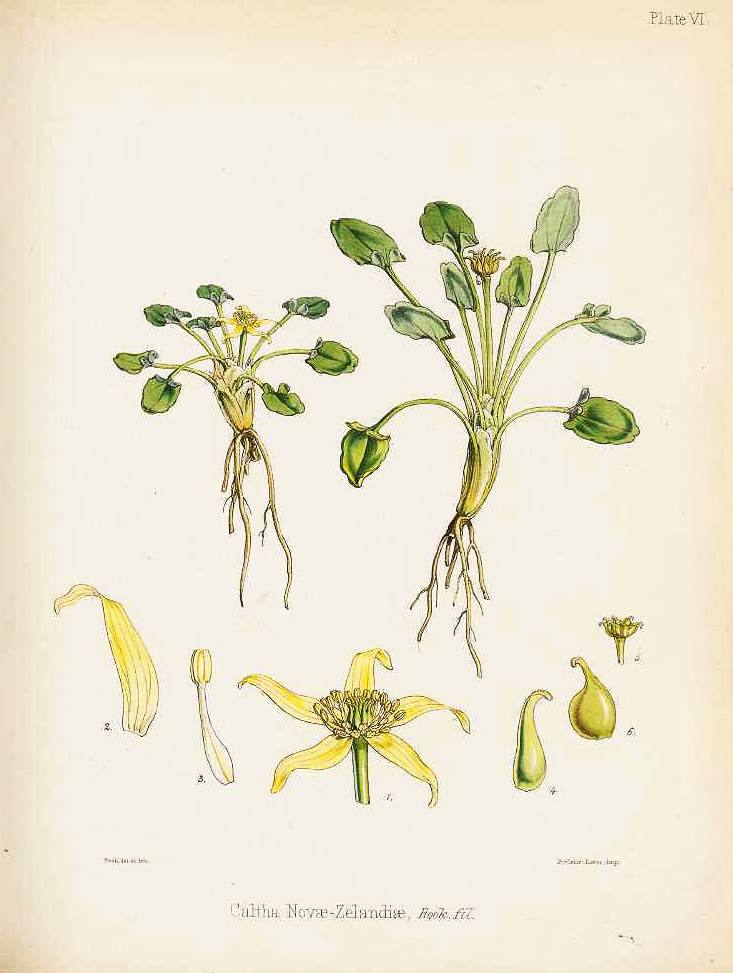
C. novae-zelandiae

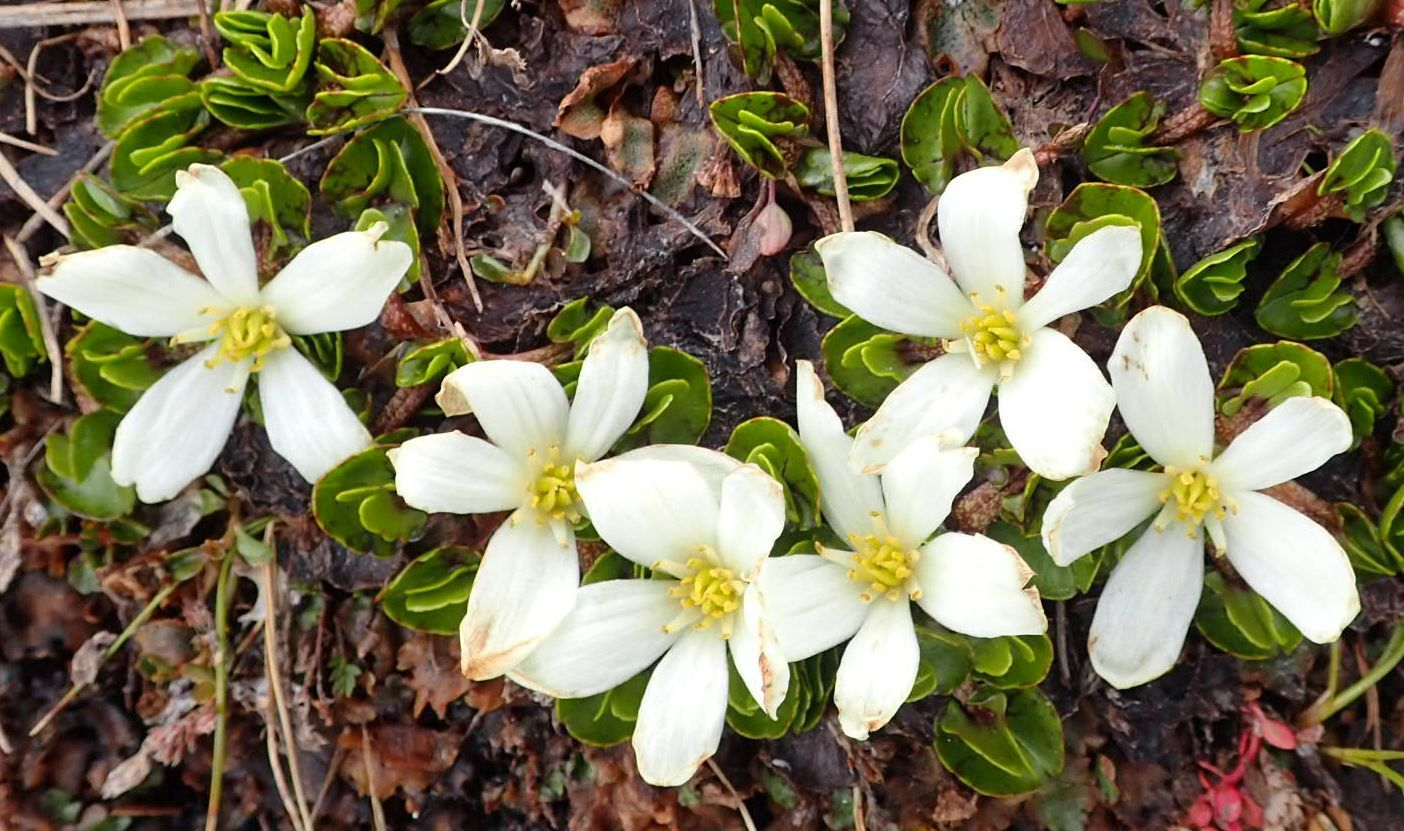
C. obtusa

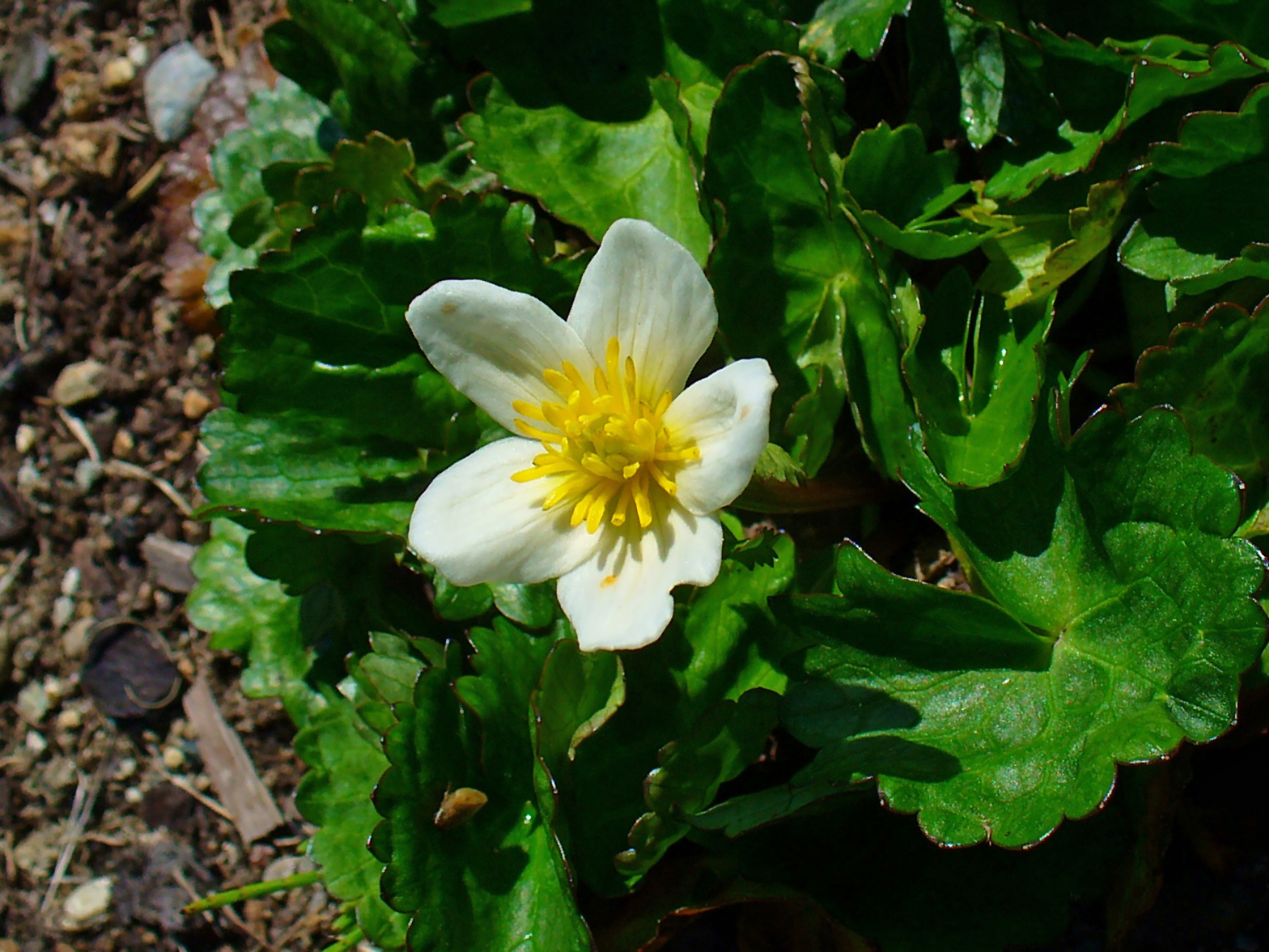
C. palustris var. alba

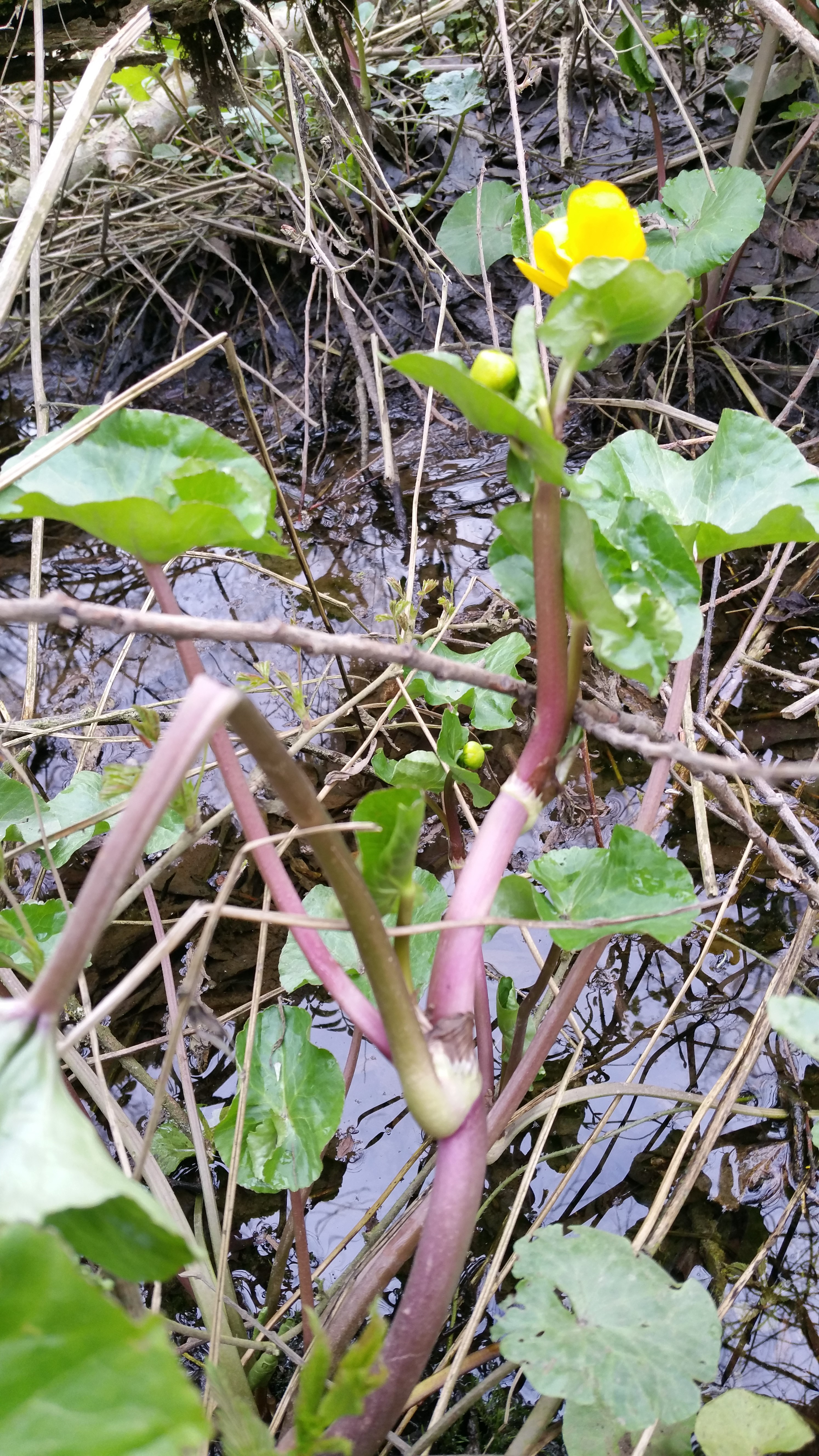
C. palustris var. araneosa

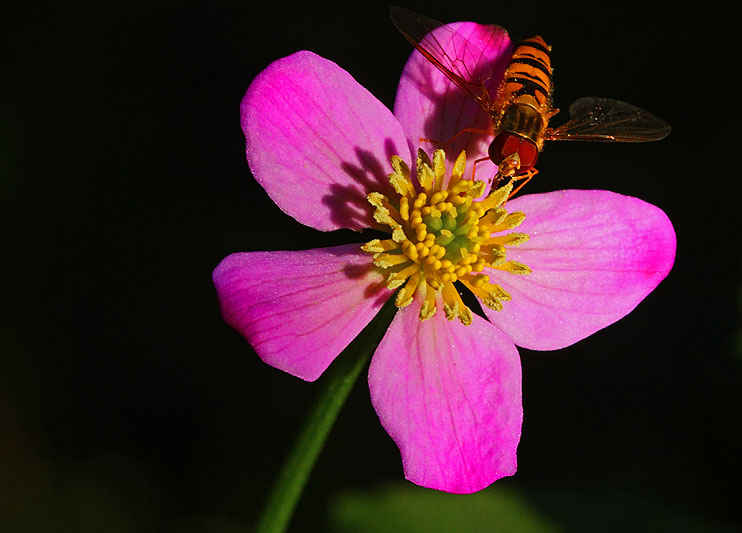
C. palustris var. purpurea

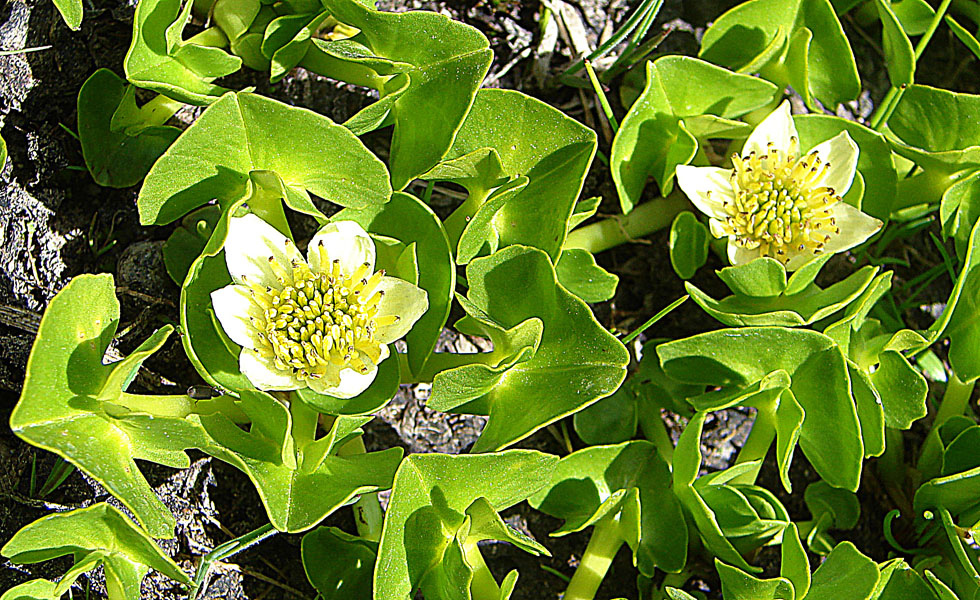
C. sagittata

== Taxonomy ==
=== Taxonomic history ===
The oldest description that is generally acknowledged in the botanical literature dates from 1700 under the name Populago by Joseph Pitton de Tournefort in part 1 of his Institutiones rei herbariae. He distinguished between P. flore major, P. flore minor and P. flore plena, and already says all of these are synonymous to Caltha palustris, without mentioning any previous author. As a plant name published before 1 May 1753, Populago Tourn. is invalid. And so is the first description as Caltha palustris by Carl Linnaeus in his Genera Plantarum of 1737. But Linnaeus re-describes the species under the same name in Species Plantarum of 1 May 1753, thus providing the correct name.

Caltha palustris is a highly variable species. When the growing season is shorter, plants are generally much smaller and may root at the nodes of the stems after flowering. Through history, many proposals have been made to split it into different (often numerous) taxa. Popular characters to distinguish between taxa concern the follicle. Most of the differences between populations are probably phenotypic adaptations to particular circumstances without a genetic basis. Variability within populations is also considerable. Varieties that are widely recognised are C. palustris var. palustris, C. palustris var. radicans (small plants with decumbent stems rooting at the nodes), C. palustris var. araneosa (big plants with erect stems forming young plants at the nodes), C. palustris var. alba (with white flowers) and C. palustris var. purpurea (with magenta flowers).

Caltha leptosepala also is highly variable. There may be mostly one or mostly two flowers per stem, many lanceolate sepals or fewer ovate sepals, smaller hart-shaped or larger kidney-shaped leaves, and pollen may be of two different types. Populations on the US westcoast and the US Rocky Mountains consistently differ from each other by fixed combinations of these character states and two subspecies are distinguished: ssp. leptosepala and ssp. howellii. Curiously, these fixed combinations cannot be found in the Canadian Rocky Mountains and in Alaska. For this reason the subspecies status is generally preferred over distinguishing a separate species (Caltha biflora).

Caltha sagittata has a rather large distribution. Usually the leaves have so called appendages, which are lobes at the base that are at a sharp angle with the top lobe. In some northern forms these appendages are in the same plane as the remainder of the leafblade, and these plants are sometimes recognised as C. alata. Some character states gradually change over its distribution area, and the angle of the basal lobes does not seem to be special in this respect.

The remaining species vary less and have not been divided into subtaxa.

=== Modern classification ===
Historically, the genus Caltha has been divided over two sections: Populago (now Caltha) that included all Northern Hemisphere species, and Psychrophila that contained all Southern Hemisphere species. The latter is sometimes regarded as a separate genus, but other authors find the morphological differences too small to legitimate that status. Support for both opinions can still be found all over scientific and colloquial sources.

=== Phylogeny ===
Genetic analysis suggest that three monophyletic groups can be identified. C. natans turns out to be sister to all other species. It also turns out that C. leptosepala is the sister of all Southern Hemisphere species and should be moved into the Psychrophila group. Within that section the New Zealand and Australian species form one cluster, C. appendiculata and C. dionaeifolia form a second cluster, while the third South American species, C. sagittata, is sister to both these clusters. The remaining Northern Hemisphere species, C. palustris and C. scaposa make up the new content of the Caltha group. This suggests the genus originates in the Northern Hemisphere, and dispersed from North America to South America and from there to New Zealand and Australia. Relations between the species are represented by the following tree.

- genusCaltha
  - Thacla‑group
    Caltha natans
  - - Caltha‑group
      - Caltha palustris
      - Caltha scaposa
    - Psychrophila‑group
      - Caltha leptosepala ssp. howellii
      - - Caltha leptosepala ssp. leptosepala
        - - - Caltha sagittata
          - - - Caltha appendiculata
              - Caltha dionaeifolia
            - - Caltha novae-zelandiae
              - Caltha obtusa
              - Caltha introloba

=== Reassigned species ===
Some species that were described as Caltha have been reassigned to other genera later on.

- C. bisma = Aconitum undetermined sp.
- C. camschatica = Oxygraphis glacialis
- C. codua = Aconitum undetermined sp.
- C. glacialis = Oxygraphis glacialis
- C. hiranoi = Ranunculus ficaria
- C. nirbisia = Aconitum undetermined sp.
- C. officinalis = Calendula officinalis

=== Etymology ===
The generic name Caltha is derived from the Ancient Greek: κάλαθος (kalathos), meaning "goblet", and is said to refer to the shape of the flower.

== Distribution ==
Caltha species are found in the cold and temperate regions of the Northern Hemisphere, the Andes and Patagonia, and alpine areas in Australia and New Zealand. It is absent from lower altitudes in the tropics and subtropics, in Africa, on Greenland and some other arctic island, from Antarctica and subantarctic islands and from oceanic islands. C. natans occurs in Siberia and North America, but not in Europe. C. palustris has the widest distribution and is present in the cold and temperate regions of the Northern Hemisphere, but cannot be found in the Western United States. C. scaposa is an alpine species with a limited distribution on the south-eastern rim of the Highland of Tibet. Caltha leptosepala occurs in western North-America from Alaska to California and Colorado. C. sagittata is another species that occurs in moist alpine meadows, in this case from Colombia to Tierra del Fuego, growing at less altitude further from the equator. C. appendiculata occurs in the moist mountains and hills of southern Patagonia. The remaining four species all have limited distribution areas: C. dionaeifolia on the southern tip of Patagonia, C. introloba in the Australian Alps and on Tasmania, C. novae-zelandiae in the mountains of North and South Island of New Zealand, while C. obtusa is restricted to the South Island. Caltha palustris is cultivated as a garden ornamental in all temperate regions and may sometimes have escaped.

== Ecology ==
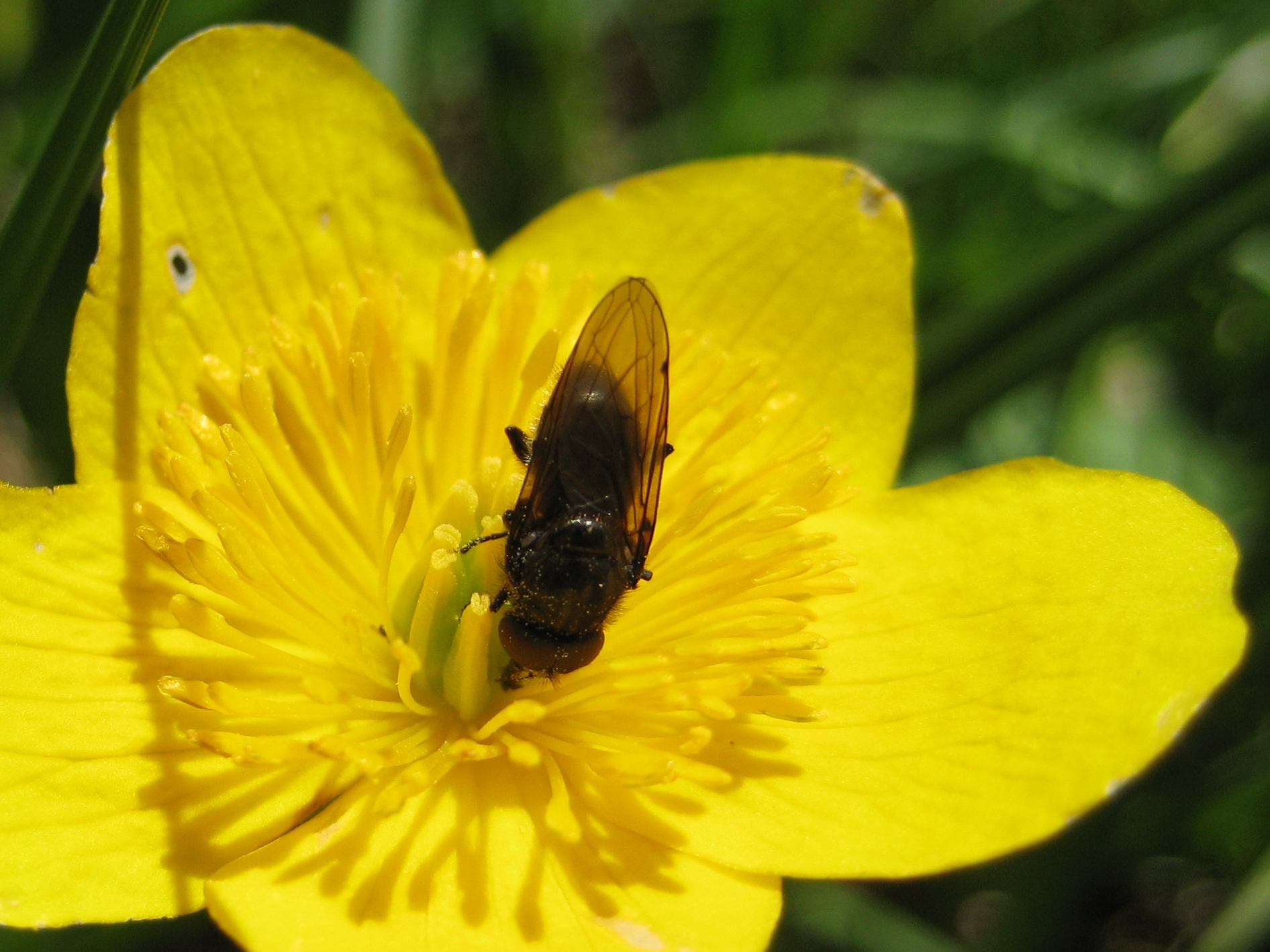
hoverfly of the genus Cheilosia visiting C. palustris

Information about the ecology of Caltha species is scarce except for C. palustris. This species contains a number of noxious chemicals such as anemonin, a trait it shares with other ranunculids, and this is probably the reason members of the entire family are avoided by vertebrate animals. Beetles and mining fly larvae cause little damage in C. palustris. Pollination is mediated by a lot of different insects, but most prominently by flies, bees and beetles.

Although it was suggested that pollination in C. palustris could be assisted by rain, there is also proof for self-infertility. When ripe follicles open, they form a "splash cup" from which seeds are expelled if raindrops hit them at the right angle. C. palustris seeds also have some spongy tissue that makes them float on water, until they wash up in a location that may be suitable for this species to grow. C. introloba was shown to have a life cycle that is adapted to snow cover and a short growing season. Flowerbuds have fully developed when the first snow remains, so that when it melts in spring the flowers can open immediately. Seeds germinate better and faster after a cold period.
