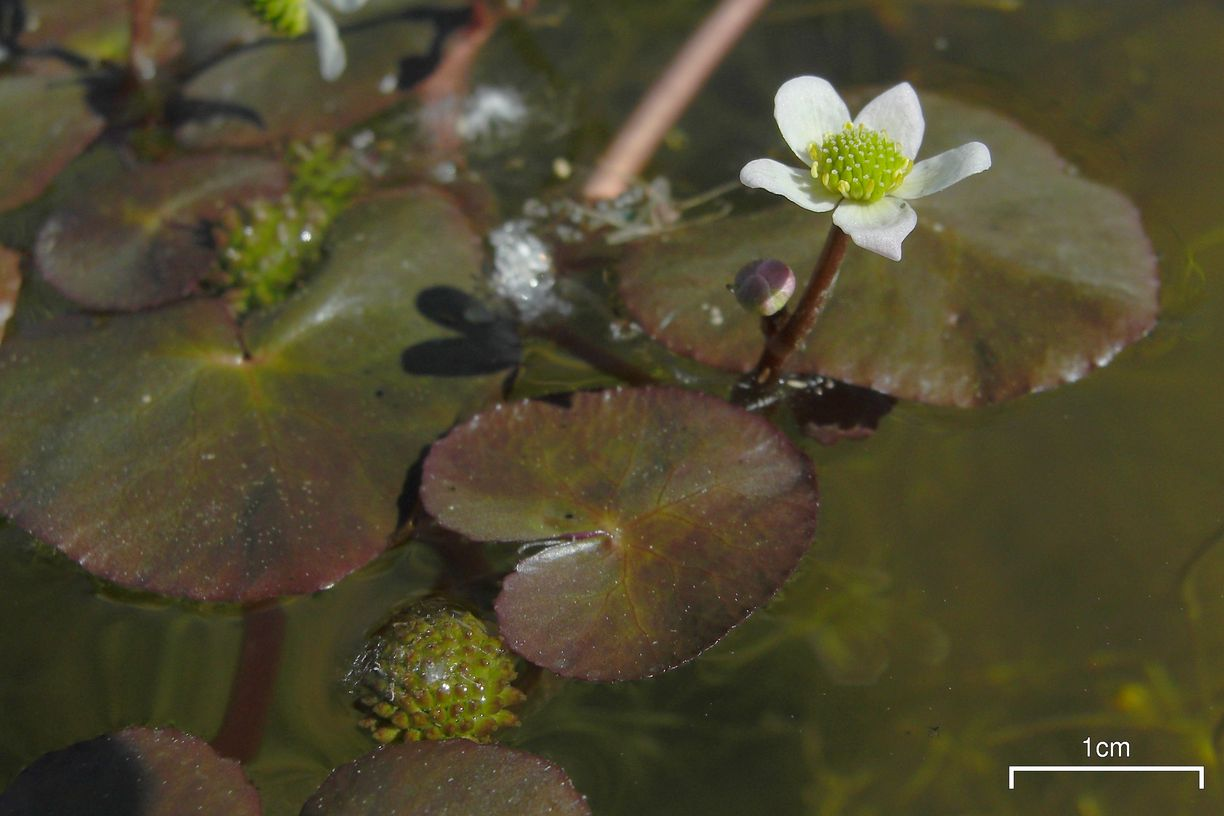

Scientific classification
- Kingdom: Plantae
- Clade: Tracheophytes
- Clade: Angiosperms
- Clade: Eudicots
- Order: Ranunculales
- Family: Ranunculaceae
- Genus: Caltha
- Species: C. natans

Binomial name
- Caltha natans Pall. ex Georgi

Synonyms
- Caltha baicalensis P.A.Demidov ex Steud.; Caltha pusilla Pursh; Thacla natans (Pall.) Deyl & Soják

= Caltha natans =

Species of flowering plant

Caltha natans is a species of flowering plant in the buttercup family. It goes by the common name floating marsh marigold.

== Description ==
Caltha natans is an aquatic herbaceous perennial that is insect pollinated. Unlike other species of Caltha that are found in North America, C. natans shows relatively little morphological variation, and has not been divided into infraspecific taxa. The plants typically grow in shallow water, with floating leaves up to 25 millimetres (0.98 in) wide and 50 mm (2.0 in) long, on a petiole (leaf stalk) up to 70 mm (2.8 in) long. The flowers are roughly 5 mm (0.20 in) in diameter and have five white or pinkish sepals; they are produced in late spring (June–August). Each flower forms 20–55 follicles, which contain black, elliptic seeds 0.5–0.8 mm (0.020–0.031 in) in diameter.

== Distribution ==
Caltha natans has an amphi-Beringian distribution, being found in both North America and East Asia. In Asia, it is found in Siberia, Mongolia, and the Chinese provinces of Heilongjiang and Nei Mongol. In North America, it is found in Alaska, the Canadian provinces of British Columbia, North West Territories, Yukon, Saskatchewan, Alberta, Manitoba, and Ontario, and in a small part of the contiguous United States (in the states of Minnesota and Wisconsin).

In Minnesota, it is listed as a threatened species, it is generally rare or very localized throughout its native range in North America. It has only been found a few times south of the Canadian border and a number of these locations have been wiped out by habitat loss.

== Habitat ==
Caltha natans is found growing in shallow, slow-moving streams and creeks. It is also found in pools, ditches, and along sheltered lake margins, swamps, and beaver ponds. The stems root at the nodes in mud, silt, or clay. It can be found growing in populations with a few scattered individuals, or as dense mats consisting of many plants. In Minnesota, C. natans has been found growing with other plants like Glyceria spp. (manna grass), Carex spp. (sedges), Potamogeton spp. (pondweed), and Utricularia spp. (bladderwort).
