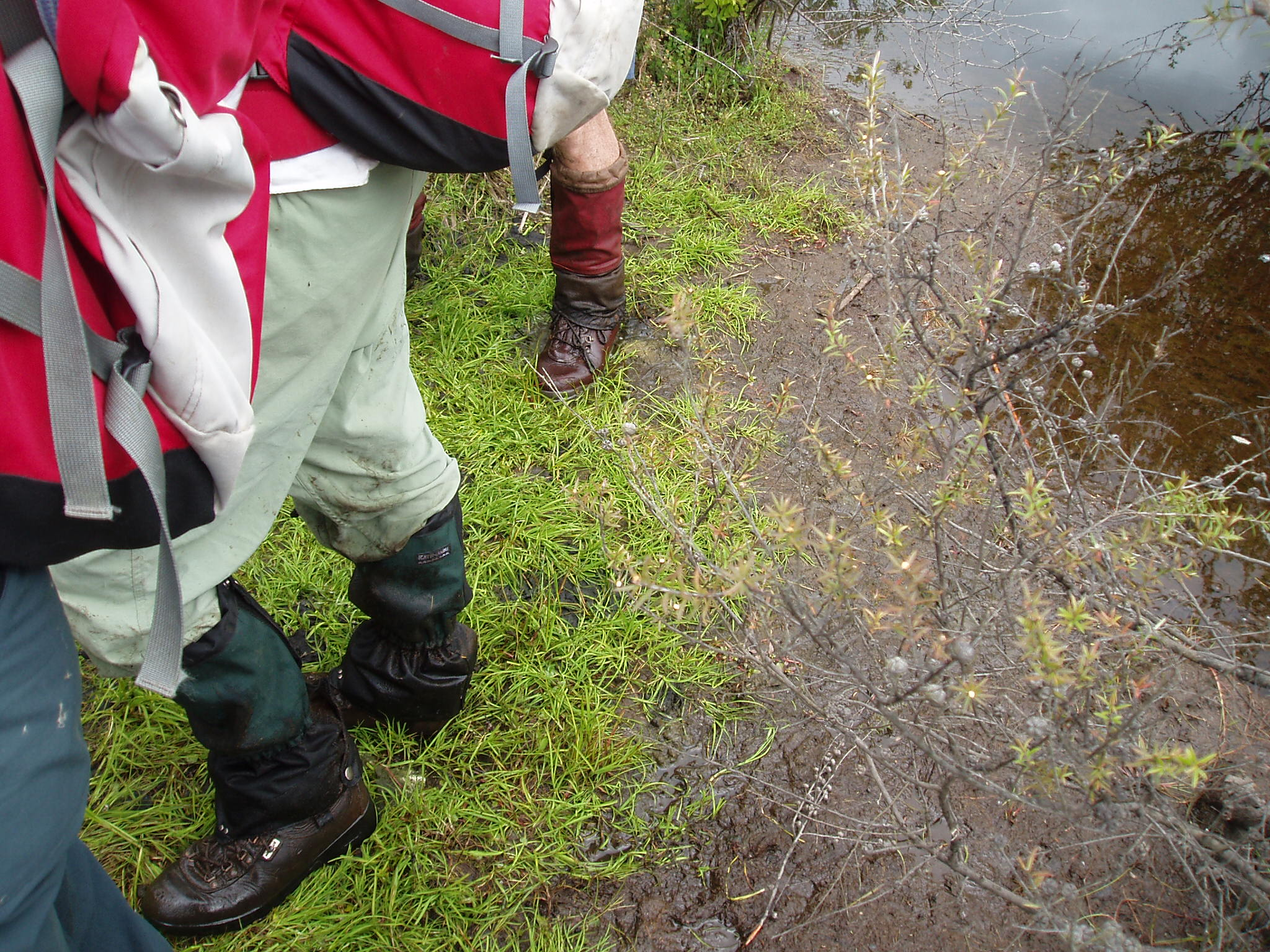

Scientific classification
- Kingdom: Plantae
- Clade: Tracheophytes
- Clade: Angiosperms
- Clade: Monocots
- Clade: Commelinids
- Order: Poales
- Family: Cyperaceae
- Genus: Carex
- Species: C. gaudichaudiana

Binomial name
- Carex gaudichaudiana Kunth

= Carex gaudichaudiana =

Species of plant

Carex gaudichaudiana, also known as fen sedge, is a tussock-forming species of perennial sedge in the family Cyperaceae. It is native to parts of Australia and New Zealand.

== Description ==
The sedge has a long rhizome with loosely tufted shoots. The erect and roughly textured culms are 10 to 90 cm (3.9 to 35.4 in) in length and have a triangular cross-section with a diameter of about 1 mm (0.039 in). The dark green leaves are longer than the culms and have a width of 2 to 4 mm (0.079 to 0.157 in) and have a rough texture at the edges and are surrounded by pale yellow-brown to orange-brown coloured sheaths. It has erect inflorescences with a length of 7 to 8 cm (2.8 to 3.1 in) composed of three to eight spikes. In its native range it flowers in Spring and Summer between September and February.

== Taxonomy ==
The species was first described by the botanist Carl Sigismund Kunth in 1837 as a part of the work Enumeratio Plantarum Omnium Hucusque Cognitarum, Secundum Familias Naturales Disposita, Adjectis Characteribus, Differentiis et Synonymis. Stutgardiae et Tubingae. It has six synonyms;

- Carex gaudichaudiana var. typica Domin
- Carex lacerans Kük.
- Carex micrantha var. tenuinervis (Kük.) Kük.
- Carex semiplena var. tenuinervis Kük.
- Carex vulgaris var. gaudichaudiana (Kunth) Boott
- Carex vulpi-caudata Akiyama.

== Distribution ==
It is often found in damp areas including eastern and south eastern parts of Australia including South Australia, Victoria, New South Wales, Queensland and Tasmania as well as the North Island and South Island of New Zealand.

== See also ==
- List of Carex species
