= Rytidosperma pumilum =

Conservation status
- Vulnerable (EPBC Act)

Scientific classification
- Kingdom: Plantae
- Clade: Tracheophytes
- Clade: Angiosperms
- Clade: Monocots
- Clade: Commelinids
- Order: Poales
- Family: Poaceae
- Genus: Rytidosperma
- Species: R. pumilum

Binomial name
- Rytidosperma pumilum (Kirk) H.P.Linder

Synonyms
- Erythranthera pumila

Species of grass

Rytidosperma pumilum, also known as feldmark grass, is a species of grass in the family Poaceae. It indigenous to Australia and New Zealand and was described as Atropis pumila in 1881 by English-New Zealand botanist Thomas Kirk.

== Description ==
Feldmark grass is a small and inconspicuous tufted bunchgrass, with its leaves growing to about 3 cm in height, and its flowering stems to about 7 cm. The leaves have broad, papery sheaths which are often curved or twisted spirally. The two to four spikelets are held against the flowering stem, with each containing two to four flowers.

=== Identification ===
As a Rytidosperma, the easiest way to identify R. pumilum is to select a single floret (which will contain a single awn, two lateral lobes, and usually three rows of hairs - one on the callus and two on the lemma). The arrangement of the hairs, as well as the relative lengths of the awn, lateral lobes, sometimes the callus can help identify to species, using a key such as that found in the New Zealand Flora.

== Distribution and habitat ==
In Australia feldmark grass has a very restricted occurrence, being limited to about 3 ha of the Main Range of Kosciuszko National Park between Mount Lee and Mount Northcote. It also occurs in alpine parts of New Zealand. It is found only in feldmark communities, which are subject to freezing conditions and severe winds.

== Conservation status ==
Feldmark grass is listed as being Vulnerable under Australia's Environment Protection and Biodiversity Conservation Act 1999.

== Taxonomy ==
=== Etymology ===
Rytidosperma: 'wrinkled seed' from the Greek 'rhytidos' = wrinkled and 'sperma' = seed
