= Rytidosperma tenue =

Scientific classification
- Kingdom: Plantae
- Clade: Tracheophytes
- Clade: Angiosperms
- Clade: Monocots
- Clade: Commelinids
- Order: Poales
- Family: Poaceae
- Genus: Rytidosperma
- Species: R. tenue

Binomial name
- Rytidosperma tenue (Petrie) Connor & Edgar

Species of true grass

Rytidosperma tenue is a species of true grass in the subfamily Danthonioideae. It is endemic to New Zealand and was described as Danthonia buchananii var. tenuis in 1913 by Scottish-New Zealand botanist Donald Petrie. It was first recognised as a unique species by Victor Zotov in 1963, and was named as Notodanthonia tenuis.

== Description ==
=== Identification ===
As a Rytidosperma, the easiest way to identify R. tenue is to select a single floret (which will contain a single awn, two lateral lobes, and usually three rows of hairs - one on the callus and two on the lemma). The arrangement of the hairs, as well as the relative lengths of the awn, lateral lobes, sometimes the callus can help identify to species, using a key such as that found in the New Zealand Flora.

=== Similar species ===
R. tenue is similar to other Rytidosperma with lemma lobes at most only slightly longer than the lemma, and upper lemma hairs equalling or shorter than tip of palea. These species form a genetic cluster (along with several Australian species).

Of these species, with its dense row of upper lemma hairs, it is most similar to R. maculatum and R. pulchrum. It can be distinguished from R. maculatum by its much longer upper lemma hairs, which equal or exceed the lemma lobes. From R. pulchrum it is distinguished by its lemma which has scattered hairs between the upper and lower rows of hairs, and the callus hairs do not or just reach the lower marginal hair tufts. R. pulchrum is also restricted to the Cook Strait coasts, whereas R. tenue is only found in the dryland South Island.

== Taxonomy ==
=== Etymology ===
Rytidosperma is derived from the Greek 'wrinkled seed'; 'rhytidos' meaning wrinkled and 'sperma' meaning seed.
