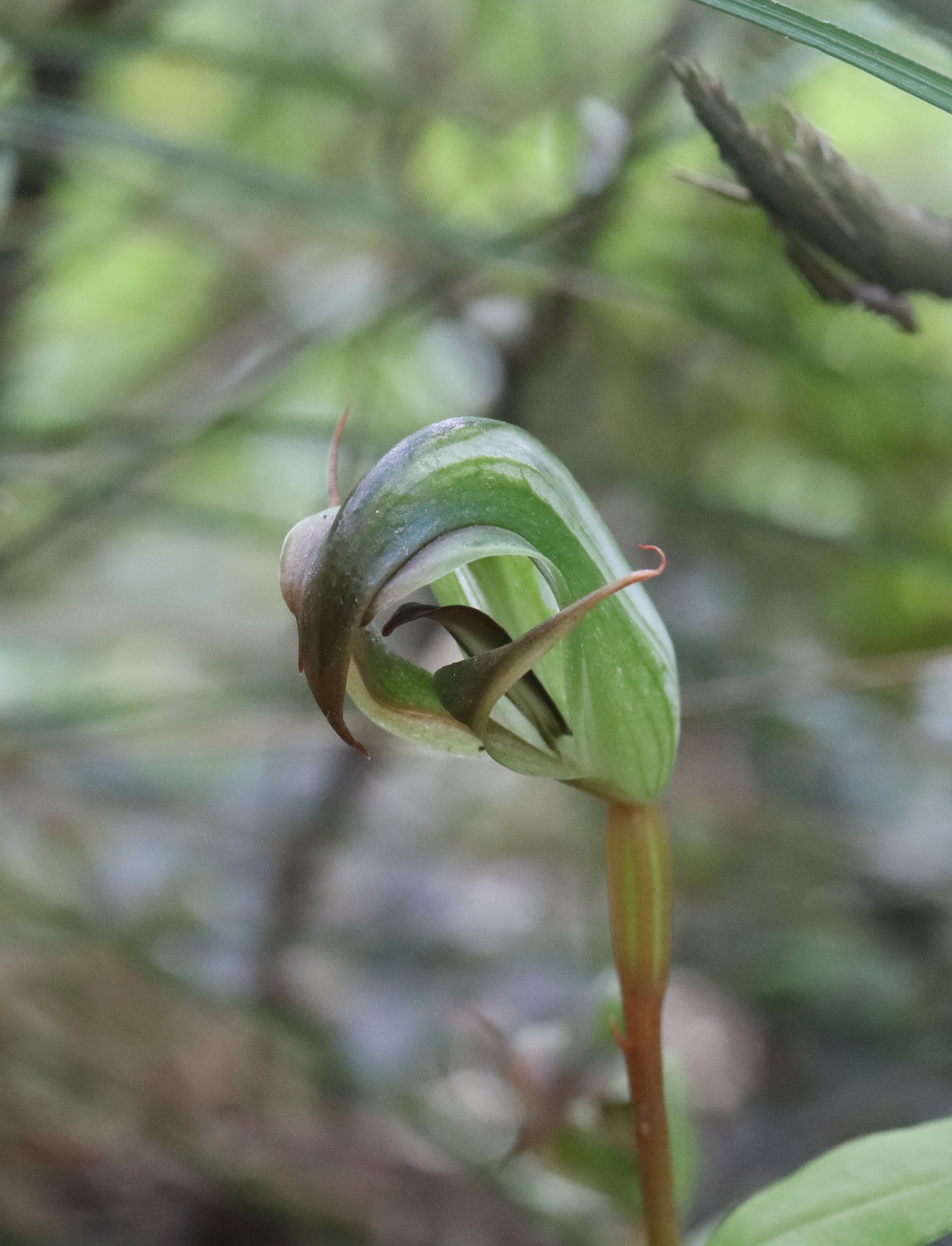
- At Lyttleton, New Zealand

Scientific classification
- Kingdom: Plantae
- Clade: Tracheophytes
- Clade: Angiosperms
- Clade: Monocots
- Order: Asparagales
- Family: Orchidaceae
- Subfamily: Orchidoideae
- Tribe: Cranichideae
- Genus: Pterostylis
- Species: P. areolata

Binomial name
- Pterostylis areolata Petrie

= Pterostylis areolata =

Greenhood

Species of orchid

Pterostylis areolata is a species of orchid endemic to New Zealand. As with similar greenhoods, the flowering plants differ from those which are not flowering. The non-flowering plants have a rosette of leaves flat on the ground but the flowering plants have a single flower with leaves on the flowering spike. This greenhood has green and translucent white-striped flowers similar to those of P. australis but the stem leaves are shorter and never higher than the flowers.

== Description ==
Pterostylis areolata is a terrestrial, perennial, deciduous, herb with an underground tuber and when not flowering, one or two egg-shaped leaves, 30–90 millimetres (1–4 in) long and 10–25 millimetres (0.4–1 in) wide. Flowering plants usually have a single pale green flower with translucent white stripes, sometimes with orange-coloured tips. The flowers are relatively large, lean forwards and are borne on a flowering stem 70–250 millimetres (3–10 in) high with between two and four stem leaves. The dorsal sepal and petals are fused, forming a hood or "galea" over the column with the dorsal sepal having a short point on its end. The lateral sepals spread apart from each other and turn towards the back of the galea. The labellum is red becoming darker near the tip. Flowering occurs from October to December.

== Taxonomy and naming ==
Pterostylis areolata was first formally described in 1968 by Donald Petrie and the description was published in Transactions and Proceedings of the New Zealand Institute from a specimen collected near the Awatere River. The specific epithet (areolata) is a Latin word meaning "with small spaces".

== Distribution and habitat ==
This greenhood grows in tussock grassland and scrub, near wetlands and in open forest. It occurs on both main islands of New Zealand, in a few places on the North Island but is widespread, especially on the eastern side of the South Island.
