= Rytidosperma maculatum =

Conservation status
- Declining (NZ TCS)

Scientific classification
- Kingdom: Plantae
- Clade: Tracheophytes
- Clade: Angiosperms
- Clade: Monocots
- Clade: Commelinids
- Order: Poales
- Family: Poaceae
- Genus: Rytidosperma
- Species: R. maculatum

Binomial name
- Rytidosperma maculatum (Zotov) Connor & Edgar

Species of plant

Rytidosperma maculatum is a species of true grass in the subfamily Danthonioideae. It is endemic to the South Island of New Zealand and was described as Notodanthonia maculatum in 1963 by Russian-New Zealand botanist Victor Zotov. It is found primarily in the drylands of Otago and Canterbury.

== Description ==
R. maculatum is a short, tufty often shortly rhizomatous grass with culms 30 cm tall, tipped with a small raceme or racemose panicle. Panicles have a few spikelets with 4-7 florets, with awns emerging from glumes. The lemma has lobed apexes, and a single awn. The florets contain three obvious rows of hairs, one on the callus, and two on the lemmas. The upper and lower lemma rows of hairs are dense and continuous, with the upper row smaller than the lemma lobes, the lower row overlapping the upper, and a few hairs outside of the rows.

R. maculatum is tetraploid, with 2n = 48 chromosomes.

R. maculatum floret, showing the short, dense upper lemma hairs, and short lemma lobes

=== Similar species ===
R. maculatum is similar to other Rytidosperma with lemma lobes at most only slightly longer than the lemma, and upper lemma hairs equalling or shorter than tip of palea. These species form a genetic cluster (along with several Australian species).

Of these species, with its dense row of upper lemma hairs, it is most similar to R. tenue and R. pulchrum. Both can be distinguished by having much longer upper lemma hairs than R. maculatum, even equalling or exceeding the lemma lobes.

=== Identification ===
As a Rytidosperma, the easiest way to identify R. maculatum is to select a single floret (which will contain a single awn, two lateral lobes, and usually three rows of hairs - one on the callus and two on the lemma). The arrangement of the hairs, as well as the relative lengths of the awn, lateral lobes, sometimes the callus can help identify to species, using a key such as that found in the New Zealand Flora.

== Distribution ==
R. maculatum is endemic to the South Island of New Zealand, found in the Canterbury, Otago, and Marlborough. Grassland of lowland and montane zones.

The holotype specimen was collected in Galloway, Central Otago, by Victor Zotov in 1929.

== Habitat and ecology ==
R. maculatum is a species of grassland in dry inland basins, plains, and downs in lowland and montane zones.

==== Associated species ====
At one site in dips between terraces in a zone of old outwash channels of Ahuriri River, R. maculatum is described as growing with cheat grass (Bromus tectorum) with browntop (Agrostis capillaris), Rytidosperma clavatum, R. caespitosum, red fescue (Festuca rubra), and ryegrass (Lolium perenne).

At Crawford Hills Road near Alexandra, R. maculatum is found growing in sparse dryland dominated by Raoulia australis mat daisies, with the wind-blown lichen Xanthoparmelia semiviridis, the sedge Carex brevicularis, the grasses, Poa colensoi, Bromus tectorum, Anthoxanthum odoratum, and the herbs Rumex acetosella, Trifolium arvense, Hypochaeris radicata, Echium vulgare, Gypsophila australis, Styphelia nana, Veronica verna.

In mine tailings of the Cambrian Hills, R. maculatum grows in outwash gravels with a variety of native herbs and grasses including Raoulia australis, Muehlenbeckia axillaris, Raoulia subsericea, Acaena inermis, Styphelia nesophila, Wahlenbergia albomarginata, Geranium sessiliflorum, Epilobium microphyllum, Melicytus alpinus, Discaria toumatou, Hieracium pilosella, and stonecrop (Sedum acre).

==== Parasites and herbivores ====
R. maculatum is also the host of Sphaerodothella danthoniae, a sac fungus that produces black, shiny leaf spots that occasionally coalesce into straight to irregular lines in the leaf surface of Rytidosperma.

R. maculatum is a food plant of the Cromwell chafer beetle (Prodontria lewisii), whose underground grubs feed on its roots.

== Threats ==
For the first three conservation status assessments (2004-2012), R. maculatum was considered Not Threatened. In 2017, it was moved to Data Deficient, and 2023 to At Risk - Declining, with Data Poor qualifiers - recognition (meaning that it is difficult to identify) and trend (meaning that the trend of decline is unknown).

In Otago, R. maculatum is considered Regionally Threatened – Vulnerable.

== Taxonomy ==
Rytidosperma maculatum was initially described as Notodanthonia maculata in 1963. The genus Notodanthonia was synonymised with Rytidosperma in Nicora (1973), after it was recognised that they referred to the same group. The genus Notodanthonia was only described in 1963 by Zotov, whereas Rytidosperma was described in 1854 by Steudel. As such, the older name Rytidosperma took priority under the International Code of Nomenclature. Aotearoa/New Zealand species (including R. maculatum) were formally moved to Rytidosperma in 1979, following this view.

=== Etymology ===
Rytidosperma: 'wrinkled seed' from the Greek 'rhytidos' = wrinkled and 'sperma' = seed.

maculatum: from the Latin 'maculatus', meaning blotched, possibly referring to the blotched glumes.
