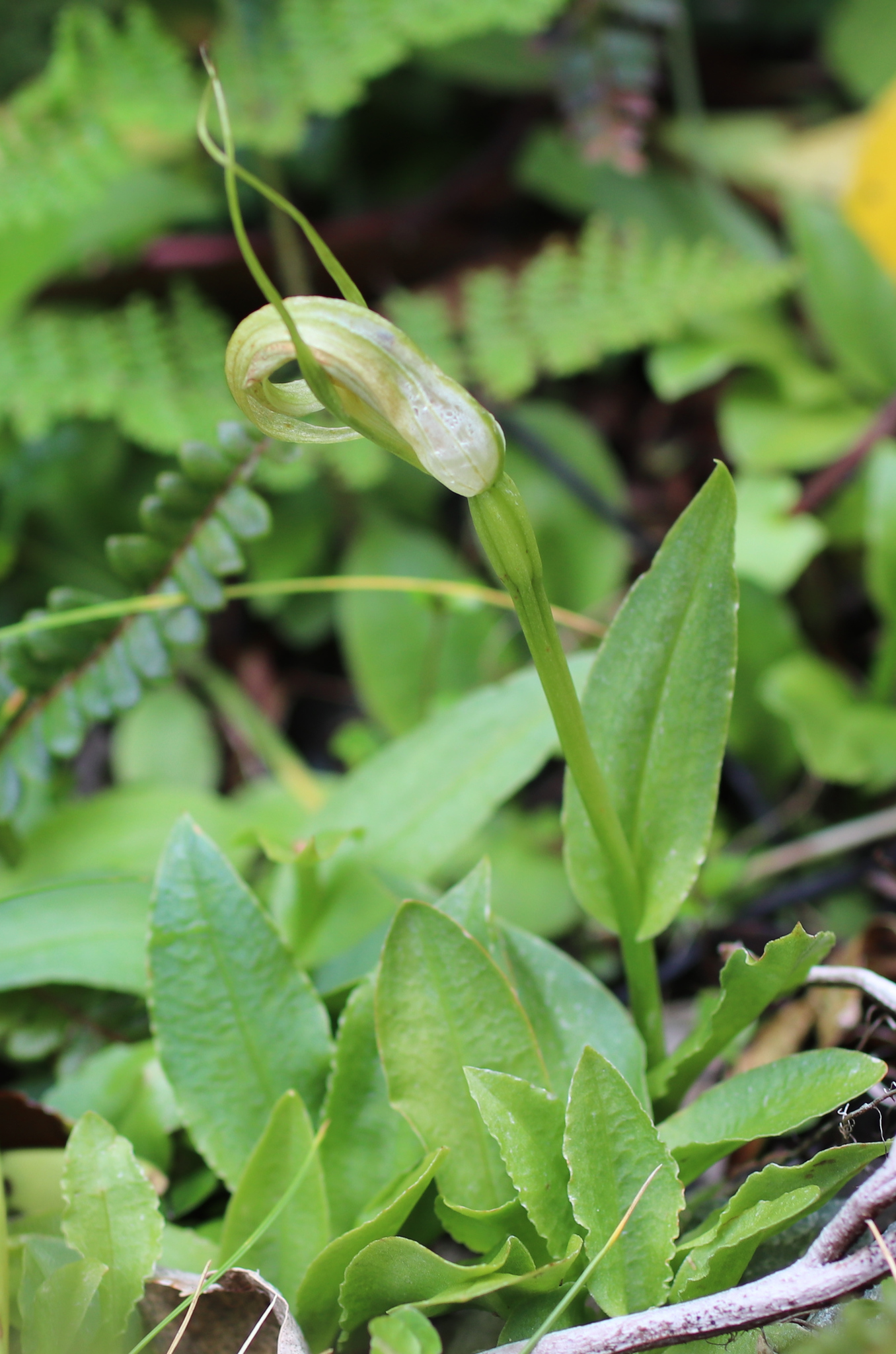

Scientific classification
- Kingdom: Plantae
- Clade: Tracheophytes
- Clade: Angiosperms
- Clade: Monocots
- Order: Asparagales
- Family: Orchidaceae
- Subfamily: Orchidoideae
- Tribe: Cranichideae
- Genus: Pterostylis
- Species: P. oliveri

Binomial name
- Pterostylis oliveri Petrie

= Pterostylis oliveri =

Oliver's greenhood

Species of orchid

Pterostylis oliveri is a species of greenhood orchid endemic to New Zealand. Flowering plants have spreading leaves on the flowering stem and a single green and white flower with a strongly down-curved dorsal sepal and long, tapering lateral sepals.

== Description ==
Pterostylis oliveri is a terrestrial, perennial, deciduous, herb with an underground tuber. Flowering plants have between three and five spreading leaves which are 50–100 mm (2–4 in) long and 20–30 mm (0.8–1 in) wide, grading from narrow egg-shaped near the base to lance-shaped near the top. There is a single green and white flower on a flowering stem 100–380 mm (4–10 in) tall. The dorsal sepal and petals are fused, forming a hood or "galea" over the column. The dorsal sepal is 30–50 mm (1.2–2.0 in) tall and curves forward then strongly downward with a long, tapering tip which is much longer than the petals. There is a gap between the galea and the lateral sepals which have long, tapering tips, spread apart from each other and are erect or turned back behind the galea. The labellum is gently curved and protrudes above the sinus between the lateral sepals. Flowering occurs in December and January.

== Taxonomy and naming ==
Pterostylis oliveri was first formally described by Donald Petrie and the description was published in Transactions and Proceedings of the New Zealand Institute in 1894. The specific epithet (oliveri) honours Professor Daniel Oliver of Kew Gardens for his assistance to Petrie.

== Distribution and habitat ==
Oliver's greenhood grows in forest and scrub, often on the side of streams or in dense leaf litter on the South Island from near Nelson to Arthurs Pass National Park.

== Conservation ==
Pterostylis oliveri is classed as "not threatened".
