= Carex carsei =

Scientific classification
- Kingdom: Plantae
- Clade: Tracheophytes
- Clade: Angiosperms
- Clade: Monocots
- Clade: Commelinids
- Order: Poales
- Family: Cyperaceae
- Genus: Carex
- Species: C. carsei

Binomial name
- Carex carsei Petrie

Species of grass-like plant

Carex carsei is a perennial sedge of the Cyperaceae family that is native to the North Island and the South Island of New Zealand.

== See also ==
- List of Carex species
