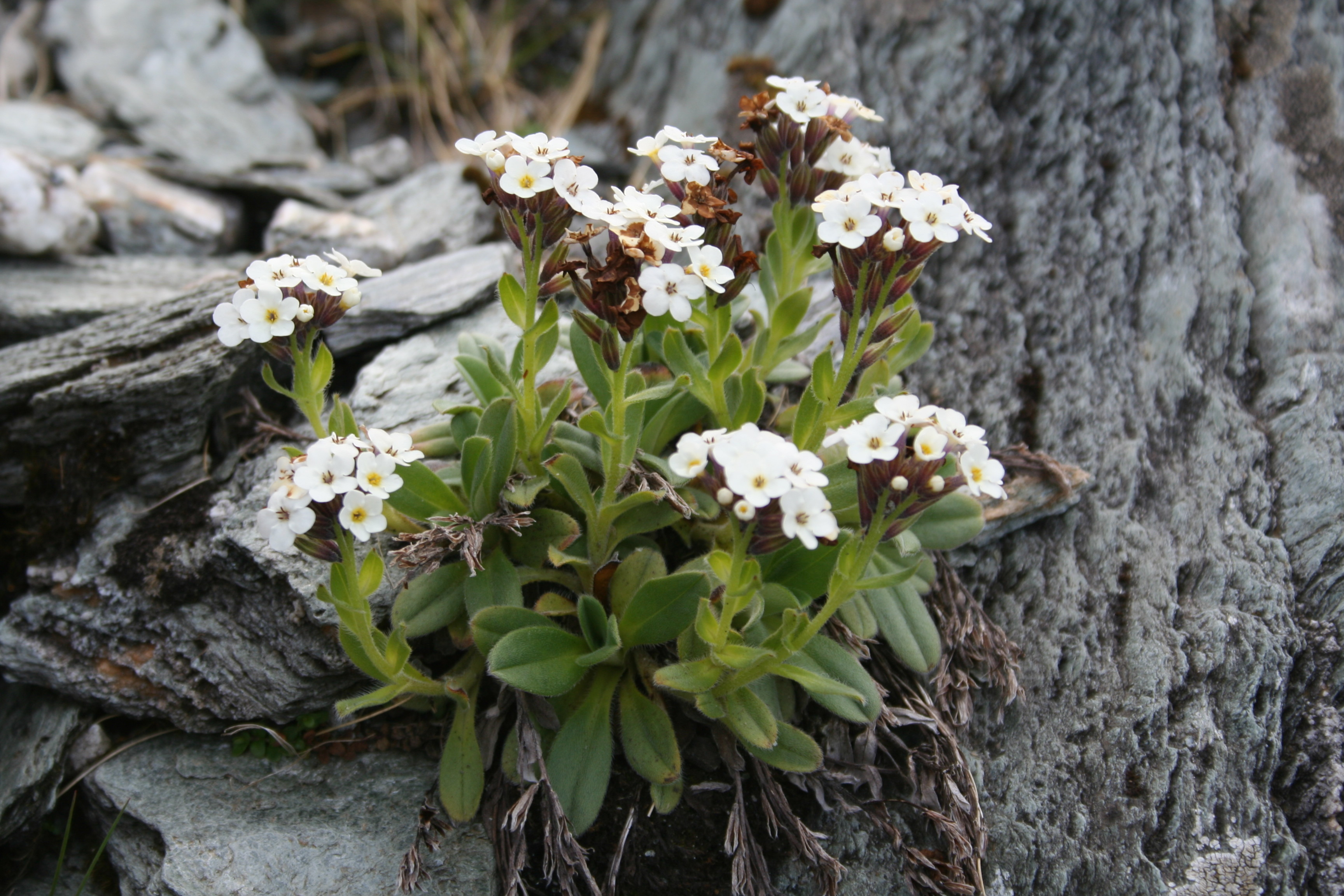
- In flower in alpine habitat

Conservation status
- Data Deficit (NZ TCS)

Scientific classification
- Kingdom: Plantae
- Clade: Tracheophytes
- Clade: Angiosperms
- Clade: Eudicots
- Clade: Asterids
- Order: Boraginales
- Family: Boraginaceae
- Genus: Myosotis
- Species: M. suavis

Binomial name
- Myosotis suavis Petrie

= Myosotis suavis =

Species of flowering plant

Myosotis suavis is a species of flowering plant in the family Boraginaceae, endemic to the South Island of New Zealand. Donald Petrie described the species in 1914. Plants of this species of forget-me-not are perennial rosettes with ebracteate inflorescences and white corollas with stamens that are partially exserted.

M. suavis is distributed among rocky alpine habitats in the South Island in the Canterbury, Westland, and Otago regions. It is listed as data deficient by the New Zealand Threat Classification System.

== Description ==
Myosotis suavis plants are rosettes. The rosette leaves have long petioles that are shorter than the leaf blades. The rosette leaf blades are 20–40 mm long by 7–15 mm wide, broadly obovate-spathulate, widest at or above the middle, with an obtuse apex. The upper surface of the leaf is uniformly and densely covered in appressed antrorse (forward-facing) hairs, whereas the lower surface is uniformly and sparsely covered in appressed retrorse (backward-facing) hairs.

Each rosette has few ascending, ebracteate inflorescences that are up to 100 mm long. The cauline leaves are similar to the rosette leaves, but are smaller, become smaller toward the top of the inflorescence, narrow-elliptic, and sessile, and have hairs similar to the rosette leaves. The flowers are several per inflorescence, and each is borne on a short pedicel, without a bract. The calyx is 5–8 mm long at flowering and fruiting, lobed to more than one-half of its length, and with densely distributed, appressed to erect hairs, some of which are retrorse near the base and others hooked. The corolla is white and 5–7 mm in diameter, with a cylindrical tube, and small scales alternating with the petals. The anthers are partially exserted, with the tips only surpassing the faucal scales. The nutlets were not described.

Flowering December–February; fruiting unknown.

=== Gallery ===
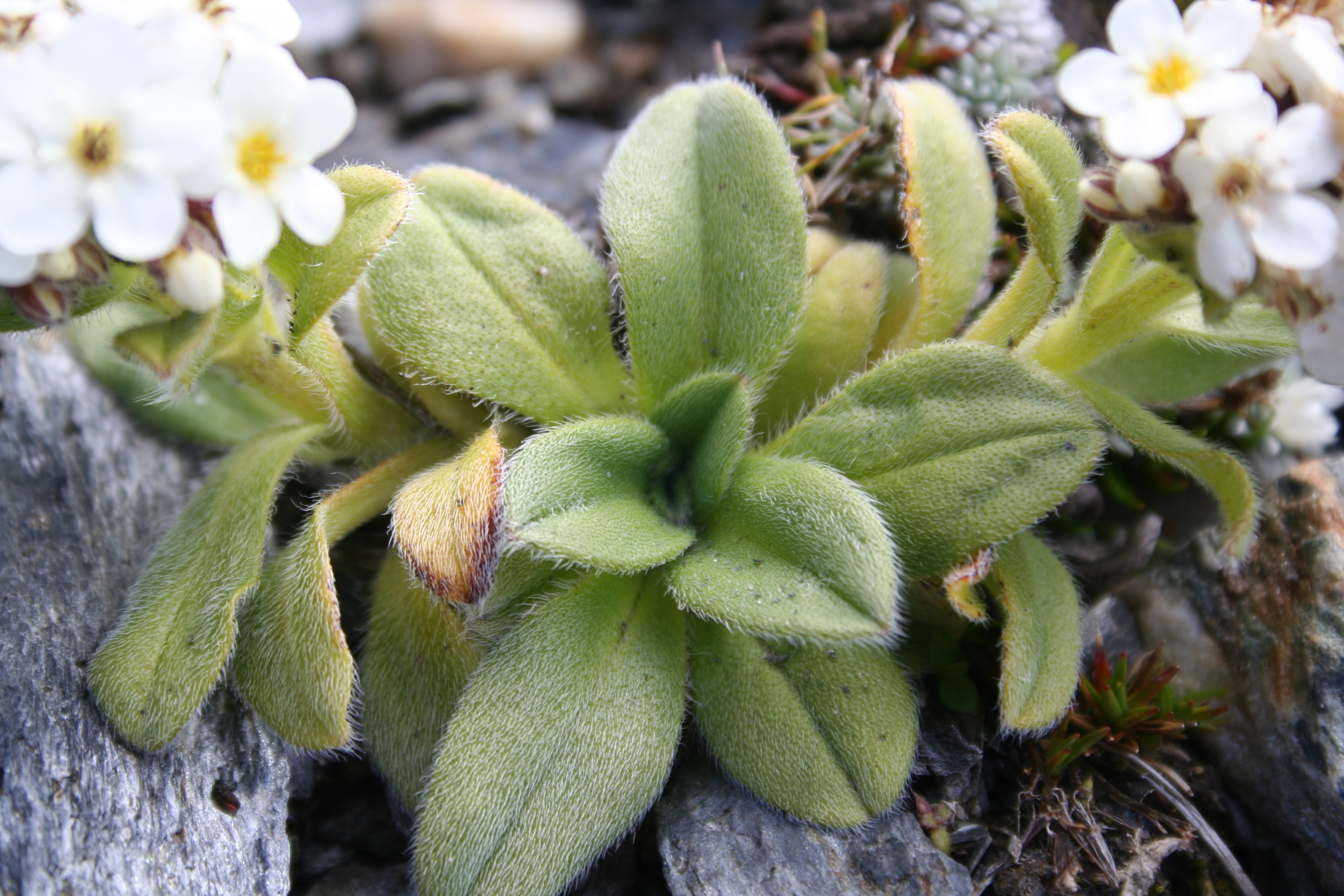
Flowering rosette

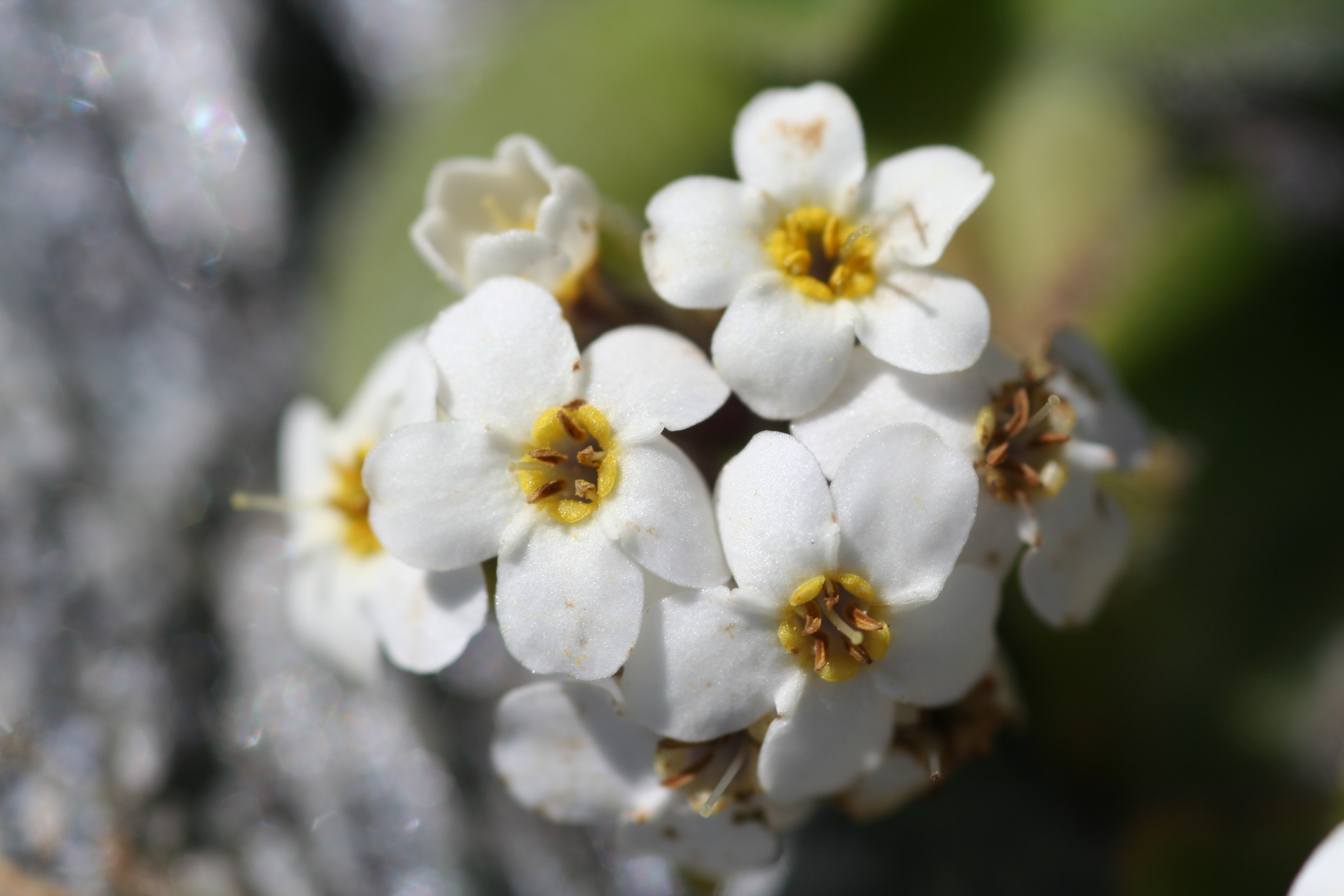
Close-up of flowers

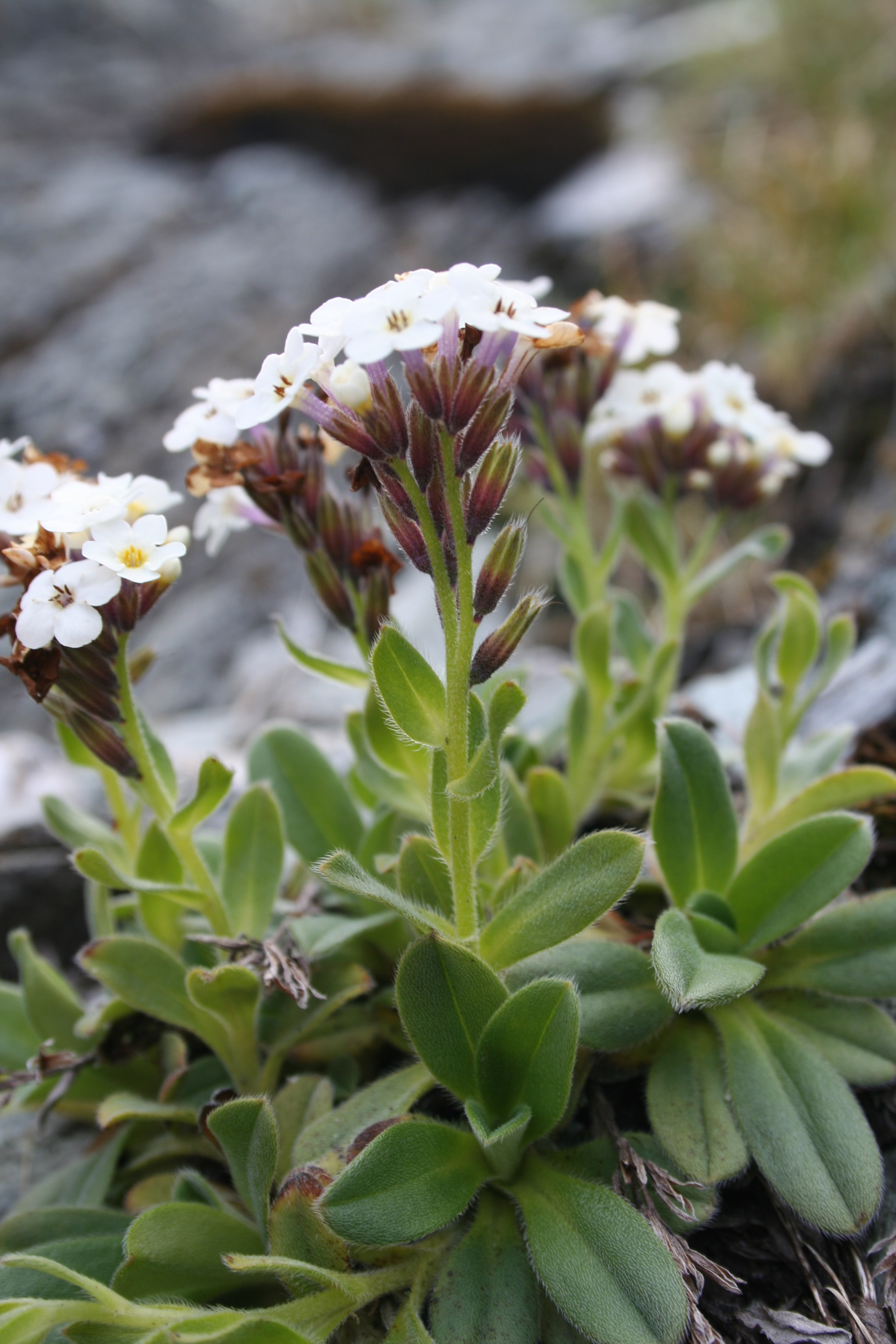
Flowering plants with erect inflorescences

== Taxonomy and etymology ==
Myosotis suavis Petrie is in the plant family Boraginaceae. The species was originally described in 1914 by Donald Petrie. The most recent treatment of this species was done by Lucy B. Moore in the Flora of New Zealand.

The original specimens (syntypes) of Myosotis suavis were collected by New Zealand mountaineer and mountain guide Peter Graham, and are lodged at the herbarium WELT at the Museum of New Zealand Te Papa Tongarewa (e.g. WELT SP002581 and SP002582).

Myosotis suavis is similar morphologically to another South Island species, M. explanata. Lucy Moore distinguished the two species in her key using the following characters:

"Hairs crowded, soft; corolla c. 7 mm. diam........Myosotis suavis

Hairs sparse, rather stiff; corolla c. 10 mm. diam.....M. explanata"

=== Phylogeny ===
Myosotis suavis was not included in any of the phylogenetic analyses of standard DNA sequencing markers (nuclear ribosomal DNA and chloroplast DNA regions) of New Zealand Myosotis.

== Distribution and habitat ==
Myosotis suavis is a forget-me-not that is found in rocky, high alpine habitats from 1000 to 2000 m ASL or higher, near the main divide in the South Island of New Zealand, in Canterbury, Westland and Otago.

== Conservation status ==
Myosotis suavis is listed as Data Deficient on the most recent assessment (2017–2018) under the New Zealand Threatened Classification system for plants.
