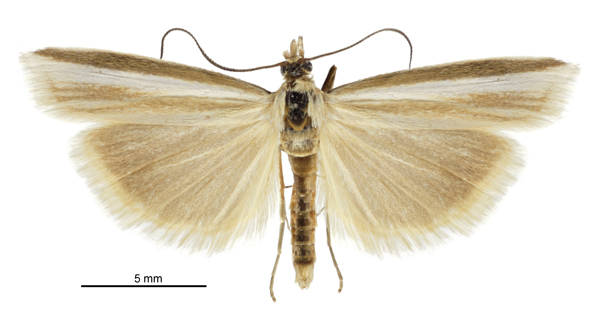
- Male

Scientific classification
- Kingdom: Animalia
- Phylum: Arthropoda
- Clade: Pancrustacea
- Class: Insecta
- Order: Lepidoptera
- Family: Crambidae
- Subfamily: Crambinae
- Tribe: Crambini
- Genus: Orocrambus
- Species: O. jansoni

Binomial name
- Orocrambus jansoni Gaskin, 1975

= Orocrambus jansoni =

Species of moth

Orocrambus jansoni is a species of moth in the family Crambidae. It is endemic to New Zealand. This species is classified as "At Risk, Naturally Uncommon" by the Department of Conservation.

== Taxonomy ==
This species was described by David Edward Gaskin in 1975 using a specimen he collected at Waiouru. The holotype specimen is held at the New Zealand Arthropod Collection.

== Description ==
Gaskin described the species as follows:

Frons conical. Eye without nude circumorbital strip. Female frenulum triple. Wingspan (male) 18-22 mm, (female) 22 mm. Antennae dark brown, serrate in male, near filiform in female. Maxillary palpi triangular, brown laterally, yellowish medially. Labial palpi dark brown laterally, yellowish medially, porrect, about 2.4 x as long as head. Thorax and abdomen yellowish to silvery white. Forewings with brown costal streak from base to apex, similar paler streak on dorsum, median area silvery white to yellowish from base to termen, anterioi end of this fascia touching acute apex, cilia brown and white; hindwings dark brown with lighter brown cilia (holotype and paratype males). Allotype female very similar but with all markings very much paler and cilia of all wings white. Male frenulum single. Legs brown speckled with white in both sexes.

== Distribution ==
This species is endemic to New Zealand. It has been recorded from the central part of the North Island, east of Mount Ruapehu.

== Biology and behaviour ==
O. jansoni are active during the day. Adults have been recorded on the wing from December to February. The female of the species is a more reluctant flier than the male. The species has been trapped with ultra-violet light as well as mercury vapour lamp traps. It has also been collected by netting or sweeping likely grasses.

== Host species and habitat ==
The host species of this moth is unconfirmed but it has been hypothesised that it is likely Rytidosperma pulchrum as females of the species have been discovered at the base of this plant. O. jansoni is known to inhabit roadside grasslands along the Desert Road north of Waiouru, and has also been collected at the Rangitaiki Frost Flats. It is likely that it also inhabits New Zealand Defence Force land around Waiouru. It prefers open grassland habitat.

== Conservation status ==
This species has been classified as having the "At Risk, Naturally Uncommon" conservation status under the New Zealand Threat Classification System.
