= Rytidosperma pulchrum =

Conservation status
- Naturally Uncommon (NZ TCS)

Scientific classification
- Kingdom: Plantae
- Clade: Tracheophytes
- Clade: Angiosperms
- Clade: Monocots
- Clade: Commelinids
- Order: Poales
- Family: Poaceae
- Genus: Rytidosperma
- Species: R. pulchrum

Binomial name
- Rytidosperma pulchrum (Zotov) Connor & Edgar

Species of plant

Rytidosperma pulchrum is a species of true grass in the subfamily Danthonioideae. It is endemic to New Zealand and was described as Notodanthonia pulchra in 1963 by Russian-New Zealand botanist Victor Zotov.

== Distribution ==
R. pulchrum is endemic to New Zealand. In the North Island it is found on Taranaki Maunga, the mountains of the Central Volcanic Plateau, and the Kaimanawa, Ruahine and Tararua mountain ranges. In the South Island it is found in two locations in north-west Nelson (Haupiri Bog and Adelaine Tarn, in the Douglas Range).

The holotype was collected in 1944 by Victor Zotov at Waikamaka River, c. 1000 metres above sea level in the Ruahine Ranges, on a river terrace in light Nothofagus cliffortioides forest.

== Description ==
R. pulchrum forms small, densely tufted tussocks, sometimes rooting. It forms small panicles on 30 cm culms, each with a few spikelets on slender pedicels. The spikelets are 3-(5)-flowered, with awns exserted from glumes. The lemma have three rows of hairs, two on the lemma and one on the callus. The upper and lower rows of lemma hairs are continuous, the upper hairs slightly smaller than lemma lobes, and the lower row overlapping the upper. The central awn is 3-4.5 mm, similar in length to the palea and smaller than the upper lemma hairs. The palea is 3-3.8 mm, and smaller or equal to the upper lemma hairs. The callus has a few marginal hairs overlapping lower lemma hairs.

R. pulchrum is a diploid species with 2n = 24 chromosomes.

=== Identification ===
As a Rytidosperma, the easiest way to identify R. buchananii is to select a single floret (which will contain a single awn, two lateral lobes, and usually three rows of hairs - one on the callus and two on the lemma). The arrangement of the hairs, as well as the relative lengths of the awn, lateral lobes, sometimes the callus can help identify to species, using a key such as that found in the New Zealand Flora.

== Habitat ==
R. pulchrum is found in boggy places in subalpine and alpine zones.

On Ruapehu, near Turoa, R. pulchrum is described as growing in an alpine flush with fern Asplenium richardii and Polystichum cystostegium; the sedges, Carex acicularis, C. berggrenii, C. druceana, C. enysii, C. lachenalii subsp. parkeri, Isolepis caligenis; grasses, Poa lindsayi, and Rytidosperma nudum, and the herbs Cardamine mutabilis, and C. panatohea.

The holotype was described as growing on a river terrace in light Nothofagus cliffortioides forest.

On the desert road, R. pulchrum was described as living in grassy hollows, stream channels and valley-bottom open grassland amongst much denser shrubland and taller grassland.

== Threats ==
R. pulchrum is listed as Naturally Uncommon in the NZTCS. Its qualifiers are range restricted and sparse.

== Ecology ==
The caterpillars of the At Risk moth Orocrambus jansoni are believed to feed on R. pulchrum. Adult female moths were observed crawling out of R. pulchrum plants during surveys.

== Taxonomy ==
R. pulchrum is endemic to New Zealand and was described as Notodanthonia pulchra in 1963 by Russian-New Zealand botanist Victor Zotov.

The genus Notodanthonia was synonymised with Rytidosperma in Nicora (1973), after it was recognised that they referred to the same group. The genus Notodanthonia was only described in 1963 by Zotov, whereas Rytidosperma was described in 1854 by Steudel. As such, the older name Rytidosperma took priority under the International Code of Nomenclature.

In 1979, New Zealand botanists Henry Connor and Elizabeth Edgar moved the whole Notodanthonia genus to Rytidosperma, following Nicora (1973), and named the species Rytidosperma pulchrum.

=== Etymology ===
Rytidosperma: 'wrinkled seed' from the Greek 'rhytidos' = wrinkled and 'sperma' = seed

pulchrum: from the Latin 'pulcher' = beautiful.
