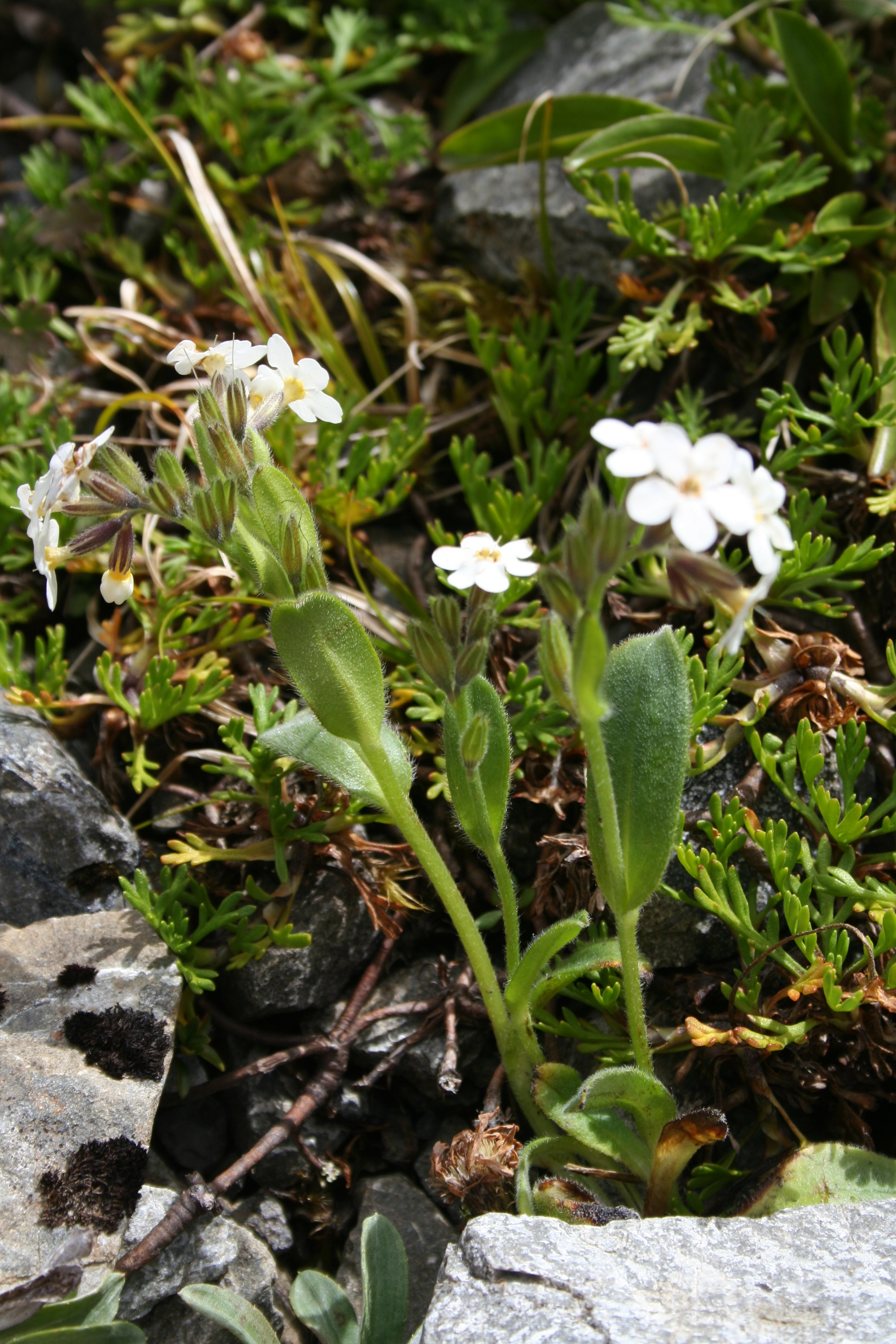
- Flowering plants of Myosotis explanata

Conservation status
- Naturally Uncommon (NZ TCS)

Scientific classification
- Kingdom: Plantae
- Clade: Tracheophytes
- Clade: Angiosperms
- Clade: Eudicots
- Clade: Asterids
- Order: Boraginales
- Family: Boraginaceae
- Genus: Myosotis
- Species: M. explanata

Binomial name
- Myosotis explanata Cheeseman

= Myosotis explanata =

Species of flowering plant

Myosotis explanata is a species of flowering plant in the family Boraginaceae, endemic to high-elevation habitats in the South Island of New Zealand. Thomas Cheeseman described the species in 1906. Plants of this species of forget-me-not are perennial rosettes with ebracteate inflorescences and white corollas with stamens that are partly exserted, with the tips of the anthers only surpassing the scales.

== Taxonomy and etymology ==
Myosotis explanata Cheeseman is in the plant family Boraginaceae. The species was originally described in 1906 by Thomas Cheeseman in his Manual of the New Zealand Flora. The most recent treatment of this species was done by Lucy B. Moore in the Flora of New Zealand.

The original specimens (syntypes) of Myosotis explanata were collected by Cheeseman and Leonard Cockayne in Arthurs Pass and Walkers Pass in the South Island, New Zealand, and are likely lodged the Auckland War Memorial Museum herbarium AK (e.g. AK 7460).

Myosotis explanata is similar morphologically to another South Island species, M. suavis. Lucy Moore distinguished the two species in her key using the following characters:

"Hairs crowded, soft; corolla c. 7 mm. diam........Myosotis suavis

Hairs sparse, rather stiff; corolla c. 10 mm. diam.....M. explanata"

== Phylogeny ==
Myosotis explanata was shown to be a part of the monophyletic southern hemisphere lineage of Myosotis in phylogenetic analyses of standard DNA sequencing markers (nuclear ribosomal DNA and chloroplast DNA regions) of New Zealand Myosotis. Within the southern hemisphere lineage, species relationships were not well resolved, and the placement of the sole individual sampled of M. explanata was also not well resolved.

== Description ==
Myosotis explanata plants are rosettes. The rosette leaves have broad petioles that are about as long as the leaf blades. The rosette leaves are 30–70 mm long by c. 15 mm wide (length: width ratio c. 2–4: 1), and the leaf blade is obovate to linear-spathulate, widest at or above the middle, with an obtuse, rounded apex. Both surfaces of the leaf are uniformly and sparsely to densely covered in patent to erect hairs. The upper surface of the leaf has densely distributed antrorse (forward-facing) hairs whereas on the lower surface the hairs are not as densely distributed and retrorse (backward-facing). Each rosette has several ascending to erect, ebracteate inflorescences that are up to 200 mm long and mostly unbranched. The cauline leaves are similar to the rosette leaves, but are smaller sessile, become smaller toward the top of the inflorescence, narrow-elliptic, and acuminate, and have hairs similar to the rosette leaves. The flowers are many per inflorescence, and each is borne on a short pedicel, without a bract. The calyx is c. 10 mm long at flowering and fruiting, lobed to one-half of its length, and with some patent to erect hairs, some of which are hooked, as well as retrorse hairs near the base. The corolla is white and can reach 10 mm in diameter, with a cylindrical tube, and small scales alternating with the petals. The anthers are partly exserted, with the anther tips only surpassing the faucal scales. The nutlets are c. 2.5 mm long.

The pollen of Myosotis explanata is unknown.

The chromosome number of M. explanata is unknown.

Flowering November–January and fruiting January–April.

== Distribution and habitat ==
Myosotis explanata is a forget-me-not that occurs in high-elevation habitats in along the main divide in Canterbury and Westland, South Island.

== Conservation status ==
Myosotis explanata is listed as At Risk - Naturally Uncommon with the qualifiers "DP" (Data Poor), "EF" (Extreme Fluctuations), and "RR" (Range Restricted) on the most recent assessment (2017-2018) under the New Zealand Threatened Classification system for plants.

== Gallery ==
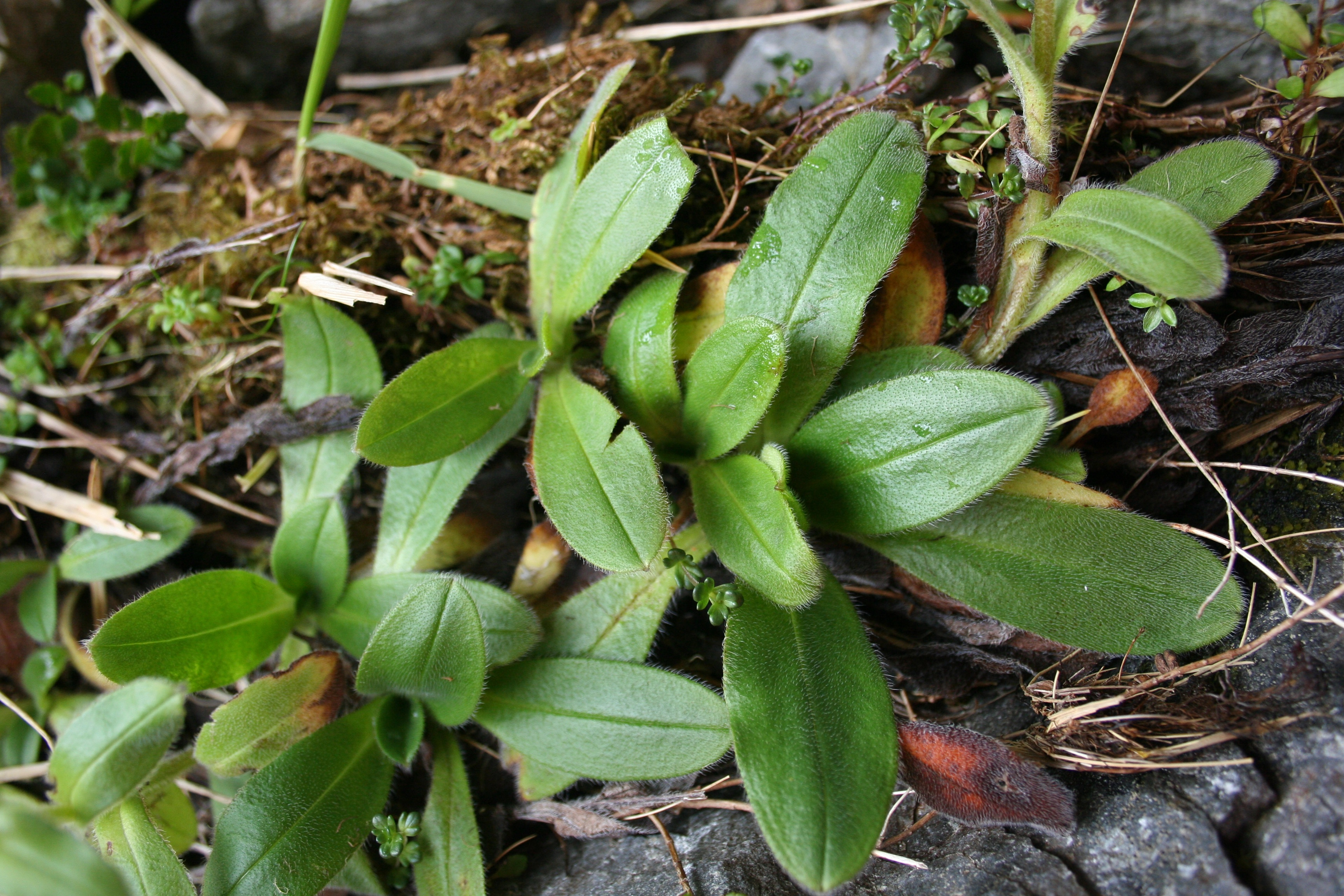
Rosettes

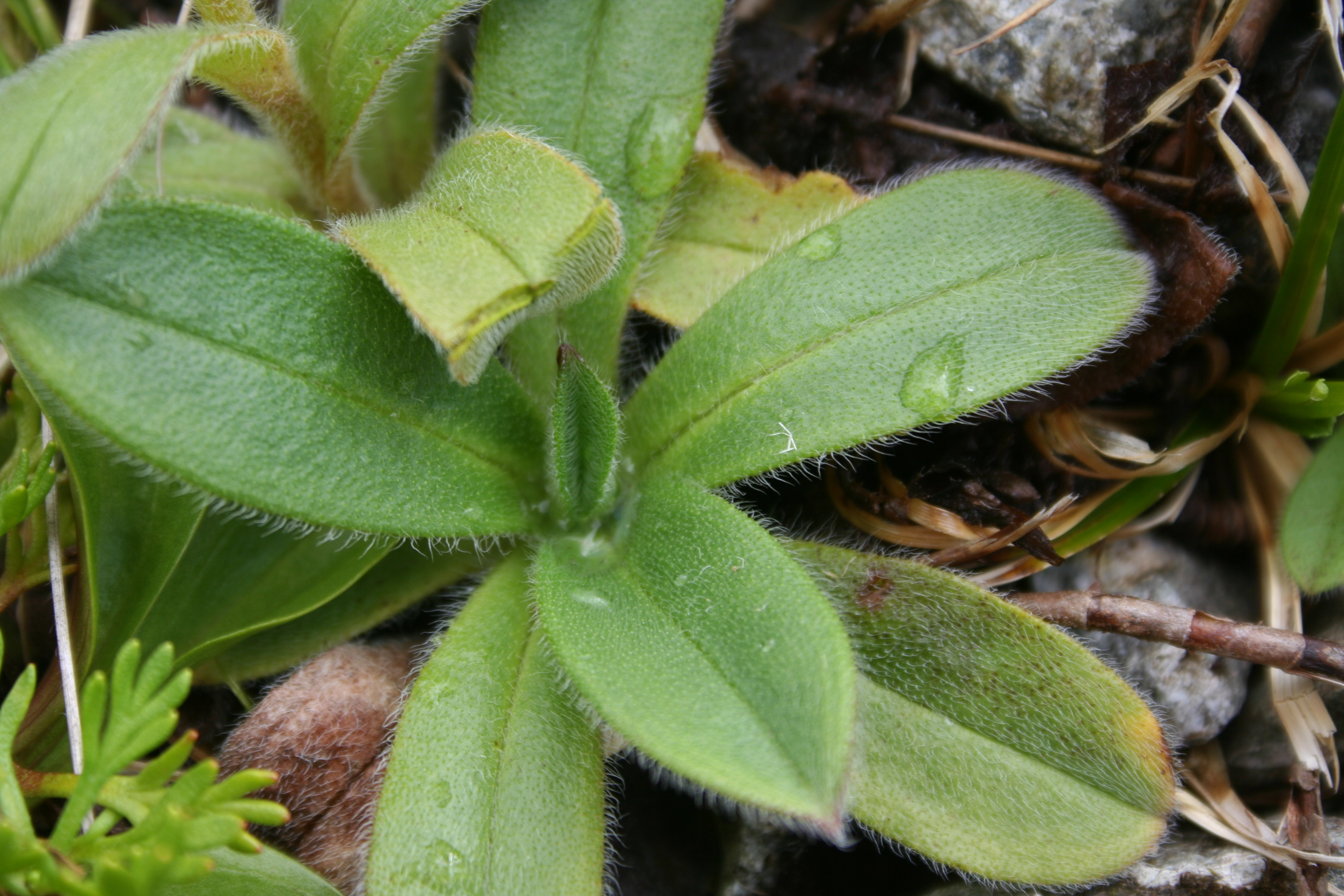
Rosette

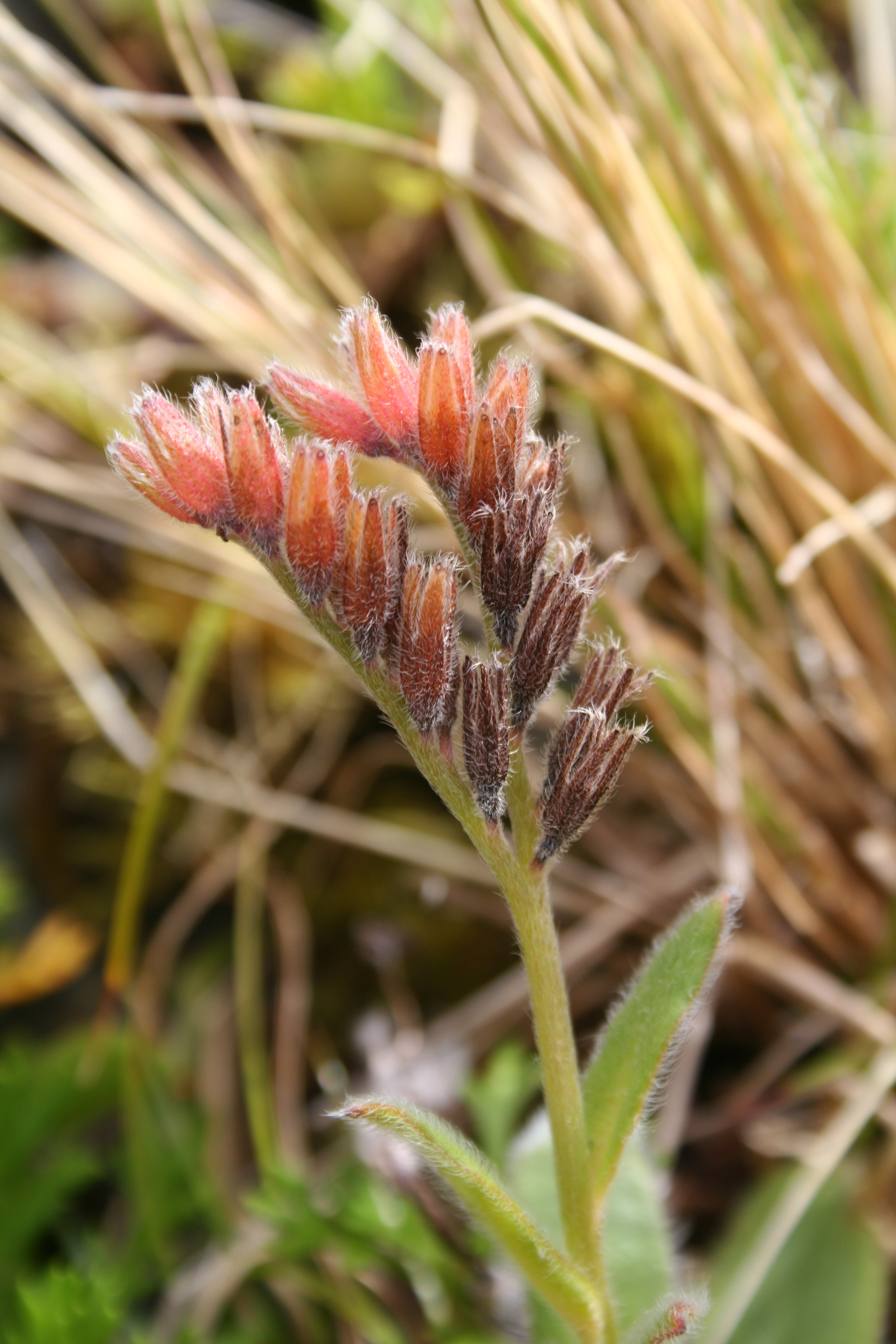
Fruiting plant
