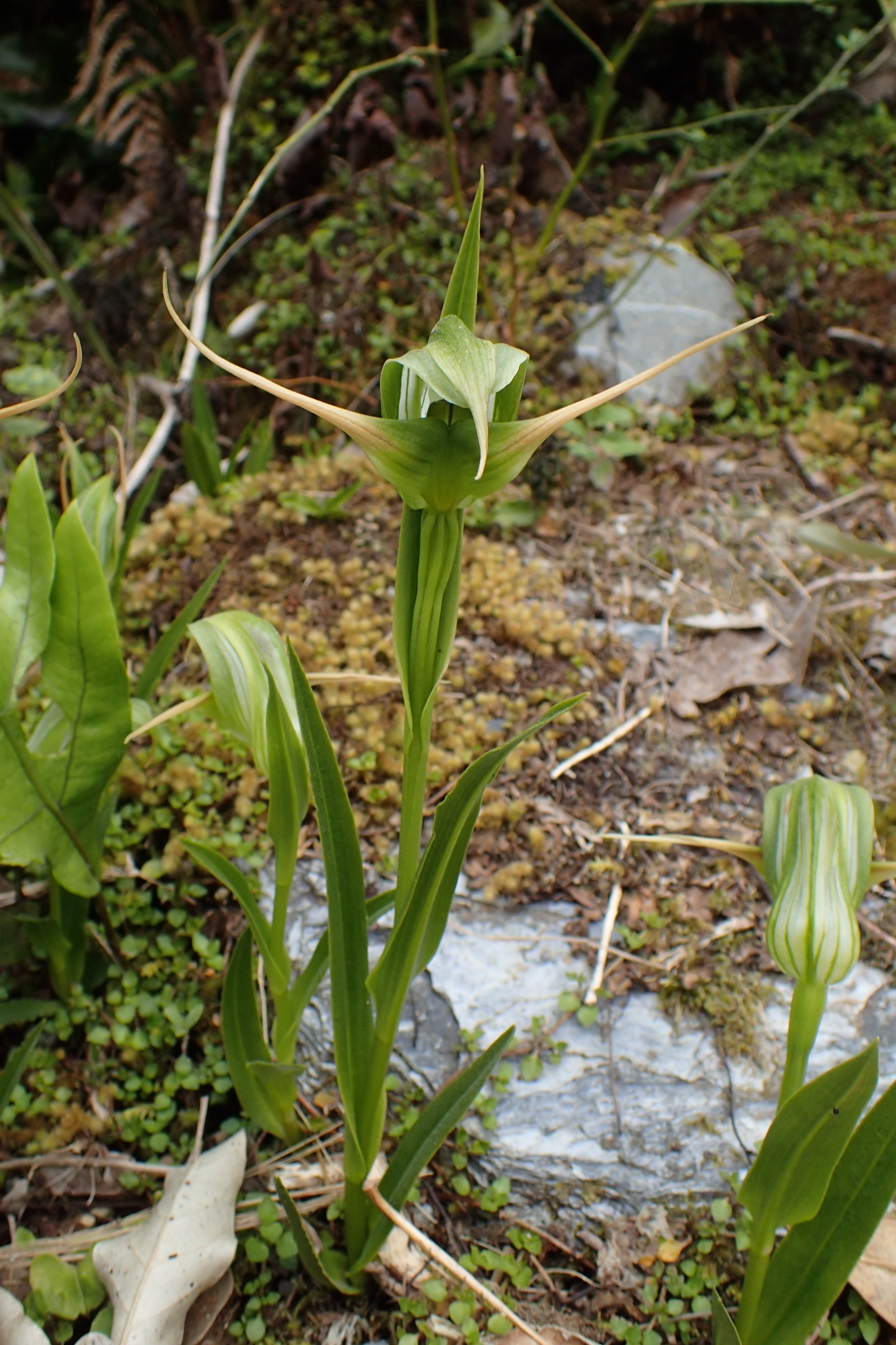
- Pterostylis australis near Franz Josef Glacier, Westland (New Zealand)

Scientific classification
- Kingdom: Plantae
- Clade: Tracheophytes
- Clade: Angiosperms
- Clade: Monocots
- Order: Asparagales
- Family: Orchidaceae
- Subfamily: Orchidoideae
- Tribe: Cranichideae
- Genus: Pterostylis
- Species: P. australis

Binomial name
- Pterostylis australis Hook.f.

= Pterostylis australis =

Southern greenhood

Species of orchid

Pterostylis australis, commonly known as the southern greenhood, is a species of orchid endemic to New Zealand. Unlike many other greenhood orchids, this species lacks a rosette of leaves but instead only has leaves on the flowering stem. The leaf's shape differs according to it position on the stem and there is a single green and white-striped flower. This greenhood occurs on both of the main islands of New Zealand and often forms large colonies.

== Description ==
Pterostylis australis is a terrestrial, perennial, deciduous, herb with an underground tuber and has between three and six leaves on the flowering stem. The leaves are 40–150 mm (2–6 in) long, 10–15 mm (0.4–0.6 in) wide, elliptic near the base trending to lance-shaped near the top of the stem. The flowering stem is 100–250 mm (4–10 in) tall and none of the leaves is taller than the single green and white-striped flower. The dorsal sepal and petals are fused, forming a hood or "galea" over the column. The dorsal sepal has a long-tapering, down-curved tip. The lateral sepals turn backwards and away from each other. The labellum is curved, dark green, reddish near the tip and arched along its mid-line. Flowering occurs from November to January.

== Taxonomy and naming ==
Pterostylis australis was first formally described in 1853 by Joseph Dalton Hooker and the description was published in The Botany of the Antarctic Voyage of H.M. Discovery Ships Erebus and Terror in the years 1839–1843, under the Command of Captain Sir James Clark Ross. The specific epithet (australis) is a Latin word meaning "south".

== Distribution and habitat ==
This greenhood grows in scrub and tall forest, especially of Nothofagus. It occurs on both the North and South Islands of New Zealand as well as on Stewart Island. On the North Island, it only occurs south from near the East Cape and only on higher peaks.
