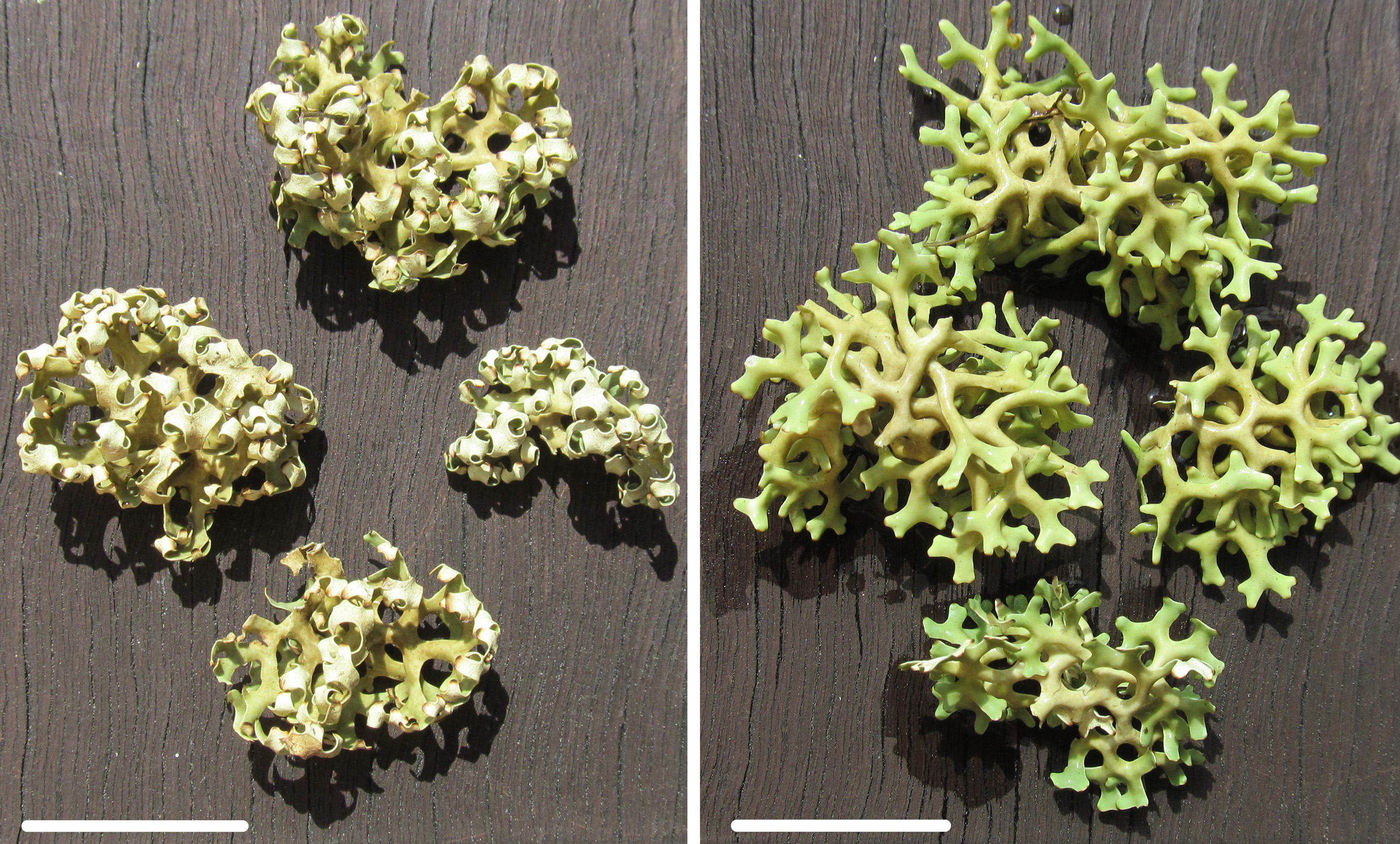
- Comparison of dry and wet form

Conservation status
- Declining (NZ TCS)

Scientific classification
- Kingdom: Fungi
- Division: Ascomycota
- Class: Lecanoromycetes
- Order: Lecanorales
- Family: Parmeliaceae
- Genus: Xanthoparmelia
- Species: X. semiviridis

Binomial name
- Xanthoparmelia semiviridis (F.Muell. ex Nyl.) O.Blanco, Ana Crespo, Elix, D.Hawksw. & Lumbsch)

Synonyms
- Chondropsis semiviridis; Parmeliopsis semiviridis

= Xanthoparmelia semiviridis =

Resurrection lichen

Species of lichen

Xanthoparmelia semiviridis, also known as resurrection lichen, is a foliose lichen species in the family Parmeliaceae. Its common name comes from the reaction of a dry sample to moisture. In its dry state it appears like curled-up dry leaf litter on the ground, but after rainfall the lichen will quickly recover, unfurl and become darker in colour. It is found in semi-arid areas across southern Australia and the South Island of New Zealand. The species is in decline in New Zealand because of the loss of habitat resulting from the establishment of dairy farms and vineyards in former indigenous habitat, and the deterioration of existing habitat caused by invasive species such as hawkweeds.

== Taxonomy ==
It was first formally described as a new species in 1863 by Ferdinand von Mueller and given the name Parmeliopsis semiviridis, based on a specimen collected by Robert Brown from Table Mountain, Australia. It was moved in 1879 to the genus Chondropsis by James Crombie, before being placed in Xanthoparmelia in a 2004 revision of the genus based on DNA. Its specific epithet, "semiviridis", is from the Latin semi (half or partially) and viridis (green).

== Description ==
Xanthoparmelia semiviridis is a rare exception amongst Xanthoparmelia species in that it grows unattached to any substrate. The thalli have no rhizines to anchor its lower surface. In dry conditions, it rolls up into a ball that can be up to 30 millimetres (1.2 in) in diameter, and can be blown about in the wind. When it becomes wet, the ball unrolls and changes to a foliose form with dichotomous branches, and becomes darker in colour. Although it rarely fruits, specimens with mature and immature fruits are occasionally seen.

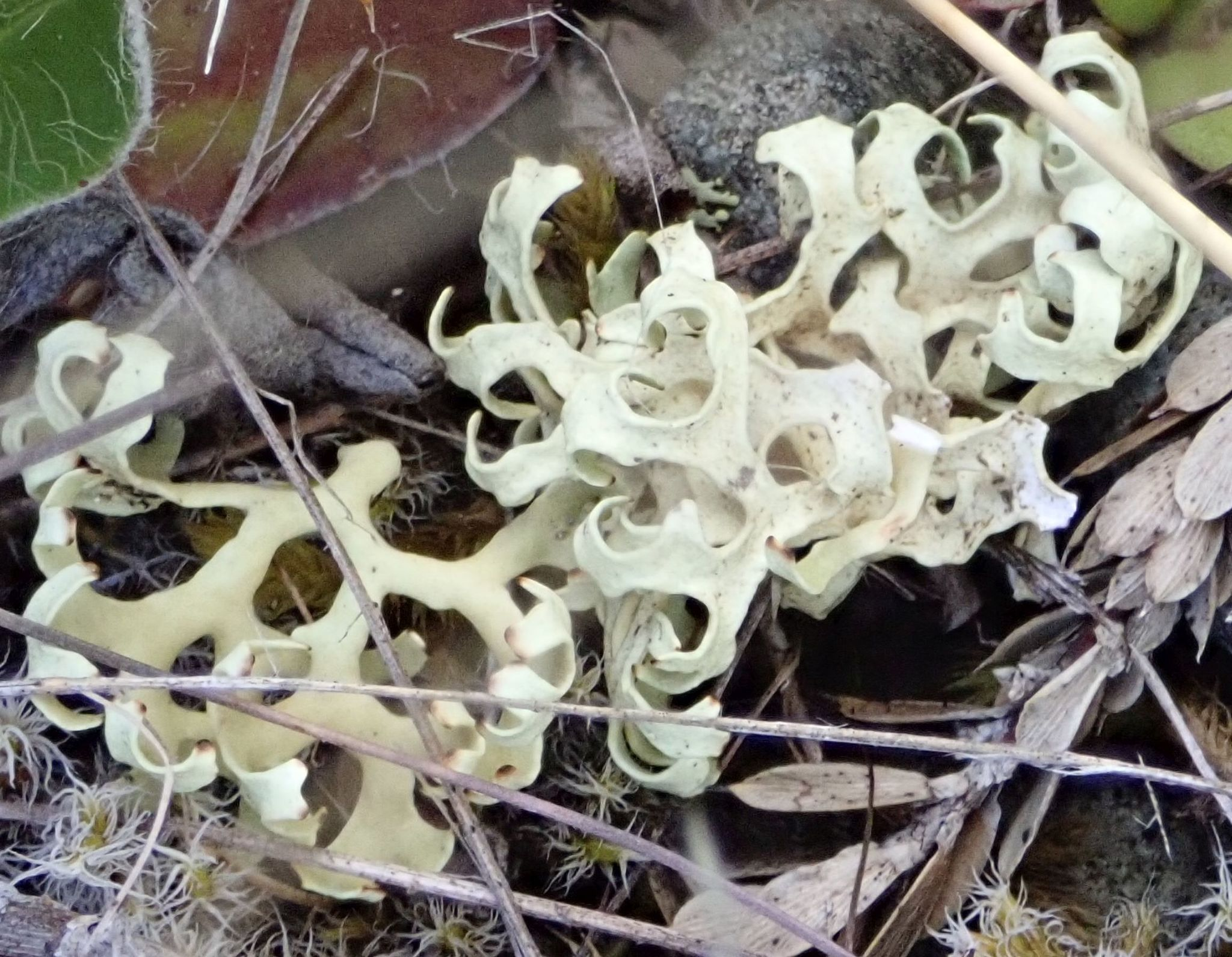

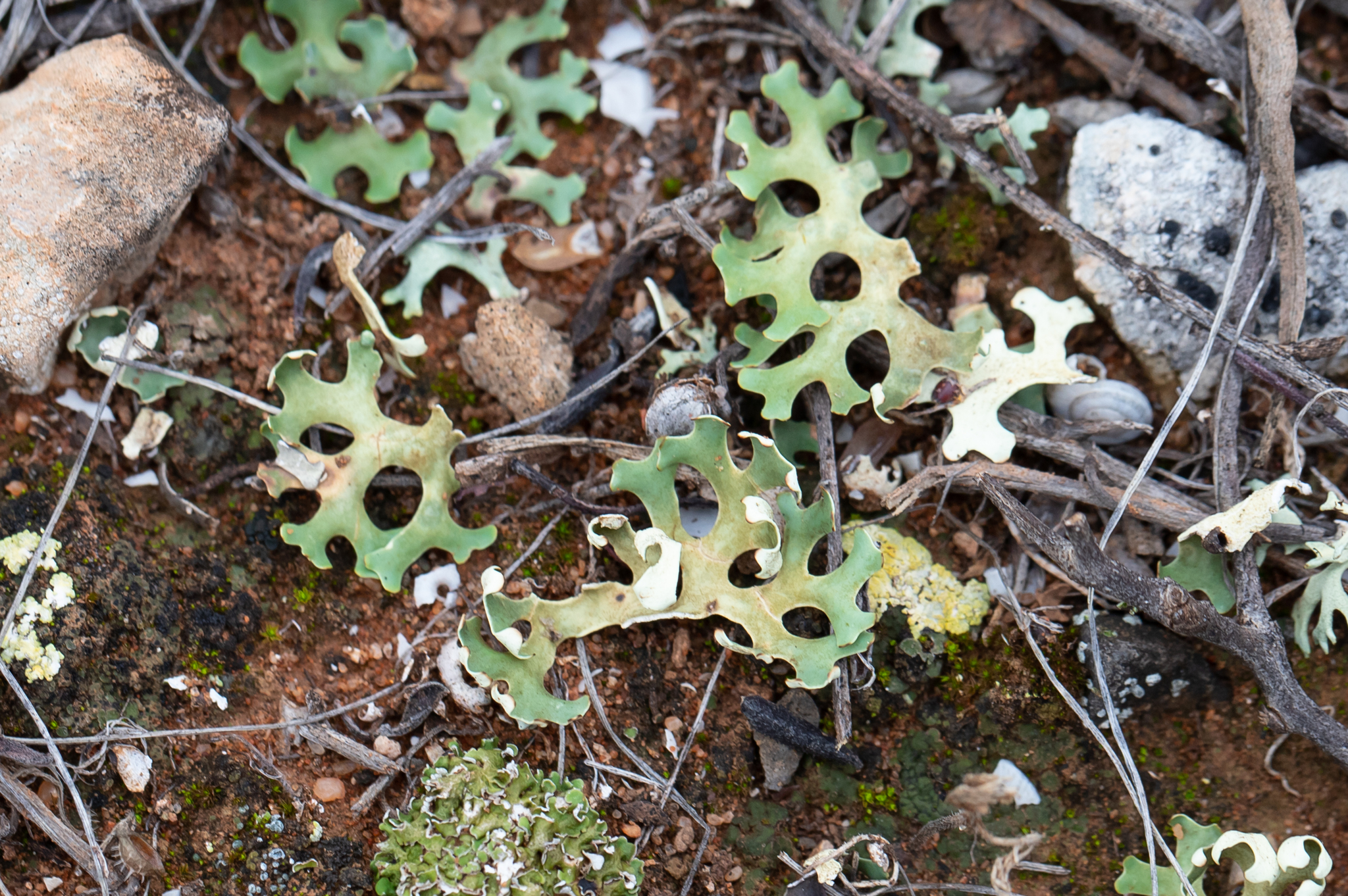

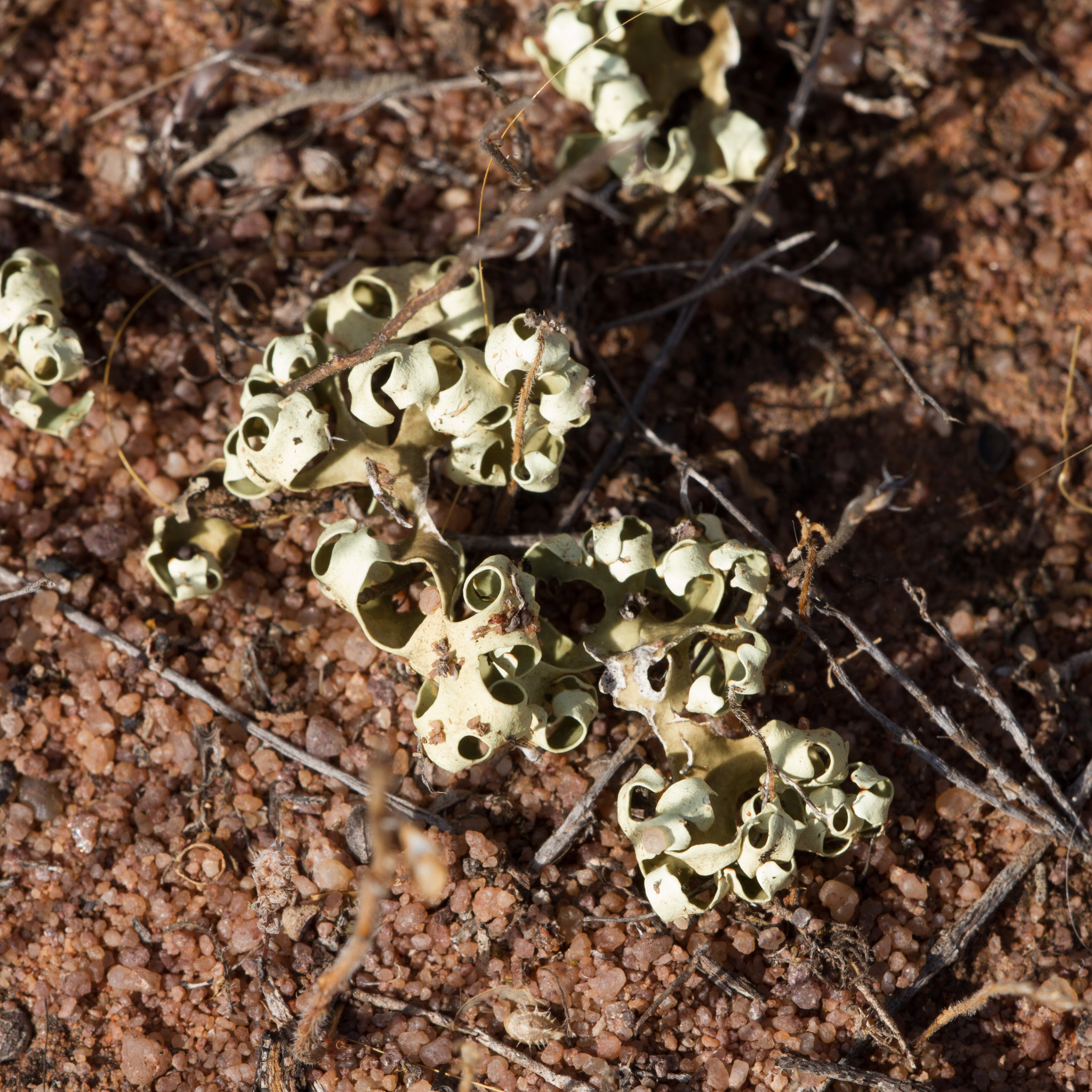

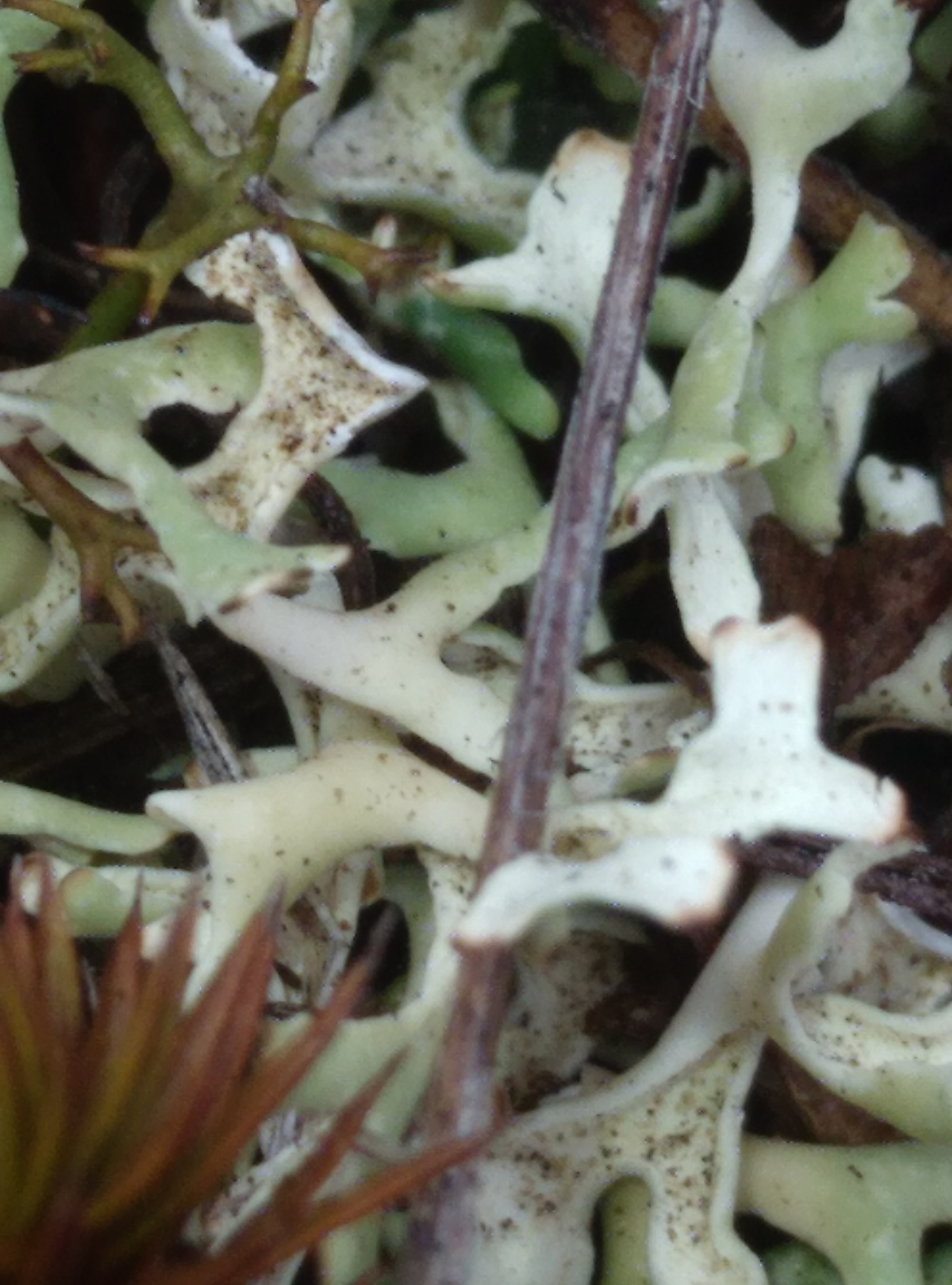

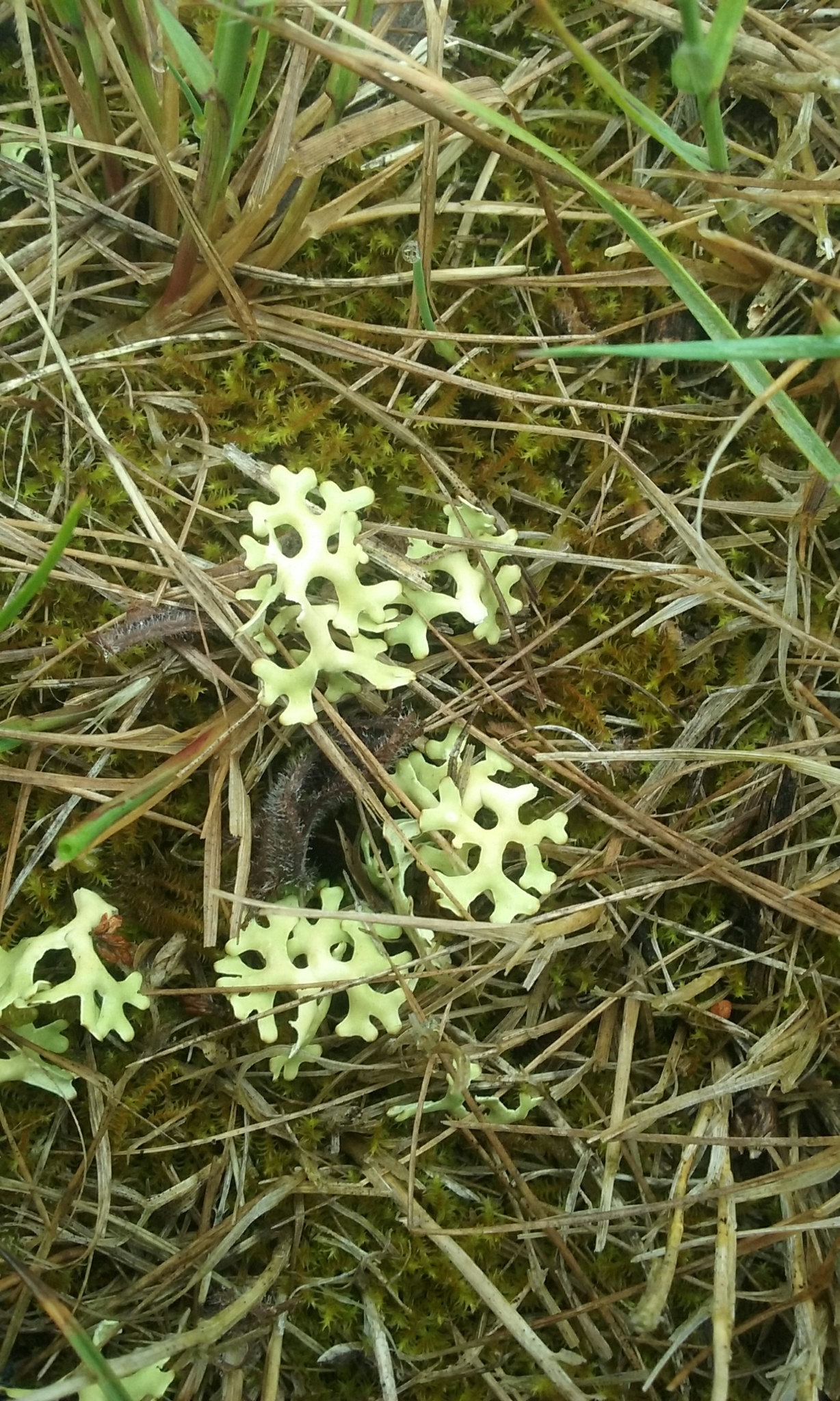

== Distribution ==
Xanthoparmelia semiviridis is found in regions across the south of Australia from Western Australia to New South Wales, in semi-arid areas where there is some winter rainfall. It is also found in the South Island of New Zealand, in the Molesworth area (Marlborough region), the Balmoral and Mackenzie Country area of Canterbury, and also in Central Otago.

== Conservation status ==
Xanthoparmelia semiviridis is classified as "At Risk - Declining" by the New Zealand Department of Conservation. The species is in decline in New Zealand because of the loss of habitat resulting from the establishment of dairy farms and vineyards in former indigenous habitat, and the deterioration of existing habitat caused by invasive species such as hawkweeds (Pilosella spp.).

== See also ==
- List of Xanthoparmelia species
