= Donald Petrie (botanist) =

New Zealand botanist, teacher and school inspector (1846–1925)

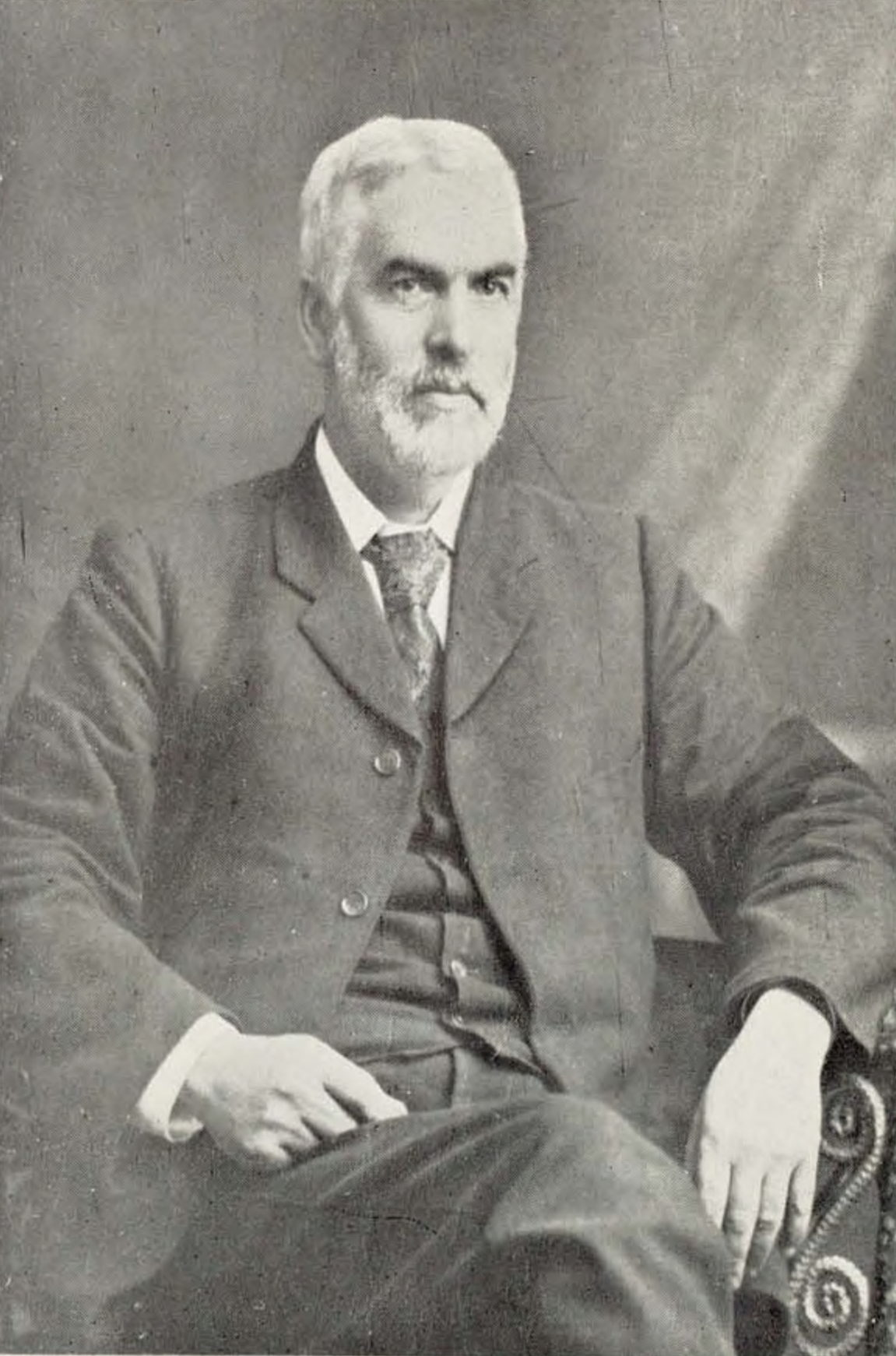
- Born: 7 September 1846; Moray, Scotland
- Died: 1 September 1925 (aged 78); Auckland, New Zealand
- Occupation: Botanist

Donald Petrie (7 September 1846 – 1 September 1925) was a Scottish botanist noted for his work in New Zealand.

Petrie was born in the parish of Edinkillie, Moray, on 7 September 1846 and educated at Aberdeen Grammar School and the University of Aberdeen.

He taught at the Glasgow Free Church Training College, the Glasgow Academy and Scotch College in Melbourne, Australia, before being appointed inspector of schools with the provincial government in Otago, New Zealand, in October 1873.

An active member of the Otago Institute, Petrie was elected a fellow of the Linnean Society of London (1886) and served as president of the Auckland Institute (1896). He was one of the 20 original fellows of the New Zealand Institute in 1911 and held several positions there, including council member, member of the board of governors, and president in 1915.

He died in 1925.

== Species named in Petrie's honour ==
- Carmichaelia petriei

== Abbreviation ==
The standard author abbreviation Petrie is used to indicate this person as the author when citing a botanical name.
