= B. lepidus =

B. lepidus may refer to:

- Bombus lepidus, a bumblebee species in the genus Bombus
- Bromus lepidus, a grass species in the genus Bromus

== See also ==
- Lepidus (disambiguation)
