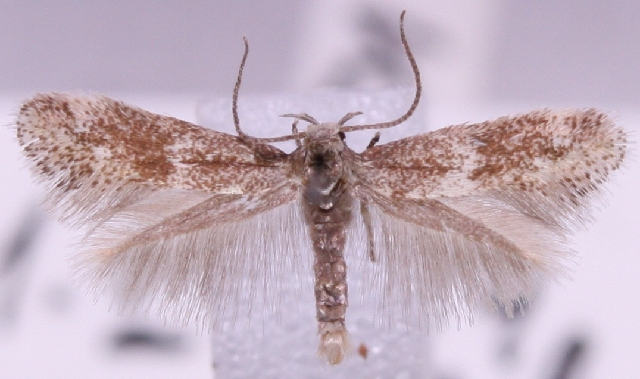

Scientific classification
- Kingdom: Animalia
- Phylum: Arthropoda
- Class: Insecta
- Order: Lepidoptera
- Family: Elachistidae
- Genus: Elachista
- Species: E. herrichii

Binomial name
- Elachista herrichii Frey, 1859

Synonyms
- Elachista reuttiana Frey, 1859; Poeciloptilia obscurella Herrich-Schäffer, 1855; Elachista obscurella (Herrich-Schäffer, 1855)

= Elachista herrichii =

Species of moth

Elachista herrichii is a moth of the family Elachistidae. It is found from the Baltic region to the Pyrenees, Italy and Romania.

The larvae feed on Agrostis, Bromus pannonicus, Festuca arvernensis, Holcus, Koeleria glauca and Koeleria macrantha. They mine the leaves of their host plant. Larvae can be found from autumn to April or May and again from July to early August.
