= Bromus pacificus =

Scientific classification
- Kingdom: Plantae
- Clade: Tracheophytes
- Clade: Angiosperms
- Clade: Monocots
- Clade: Commelinids
- Order: Poales
- Family: Poaceae
- Subfamily: Pooideae
- Genus: Bromus
- Species: B. pacificus

Binomial name
- Bromus pacificus Shear

Species of grass

Bromus pacificus, the Pacific brome, is a perennial grass native to the Pacific coast of North America. Bromus pacificus has a diploid number of 28.

== Taxonomy ==
Bromus pacificus is often misidentified as various species of Bromus sect. Ceratochloa, including B. carinatus and B. sitchensis. B. pacificus resembles these species with its large and open panicles, but its lemmas are rounded or slightly keeled as compared to the flattened lemmas of B. sect. Ceratochloa. In addition, B. pacificus typically occurs only near the coast of British Columbia while species of B. sect. Ceratochloa are more widely distributed, including habitats in California where B. pacificus has been misidentified.

== Description ==
Bromus pacificus lacks rhizomes and grows 45–172 cm (18–68 in) tall. The smooth culms are 4–5 mm (0.16–0.20 in) wide at their base and have five to nine nodes. The brownish culms are relatively pubescent, with hairs up to 1 mm (0.039 in) long, though culms are occasionally glabrous with hairs only adjacent to nodes. The leaf sheaths remain closed for most of their length, being open for only 14–35 mm (0.55–1.38 in). Leaf sheaths are glabrous or pilose with hairs 2.1 mm (0.083 in) long, and lack auricles. The membranous and glabrous ligules are 2–4 mm (0.079–0.157 in) long. Leaf blades are 32–37 cm (13–15 in) long and 7–16 mm (0.28–0.63 in) wide, with an adaxial surface covered with hairs up to 1.5 mm (0.059 in) long and a glabrous abaxial surface. Margins are smooth or slightly serrated. The open panicles are 17–28 cm (6.7–11.0 in) long and 12.5–19 cm (4.9–7.5 in) wide, with spreading or nodding branches. The spikelets are 2.1–3.8 cm (0.83–1.50 in) long and number one to six per branch. The rachillas can sometimes be visible at maturity. Spikelets have six to eight florets. Glumes are pubescent, with hairs up to 0.6 mm (0.024 in) long. The one-nerved lower glumes are 8.2–10.5 mm (0.32–0.41 in) long, and the three-nerved upper glumes are 9.7–12 mm (0.38–0.47 in) long. The seven-nerved lemmas are 10–13.5 mm (0.39–0.53 in) long and 1.8–2.3 mm (0.071–0.091 in) wide, and are covered with appressed hairs up to 1.5 mm (0.059 in) long. Awns are 3–6.5 mm (0.12–0.26 in) long. Paleas are typically shorter than lemmas, being 9–10 mm (0.35–0.39 in) long, with dense cilia up to 0.5 mm (0.020 in) long. The dark brown anthers are 2–3 mm (0.079–0.118 in) long.

== Distribution and habitat ==
Bromus pacificus occurs along the Pacific coast as its specific epithet indicates. It occurs from southeastern Alaska down to central Oregon; most often it occurs in the coast of British Columbia. Habitats include moist ravines, shaded forests, wet thickets, saline beaches, ditches, and road verges, from 0–50 m (0–164 ft) in elevation.
