= Bromus aleutensis =

Scientific classification
- Kingdom: Plantae
- Clade: Tracheophytes
- Clade: Angiosperms
- Clade: Monocots
- Clade: Commelinids
- Order: Poales
- Family: Poaceae
- Subfamily: Pooideae
- Genus: Bromus
- Species: B. aleutensis

Binomial name
- Bromus aleutensis Trin. ex Griseb.

Species of flowering plant

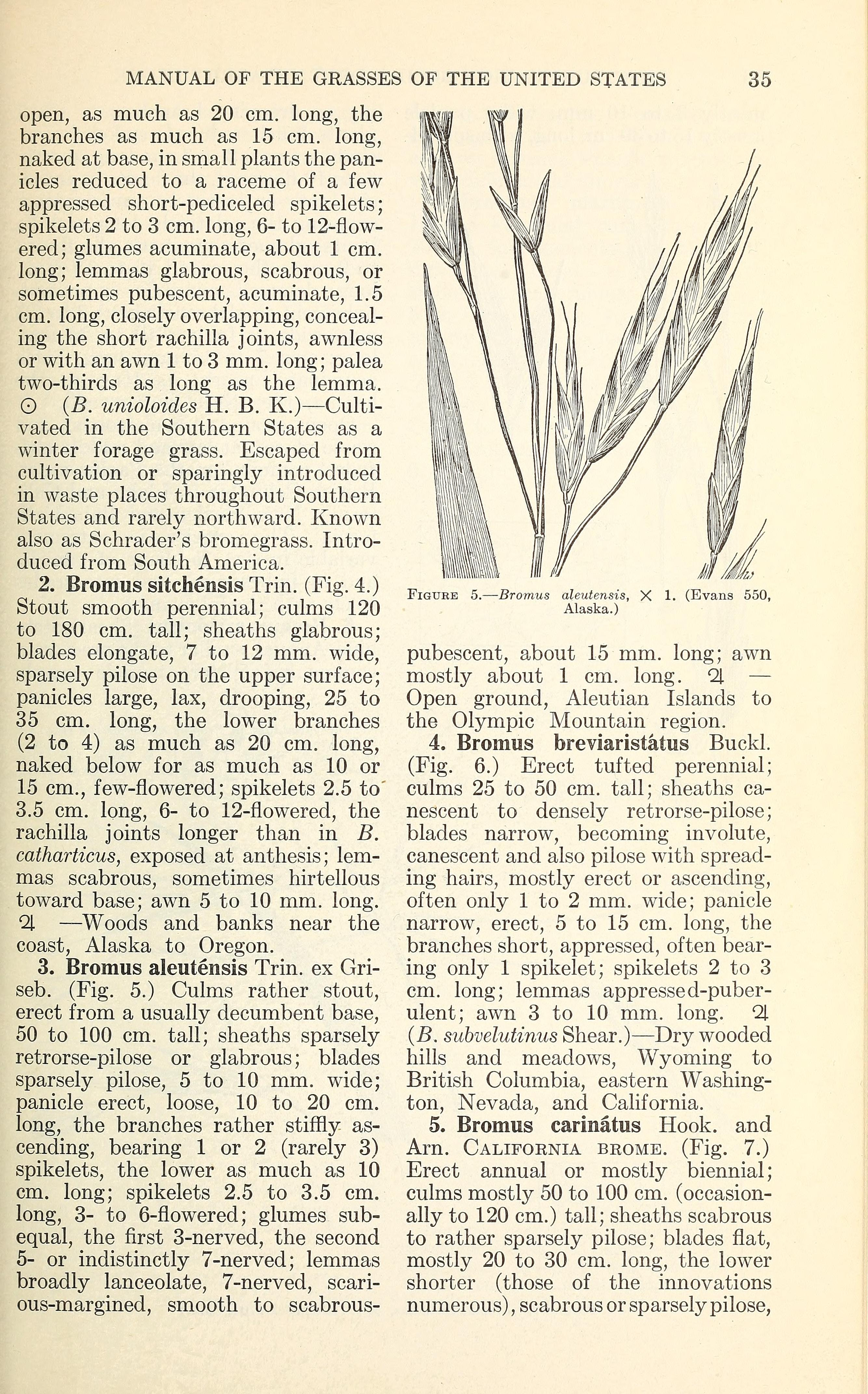
A drawing of Bromus aleutensis found in Manual of the Grasses of the United States.

Bromus aleutensis, commonly known as the Aleutian brome, is a perennial grass found in North America. B. aleutensis has a diploid number of 56.

== Taxonomy ==
It has been suggested that Bromus aleutensis may be a modified version of the similar Bromus sitchensis in which reproduction occurs at an earlier developmental state as a response to the climate of the Aleutian Islands. In addition, while B. aleutensis is mostly self-fertilizing and B. sitchensis is mostly outcrossing, anther lengths close to 4.2 mm (0.17 in) in some individuals of B. aleutensis suggests outcrossing.

== Description ==
B aleutensis is a perennial grass that is loosely cespitose. The decumbent culms are 40–130 cm (16–51 in) tall and 3–7 mm (0.12–0.28 in) thick. The striate and pilose leaf sheaths have dense hairs. Auricles are rarely present. The glabrous ligules are 3.5–5 mm (0.14–0.20 in) long. The somewhat pilose leaf blades are 13–35 cm (5.1–13.8 in) long and 6–15 mm (0.24–0.59 in) wide. The open panicles are 10–28 cm (3.9–11.0 in) long. Lower branches of the inflorescence are 10 cm (3.9 in) long and number one to two per node, with two to three spikelets on their distal half. The elliptic to lanceolate spikelets are 25–40 mm (0.98–1.57 in) long, with three to six florets. The glumes are glabrous or pubescent, with the three- to five-veined lower glumes being 9–13 mm (0.35–0.51 in) and the seven- to nine-veined upper glumes being 10–15 mm (0.39–0.59 in). The lanceolate lemmas are 12–17 mm (0.47–0.67 in) and are laterally compressed and softly pubescent. The lemmas have nine to eleven veins, with the veins being especially conspicuous distally. The awns are 5–10 mm (0.20–0.39 in) and the anthers are 2.2–4.2 mm (0.087–0.165 in).

== Habitat and distribution ==
Bromus aleutensis grows in sand, gravel, and disturbed soil in the Pacific coast, particularly from the Aleutian Islands (as its specific epithet indicates) to western Washington, though it has been found farther east in lake shores or road edges of Canada and Idaho.

== Ecology ==
Bromus aleutensis is infected by Fusarium nivale and Hendersonia culmicola.
