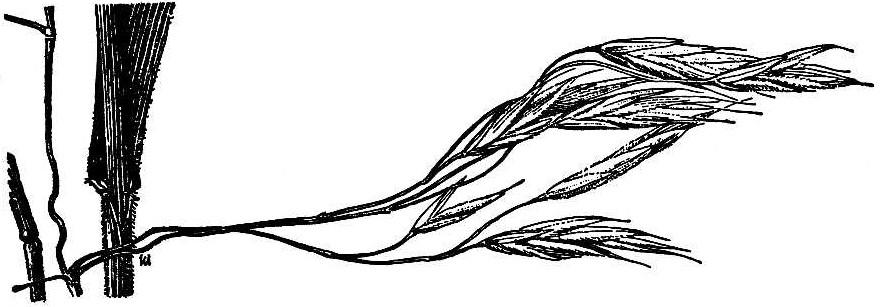

Scientific classification
- Kingdom: Plantae
- Clade: Tracheophytes
- Clade: Angiosperms
- Clade: Monocots
- Clade: Commelinids
- Order: Poales
- Family: Poaceae
- Subfamily: Pooideae
- Genus: Bromus
- Species: B. grandis

Binomial name
- Bromus grandis (Shear) Hitchc.

= Bromus grandis =

Species of flowering plant

Bromus grandis is a species of brome grass known by the common name tall brome.

It is native to California and Baja California, where it grows in many types of habitat from forest to coastal scrub.

== Description ==
Bromus grandis is a perennial bunchgrass growing up to 1.5 metres (5 feet) tall. It has hairy leaves and open inflorescences of fuzzy flat spikelets.

It is related to Bromus orcuttianus, which shares its range.
