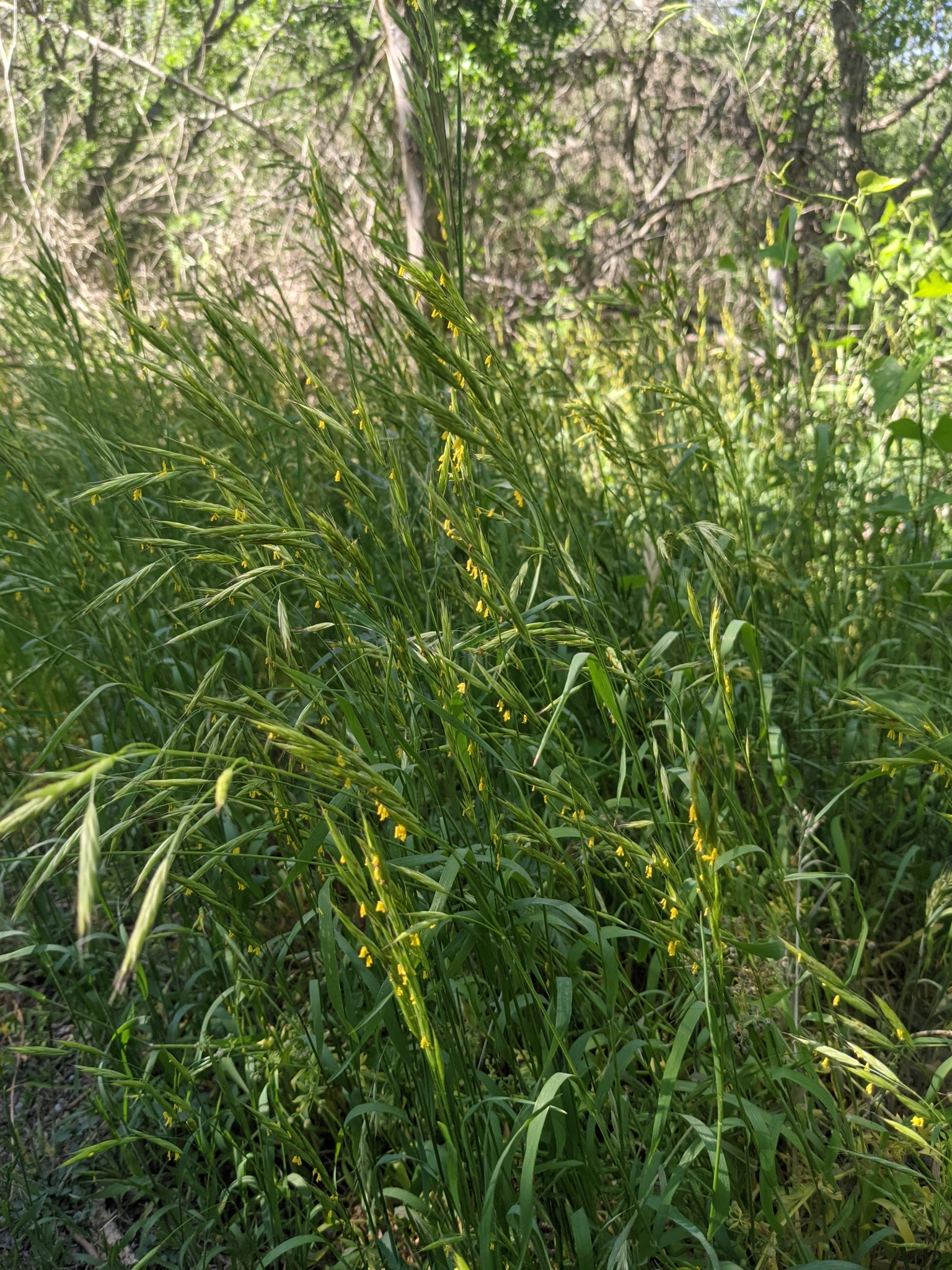

Scientific classification
- Kingdom: Plantae
- Clade: Tracheophytes
- Clade: Angiosperms
- Clade: Monocots
- Clade: Commelinids
- Order: Poales
- Family: Poaceae
- Subfamily: Pooideae
- Genus: Bromus
- Species: B. texensis

Binomial name
- Bromus texensis (Shear) Hitchc.

Synonyms
- Bromus purgans var. texensis

= Bromus texensis =

Species of grass

Bromus texensis, the Texas brome, is an annual grass native to Texas.

== Description ==
The culms of Bromus texensis reach a height of 30–75 cm (12–30 in) in a spreading or erect fashion. The culms have three to five nodes with downward hairs. The leaves are hairy (pubescent to pilose), measuring 7–20 cm (2.8–7.9 in) long and 3–7 mm wide. The ligules of the leaves are 2–3 mm long with hairs on their back.

The inflorescence is an erect or drooping panicle, 8–15 cm (3.1–5.9 in) long. The branches of the panicle are smooth and hairless, growing up to 9 cm (3.5 in) long. The spikelets are 2–3 cm (0.79–1.18 in) long and have four to seven minuscule florets. The first glume is 6–9 mm long with a single nerve, and the second glume is 8–10.5 mm long with three nerves. The lemmas are 9–15 mm long, with three or seven nerves. The lemmas are olive green and smooth, sometimes rough on their margins. The palea is shorter than the lemma and has rough nerves.

Bromus texensis is the only grass in section Bromopsis that is a true annual.

== Distribution and habitat ==
Bromus texensis is restricted to central and south-east Texas, occurring on rocky soils in Bexar, Duval, Goliad, Nueces, and Travis counties. The type locality is in Bexar county, and only one collection of the species has been made in the others. Although one specimen has been reported from Mexico, it was later discovered to be Bromus anomalus.
