= B. vulgaris =

B. vulgaris may refer to:

- Bambusa vulgaris, an open clump type bamboo species
- Barbarea vulgaris, the bittercress, a biennial herb species
- Berberis vulgaris, the European barberry, a shrub species
- Beta vulgaris, the beet, a plant species
- Bromus vulgaris, the Columbia brome, a grass species native to western North America
- Byblia vulgaris, a butterfly species found in western Africa

== See also ==
- Vulgaris (disambiguation)
