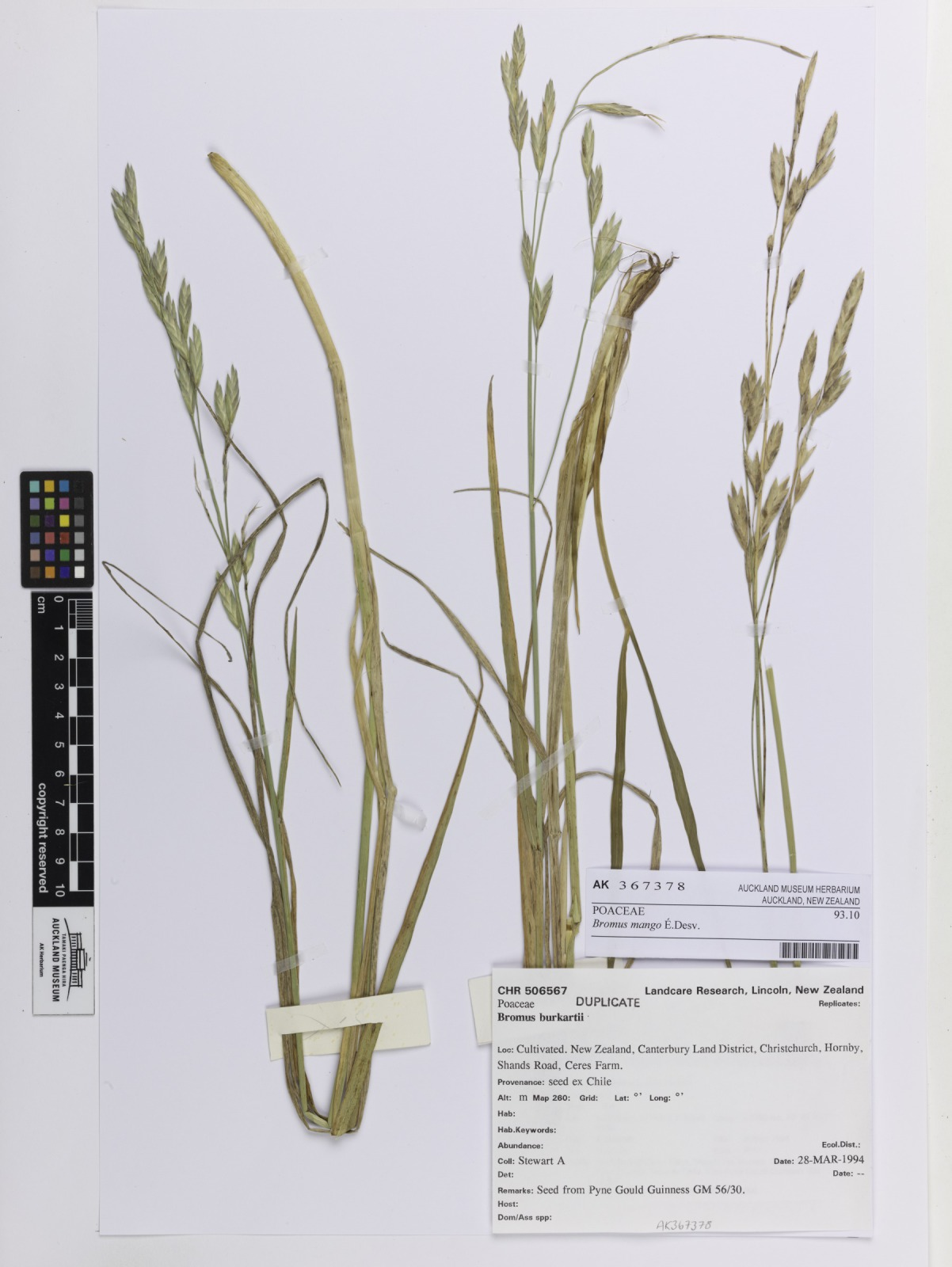
- Herbarium specimen

Scientific classification
- Kingdom: Plantae
- Clade: Tracheophytes
- Clade: Angiosperms
- Clade: Monocots
- Clade: Commelinids
- Order: Poales
- Family: Poaceae
- Subfamily: Pooideae
- Genus: Bromus
- Species: B. mango

Binomial name
- Bromus mango É.Desv.

Synonyms
- Bromus burkartii Muñoz; Ceratochloa mango (É.Desv.) Holub

= Bromus mango =

Species of plant

Bromus mango is a species of flowering plant in the broom tribe Bromeae, family Poaceae, native to central and southern Chile and southern Argentina. A biennial, it is believed to have been cultivated as a food crop by indigenous peoples of the area.
