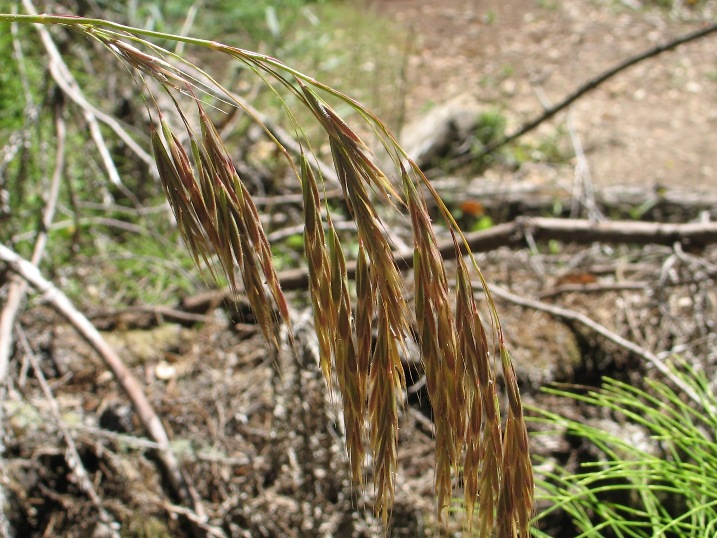

Conservation status
- Secure (NatureServe)

Scientific classification
- Kingdom: Plantae
- Clade: Tracheophytes
- Clade: Angiosperms
- Clade: Monocots
- Clade: Commelinids
- Order: Poales
- Family: Poaceae
- Subfamily: Pooideae
- Genus: Bromus
- Species: B. laevipes

Binomial name
- Bromus laevipes Shear

= Bromus laevipes =

Species of flowering plant

Bromus laevipes is a species of brome grass known by the common name Chinook brome.

It is native to western North America from Washington to Baja California, where it grows in many types of habitat.

== Description ==
It is a perennial grass which may exceed 1.5 meters in height. The leaf blades may be nearly 2 centimeters wide at the bases. The inflorescence is an open array of spikelets, the lower ones drooping or nodding. The spikelets are flattened and usually hairy or downy.
