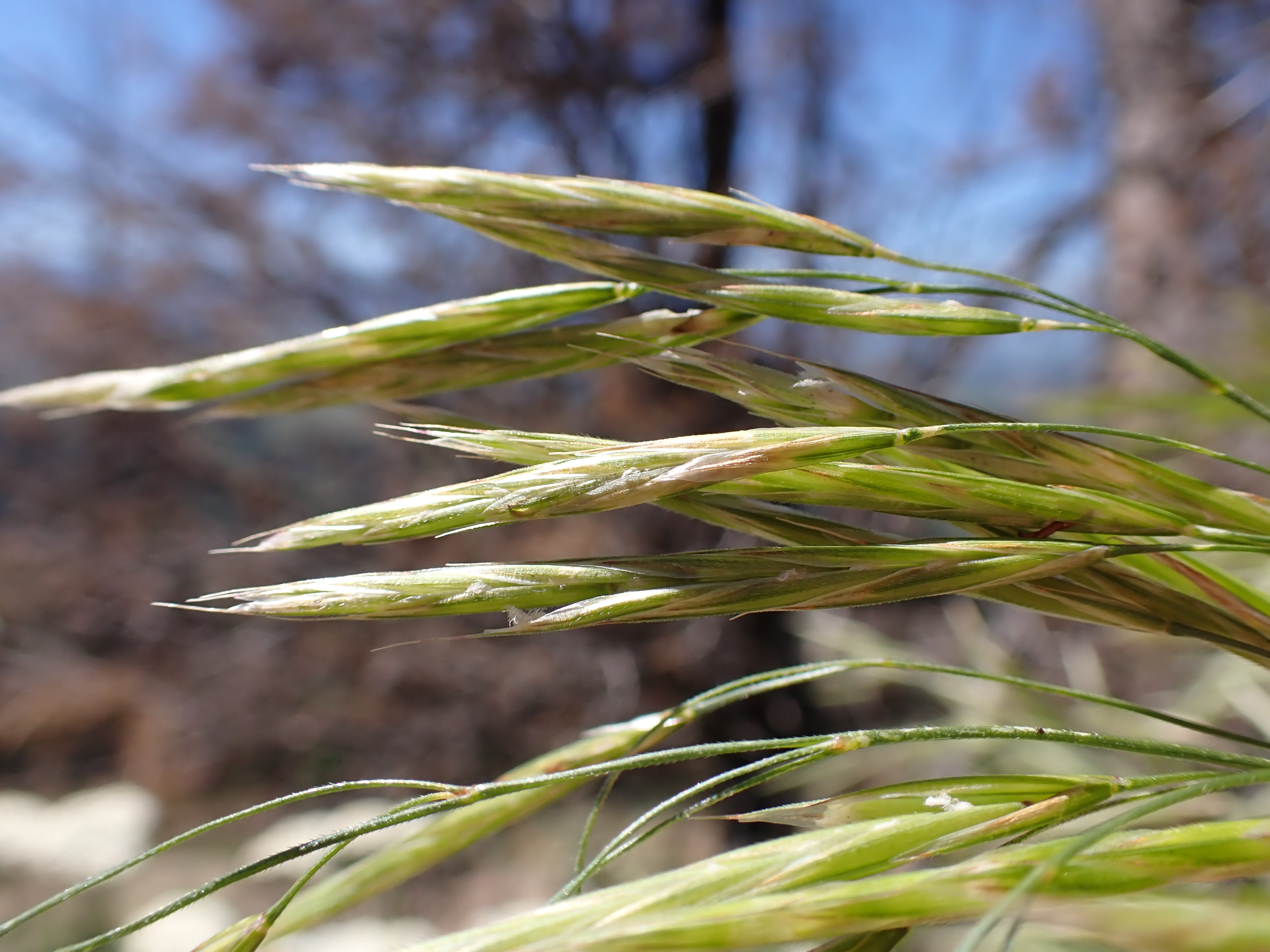

Scientific classification
- Kingdom: Plantae
- Clade: Tracheophytes
- Clade: Angiosperms
- Clade: Monocots
- Clade: Commelinids
- Order: Poales
- Family: Poaceae
- Subfamily: Pooideae
- Genus: Bromus
- Species: B. riparius

Binomial name
- Bromus riparius Rehmann

= Bromus riparius =

Species of grass

Bromus riparius is a species of grass in the family Poaceae.

Its native range is Northern Italy to Caucasus, China.
