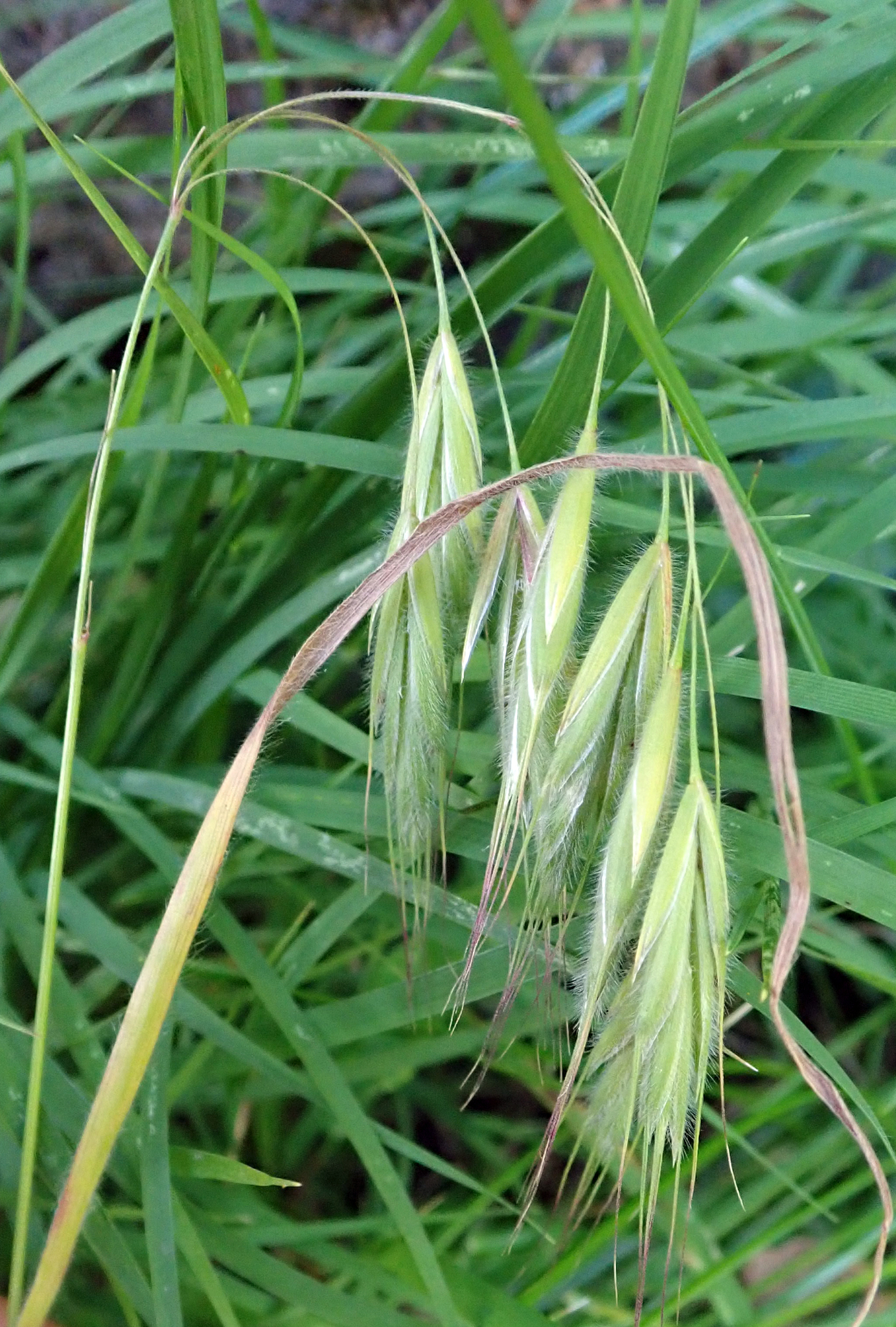

Scientific classification
- Kingdom: Plantae
- Clade: Tracheophytes
- Clade: Angiosperms
- Clade: Monocots
- Clade: Commelinids
- Order: Poales
- Family: Poaceae
- Subfamily: Pooideae
- Genus: Bromus
- Species: B. arenarius

Binomial name
- Bromus arenarius Labill.

Synonyms
- Bromus arenarius var. macrostachya Benth.; Serrafalcus arenarius (Labill.) C.A.Gardner

= Bromus arenarius =

Species of grass

Bromus arenarius is a species of brome grass known by the common name Australian brome.

It is native to much of Australia, and it is known in New Zealand and parts of North America as an introduced species. It is an annual grass growing up to 60 centimeters tall. Its narrow leaves are coated in soft hairs. The inflorescence is a wide array of nodding, flat spikelets, each on an individual stalk that may be curved or wavy.

== Description ==
Bromus arenarius grows culms 30–40 cm (12–16 in) tall, with slightly hairy nodes and internodes only becoming hairless towards their centers. Its leaf sheaths are slightly hairy, and its ligules are hairless. Its leaf blades are 7–15 cm (2.8–5.9 in) long, and can be either hairless or slightly hairy. Its inflorescence is an open, pyramidal panicle with spreading, wavy branches. Its spikelets are solitary, and fertile spikelets have pedicels. Each spikelet has five to fourteen florets. The glumes are shorter than the spikelets, with both upper and lower glumes lanceolate and covered with fine hairs.

== Distribution and habitat ==
Bromus arenarius is native to southern Australia, though it is introduced to the southern United States, northern Mexico, and northern New Zealand, where it grows in temperate climates. It prefers to grow in dry, sandy slopes and fields.
