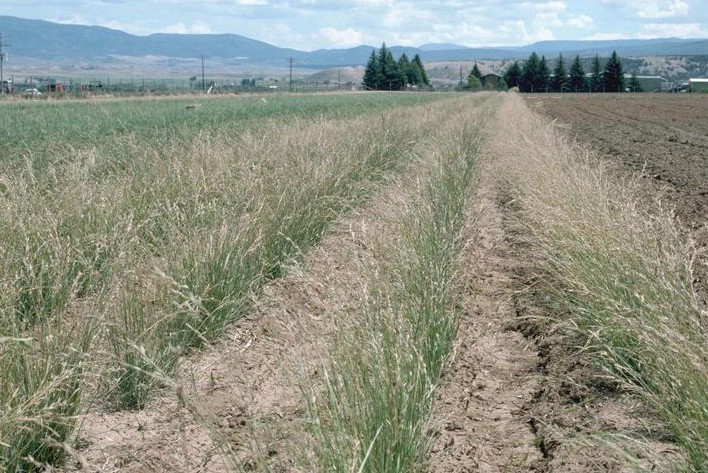

Conservation status
- Secure (NatureServe)

Scientific classification
- Kingdom: Plantae
- Clade: Tracheophytes
- Clade: Angiosperms
- Clade: Monocots
- Clade: Commelinids
- Order: Poales
- Family: Poaceae
- Subfamily: Pooideae
- Genus: Bromus
- Species: B. marginatus

Binomial name
- Bromus marginatus Nees ex Steud.

= Bromus marginatus =

Species of flowering plant

Bromus marginatus is a species of grass known by the common name mountain brome. It is native to western North America, and it is used widely for grazing animals and revegetating landscapes.

This short-lived perennial grass forms a large, shallow root network. The roots give it drought-tolerance, and they persist in the soil long after the plant has died, making it valuable for erosion control. The stems can usually reach one meter in height but are known to reach 1.5 meters. The hairy leaves are up to a centimeter wide. The inflorescence is a nodding panicle of spikelets, each with up to 10 flowers.

In the wild in its native range this grass grows in moister areas in mountain sagebrush, scrub, and meadows into the subalpine climate. It can tolerate thin, dry soils and some shade. It establishes easily and can become weedy. It can be planted on slopes and uneven terrain using a broadcast seeding method.

There are several cultivars of this grass, including 'Garnet', 'Bromar', and 'Tacit'. The latter has been known to produce 15 tons per hectare with 3 to 4 harvests per year.
