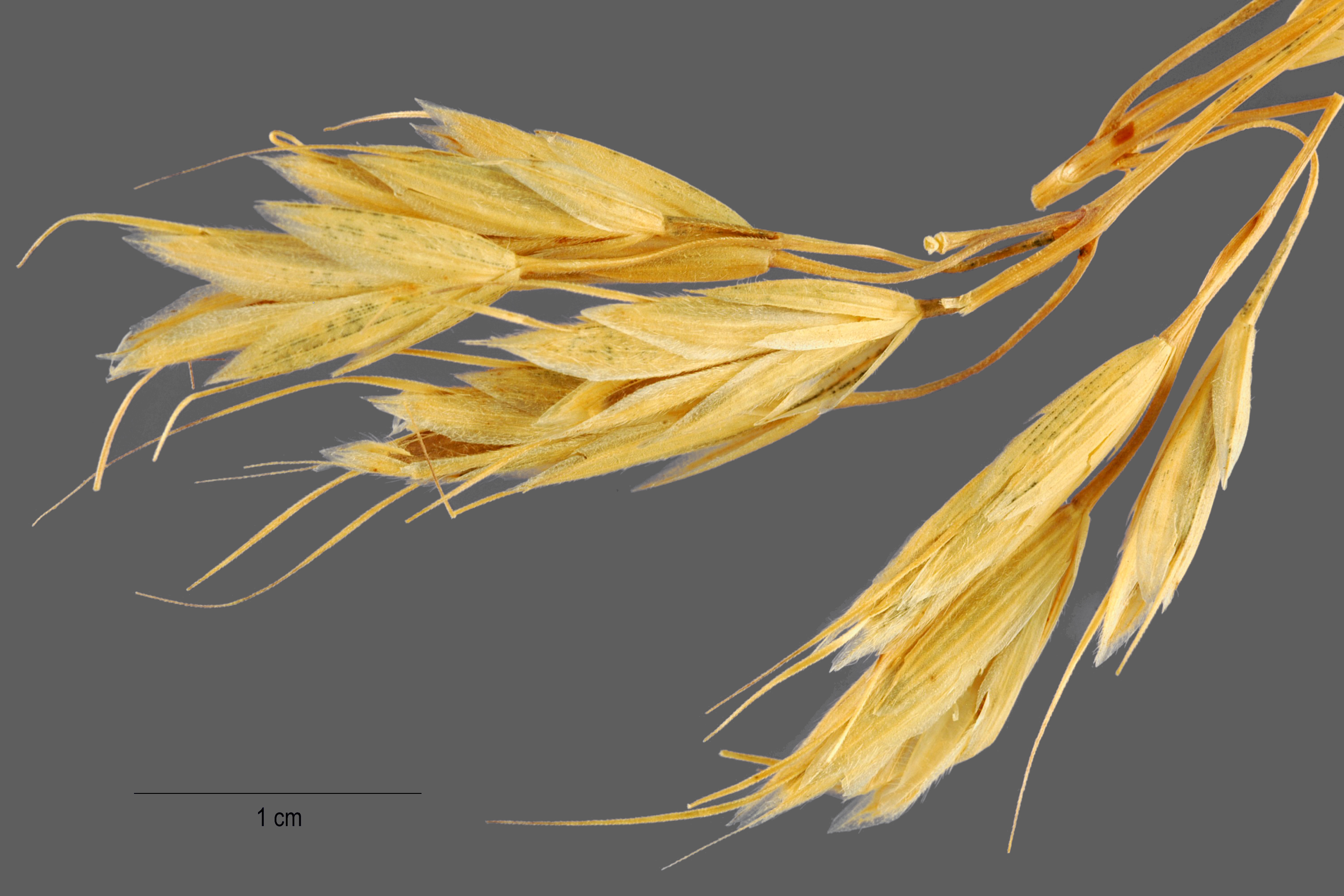

Scientific classification
- Kingdom: Plantae
- Clade: Tracheophytes
- Clade: Angiosperms
- Clade: Monocots
- Clade: Commelinids
- Order: Poales
- Family: Poaceae
- Subfamily: Pooideae
- Genus: Bromus
- Species: B. squarrosus

Binomial name
- Bromus squarrosus L.

= Bromus squarrosus =

Species of grass

Bromus squarrosus, the rough brome, is a brome grass native to Russia and Europe. The specific epithet squarrosus is Latin, meaning "with spreading tips". The grass has a diploid number of 14.

== Description ==
Bromus squarrosus is an annual grass, with culms growing 20–60 cm (7.9–23.6 in) high. The culms are hollow and bear four to five leaves with sheaths shorter than the blades. The leaf sheaths are pubescent and the leaf blades are typically pubescent but occasionally glabrous. The leaf blades are 5–15 cm (2.0–5.9 in) long and 4–6 mm (0.16–0.24 in) wide. The prominent ragged ligules are shaggy and 1–1.5 mm (0.039–0.059 in) long. The unilateral and lax panicles have few spreading or ascending branches that are erect in youth tend to nod at maturity. The racemose panicles are 7–20 cm (2.8–7.9 in) long and 4–8 cm (1.6–3.1 in) wide, and the branches are typically longer than the spikelets. The spikelets are typically solitary, lanceolate in youth and becoming more ovate at maturity, and are 2–4 cm (0.79–1.57 in) long and 5–10 mm (0.20–0.39 in) broad. The densely flowered spikelets bear ten to twenty flowers each, with the base of the florets hidden at maturity. The glumes can be smooth or scabrous. The lower glumes are three to five-veined and 4.5–7 mm (0.18–0.28 in) long, and the upper glumes are seven-veined and 6–8 mm (0.24–0.31 in) long. The unequal and ovate lemmas have nine faint nerves and broad translucent margins measuring as broad as 1 mm (0.039 in), and the lemmas do not roll inwards at maturity as other Bromus species typically would. The lemmas themselves are 8–11 mm (0.31–0.43 in) long and 2–2.4 mm (0.079–0.094 in) wide. The twisted and strongly divergent awns are 6–10 mm (0.24–0.39 in) long. The small anthers are approximately 1 mm (0.039 in) long and have notches at their ends. The caryopses are just as long as the paleas, and are flat or slightly rolled inwards.

The long nine-ribbed palea and the oblong spikelets morphologically distinguish the species from most other Bromus species.

The grass flowers in June and July.

== Habitat and distribution ==
Bromus squarrosus grows in overgrazed pastures, fields, and road verges. It prefers loamy or alluvial soils. It is native to central Russia and southern Europe, but is naturalized throughout southern Canada and the northern United States.
