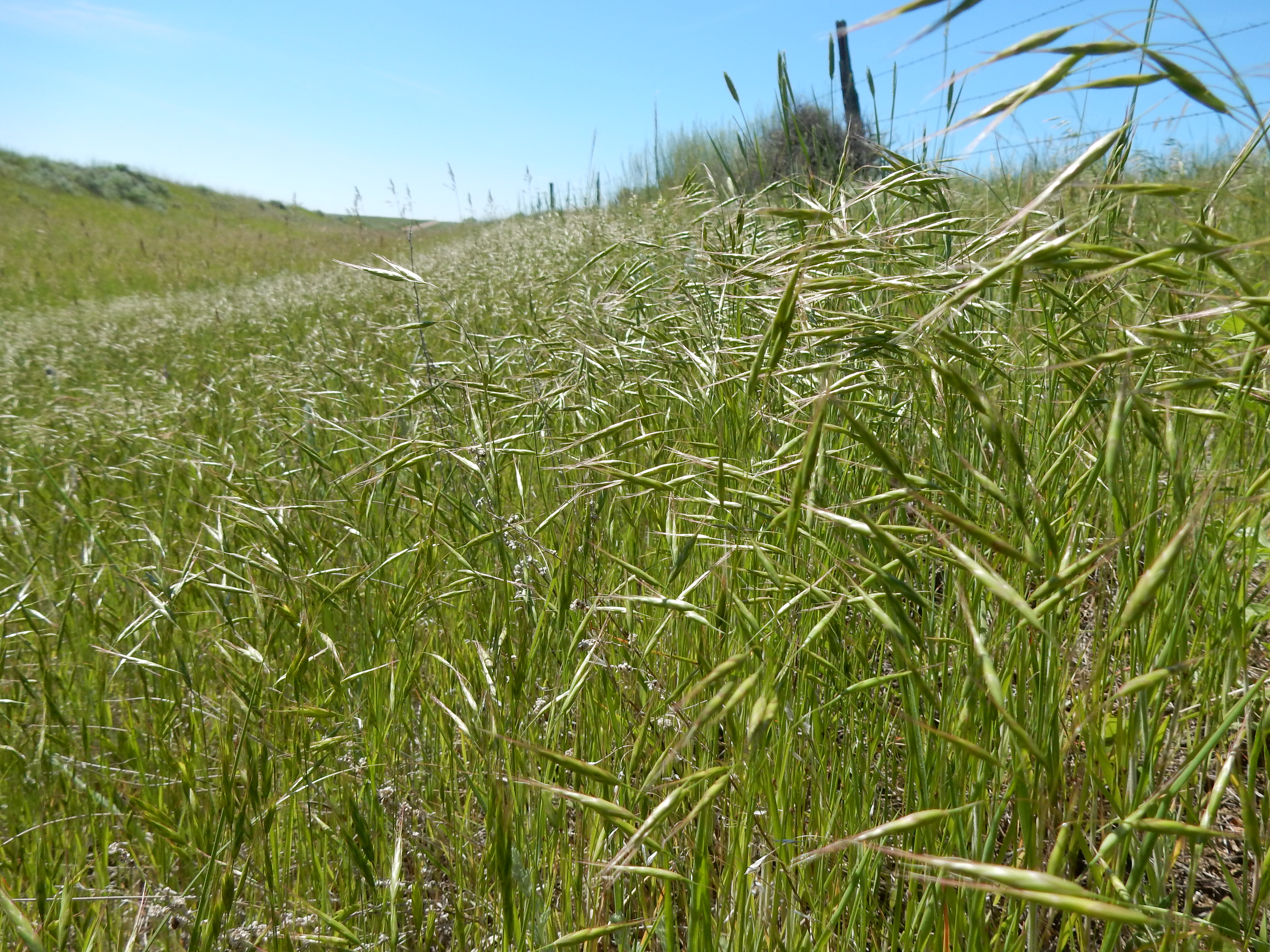

Scientific classification
- Kingdom: Plantae
- Clade: Tracheophytes
- Clade: Angiosperms
- Clade: Monocots
- Clade: Commelinids
- Order: Poales
- Family: Poaceae
- Subfamily: Pooideae
- Genus: Bromus
- Species: B. japonicus

Binomial name
- Bromus japonicus Thunb.

= Bromus japonicus =

Species of grass

Bromus japonicus, the Japanese brome, is an annual brome grass native to Eurasia. The grass has a diploid number of 14.

== Description ==
Bromus japonicus is an annual or biennial tufted grass growing 0.2–1 m (7.9 in – 3 ft 3.4 in) high. The culms are erect or ascending. The sheaths of the grass are pubescent, though upper sheaths are occasionally glabrous. The pubescent, obtuse ligules are 1–2.2 mm (0.039–0.087 in) long. The densely hairy leaf blades are 10–20 cm (3.9–7.9 in) long and 2–4 mm (0.079–0.157 in) wide. The open and secund panicles have divergent branches with drooping tips. The panicles are 10–22 cm (3.9–8.7 in) long and 4–13 cm (1.6–5.1 in) wide. The divergent branches are typically longer than the purplish spikelets and are ascending or spreading. The lanceolate spikelets are 2–2.5 cm (0.79–0.98 in) long and have slender pedicels. The six to twelve florets on each spikelet have concealed bases at maturity. The glumes are either smooth or scabrous. The acute lower glumes are three-nerved and 4.5–7 mm (0.18–0.28 in) long, and the obtuse upper glumes are five-nerved and 5–8 mm (0.20–0.31 in) long. The obtuse and firm, almost leathery lemmas are 7–9 mm (0.28–0.35 in) long and 1.2–2.2 mm (0.047–0.087 in) wide, with nine inconspicuous nerves. The margins of the lemmas roll slightly inwards at maturity, and the twisted and strongly divergent awns are 8–12 mm (0.31–0.47 in) long. The palea is distinctly shorter that its glume. The anthers are 1–1.5 mm (0.039–0.059 in) long. The caryopses are slightly shorter than the paleas, and are thin, flat, and slightly rolled inwards.

The grass flowers from June to August.

== Habitat and distribution ==
Bromus japonicus grows in fields, waste places, road verges, sand dunes, and other similar places. It is a troublesome weed in grain fields and is a noxious weed in prairies, as it competes with native perennials for water and nutrients. It is intolerant of alkaline soils.

The grass is native to Eurasia but has been naturalized throughout the United States and southern Canada and is rare in the Yukon.
