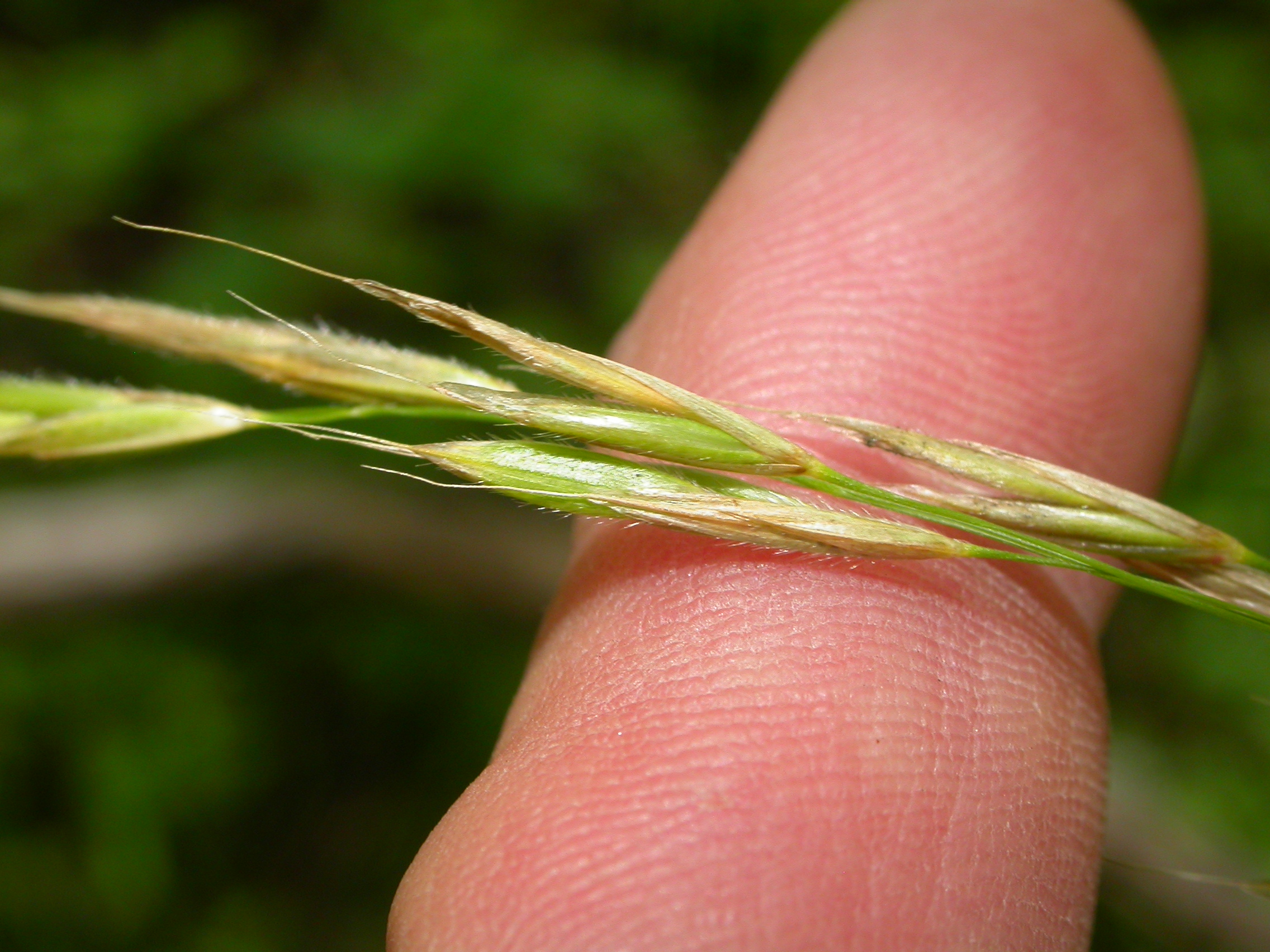
- Hairy spikelets, Gallatin County, Montana

Scientific classification
- Kingdom: Plantae
- Clade: Tracheophytes
- Clade: Angiosperms
- Clade: Monocots
- Clade: Commelinids
- Order: Poales
- Family: Poaceae
- Subfamily: Pooideae
- Genus: Bromus
- Species: B. ciliatus

Binomial name
- Bromus ciliatus L.

= Bromus ciliatus =

Species of grass

Bromus ciliatus is a species of brome grass known by the common name fringed brome. It is native to most of North America, including most of Canada, most of the United States except for some portions of the South, and northern Mexico. It is a plant of many habitats, including temperate coniferous forest. The specific epithet ciliatus is Latin for "ciliate", referring to the delicate hairs of the leaf blades.

== Description ==
Bromus ciliatus is a perennial grass that grows in tufts up to 1.2 m (3 ft 11 in) tall, and occasionally taller in the Great Plains. The grass lacks rhizomes but has a well developed root system. The sheaths are glabrous or bear minute hairs and have a narrow "V" shaped orifice. The sheaths are typically shorter than the internodes. The scabrous leaves often have sparse long hairs and measure 3–16 mm (0.12–0.63 in) wide. The open inflorescence bears many spikelets on stalks, the upper ones ascending and the lower nodding or drooping. This panicle is 10–30 cm (3.9–11.8 in) long. The flattened spikelets are 1.5–3 cm (0.59–1.18 in) long and 4–10 mm (0.16–0.39 in) wide. The spikelets are greenish and occasionally tinged with bronze or purple. The spikelets bear three to nine flowers and display their rachilla at maturity. The glumes are conduplicate, with the upper glume tapering at its base. The firm lemmas are also conduplicate, measuring 2.5–3.5 mm (0.098–0.138 in) broad with delicate nerves. The linear palea is typically enclosed by the folded lemma. The anthers are 1–2.5 mm (0.039–0.098 in) long. The caryopsis is lanceolate in shape.

The grass flowers from July into early October.

== Habitat ==
Bromus ciliatus is common in subalpine areas. It is a very palatable forage grass that is heavily grazed and shade tolerant. The grass occurs in many moist conditions, in wet woodlands, moist meadows or thickets, stream banks, pond and lake margins, bogs, and marshes.
