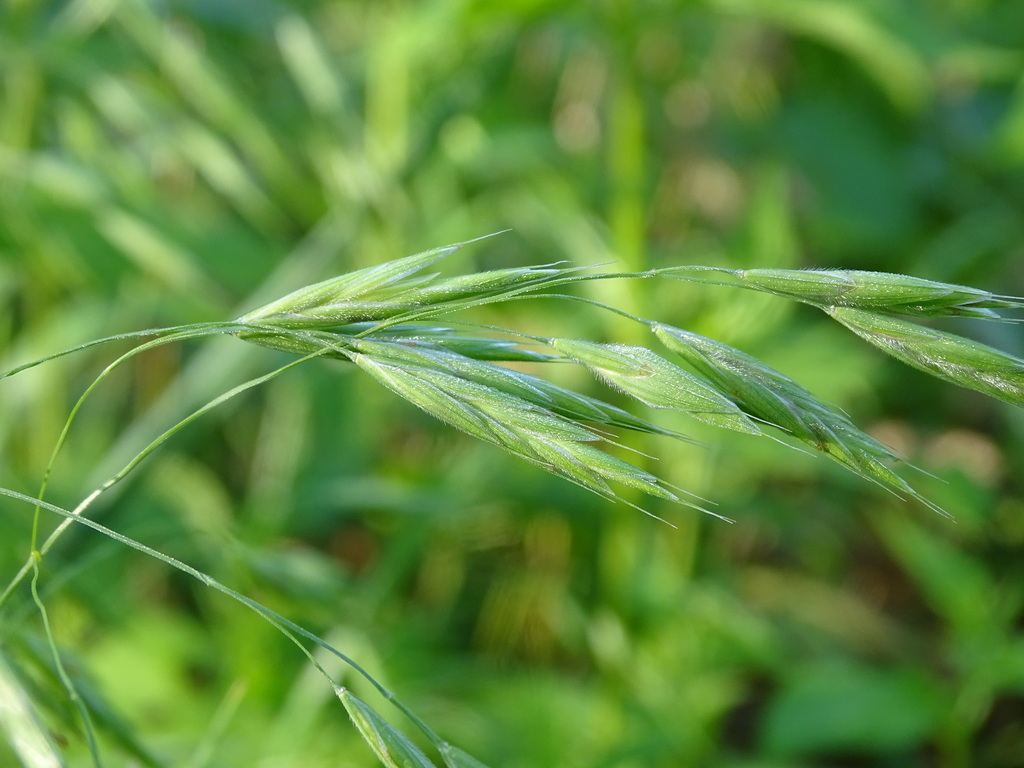

Scientific classification
- Kingdom: Plantae
- Clade: Tracheophytes
- Clade: Angiosperms
- Clade: Monocots
- Clade: Commelinids
- Order: Poales
- Family: Poaceae
- Subfamily: Pooideae
- Genus: Bromus
- Species: B. latiglumis

Binomial name
- Bromus latiglumis (Shear) Hitchc.

= Bromus latiglumis =

Species of grass

Bromus latiglumis, the earlyleaf brome, is a grass native to North America. The specific epithet latiglumis is Latin for "broad-glumed", referring to the wide glumes.

== Description ==
Bromus latiglumis is a perennial grass that grows in mats or clumps 0.5–2 m (1 ft 8 in – 6 ft 7 in) tall. The leaves are cauline. Sheaths are ribbed and glabrous, covering most nodes. The dark green leaf blades are 5–17 mm (0.20–0.67 in) wide with a white midrib. The ovoid panicle is 15–30 cm (5.9–11.8 in) long. The branches of the panicle are either spreading or reflexed and have large basal pulvini. The branches solitary or occur in pairs. The elliptical or oblong spikelets are 1.5–3.5 cm (0.59–1.38 in) long and 5–9 mm (0.20–0.35 in) broad. The spikelets are loosely flowered with three to eight flowers on each spikelet. The glumes are either pilose or glabrous. The five to seven nerved lemmas are 3–4 mm (0.12–0.16 in) long and are mostly glabrous though sericeous towards their base. The awns are 2–6 mm (0.079–0.236 in) long. The palea has a rounded tip and the anthers are 1.5–2.5 mm (0.059–0.098 in) long.

The grass flowers from August to September. The grass occurs in wet woods and prairies, stream banks, and alluvial plains.

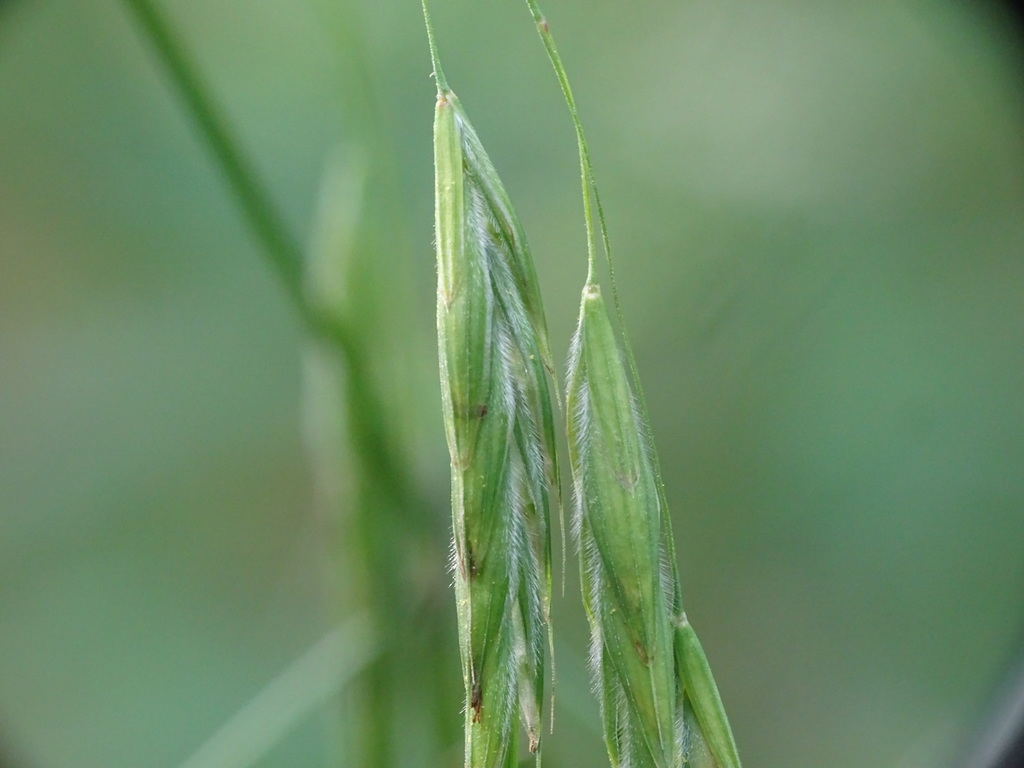
Spikelets

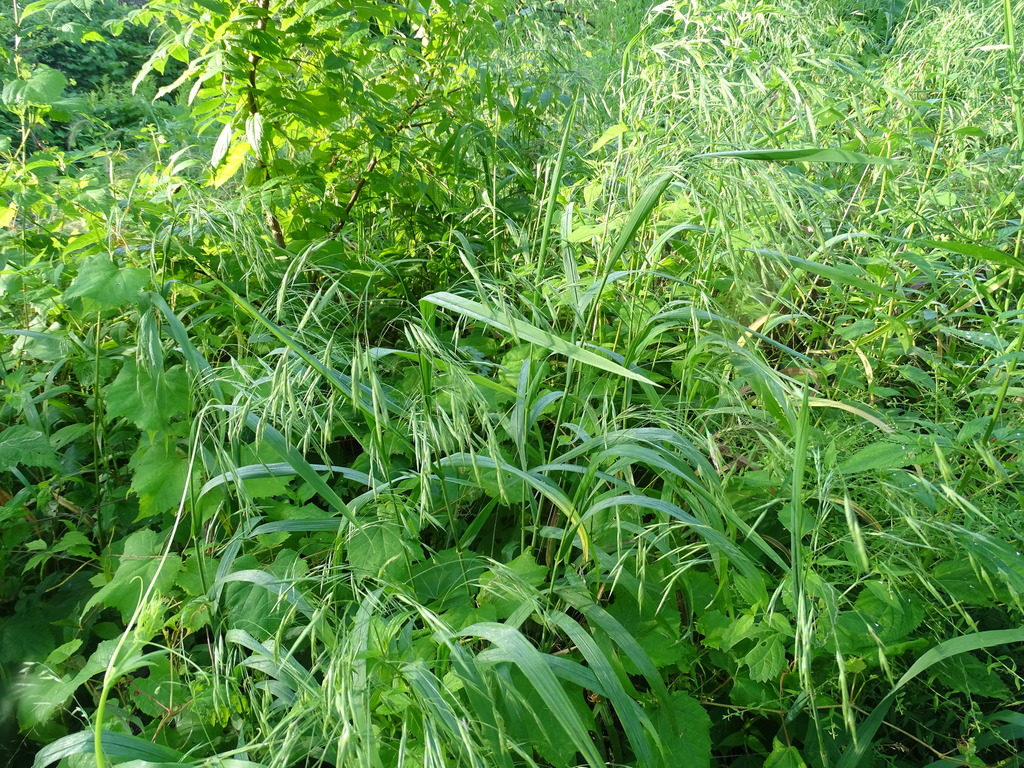
Plant habit
