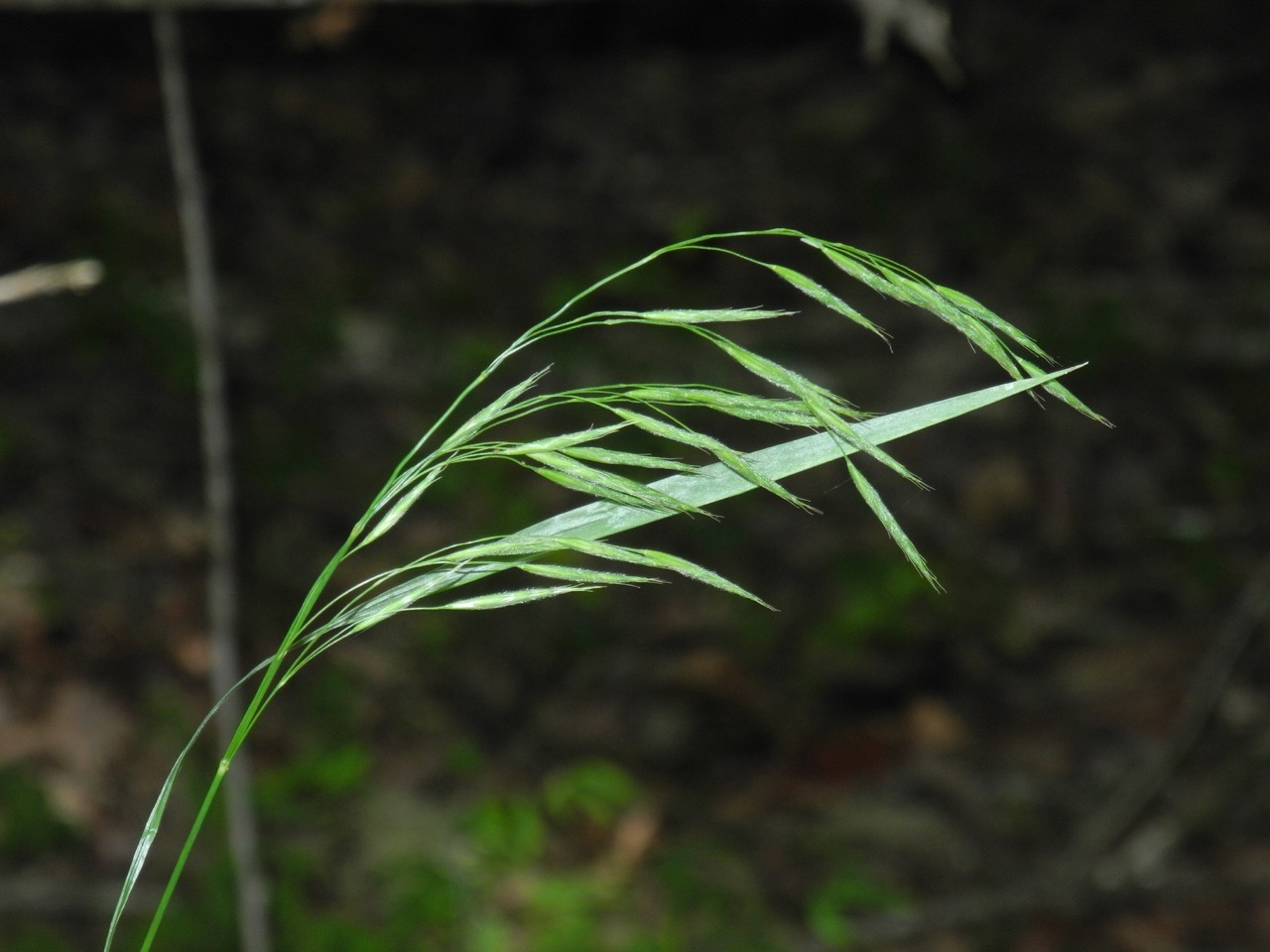

Scientific classification
- Kingdom: Plantae
- Clade: Tracheophytes
- Clade: Angiosperms
- Clade: Monocots
- Clade: Commelinids
- Order: Poales
- Family: Poaceae
- Subfamily: Pooideae
- Genus: Bromus
- Species: B. nottowayanus

Binomial name
- Bromus nottowayanus Fernald

= Bromus nottowayanus =

Species of grass

Bromus nottowayanus, the Nottoway Valley brome or satin brome, is a brome grass native to North America. The specific epithet nottowayanus refers to the Nottoway Valley. The grass has a diploid number of 14.

== Description ==
Bromus nottowayanus is a perennial grass, lacking rhizomes, with solitary or tufted culms growing up to 0.6–1.5 m (2 ft 0 in – 4 ft 11 in) in height. The six to eight cauline leaves have reversed sheaths that are covered with soft hairs. The sheaths nearly cover the nodes and the ligule is hidden. The nodes are either pubescent or glabrous and internodes are glabrous. The grass lacks auricles. The leaf blades are 15–30 cm (5.9–11.8 in) long and 0.6–1.3 cm (0.24–0.51 in) wide and are covered with short hairs on their upper side. The lax and nodding panicle is 5–20 cm (2.0–7.9 in) long and the pulvini are slender. The often recurved branches of the panicle are typically ascending or spreading. The often purplish spikelets have three to eleven flowers and are 1.8–4 cm (0.71–1.57 in) long. The lower glume is one to three-nerved and 5.5–8 mm (0.22–0.31 in) long, and the upper glume is five or seven-nerved and 7–10 mm (0.28–0.39 in) long. The shortly hairy lemmas are 8–13 mm (0.31–0.51 in) long and have straight awns 5–8 mm (0.20–0.31 in) long. The palea is densely hairy and has a flat tip.

The species is distinguished from Bromus pubescens by the satin-like sheen on the underside of its leaves from which it derives its common name. The grass flowers later than B. pubescens as well, flowering in late July rather than late June.

== Habitat and distribution ==
Bromus nottowayanus occurs in shaded hardwood forests, especially near streams, though usually above the lowest and wettest conditions. It occasionally will occur in dryer places.

The grass is native to the eastern and central-eastern United States, from Iowa to New York and south to Oklahoma, and throughout Virginia.
