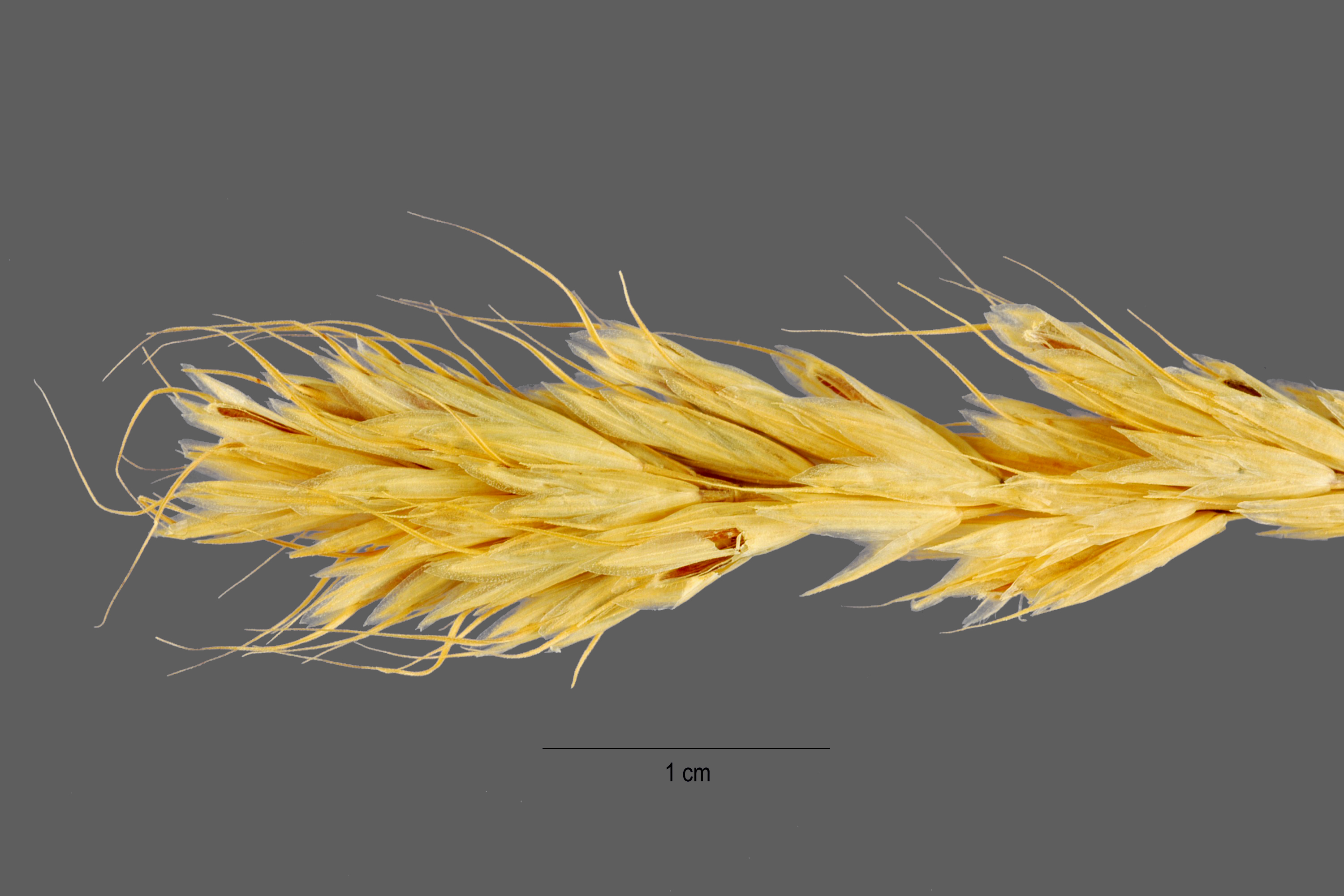
- Seedheads
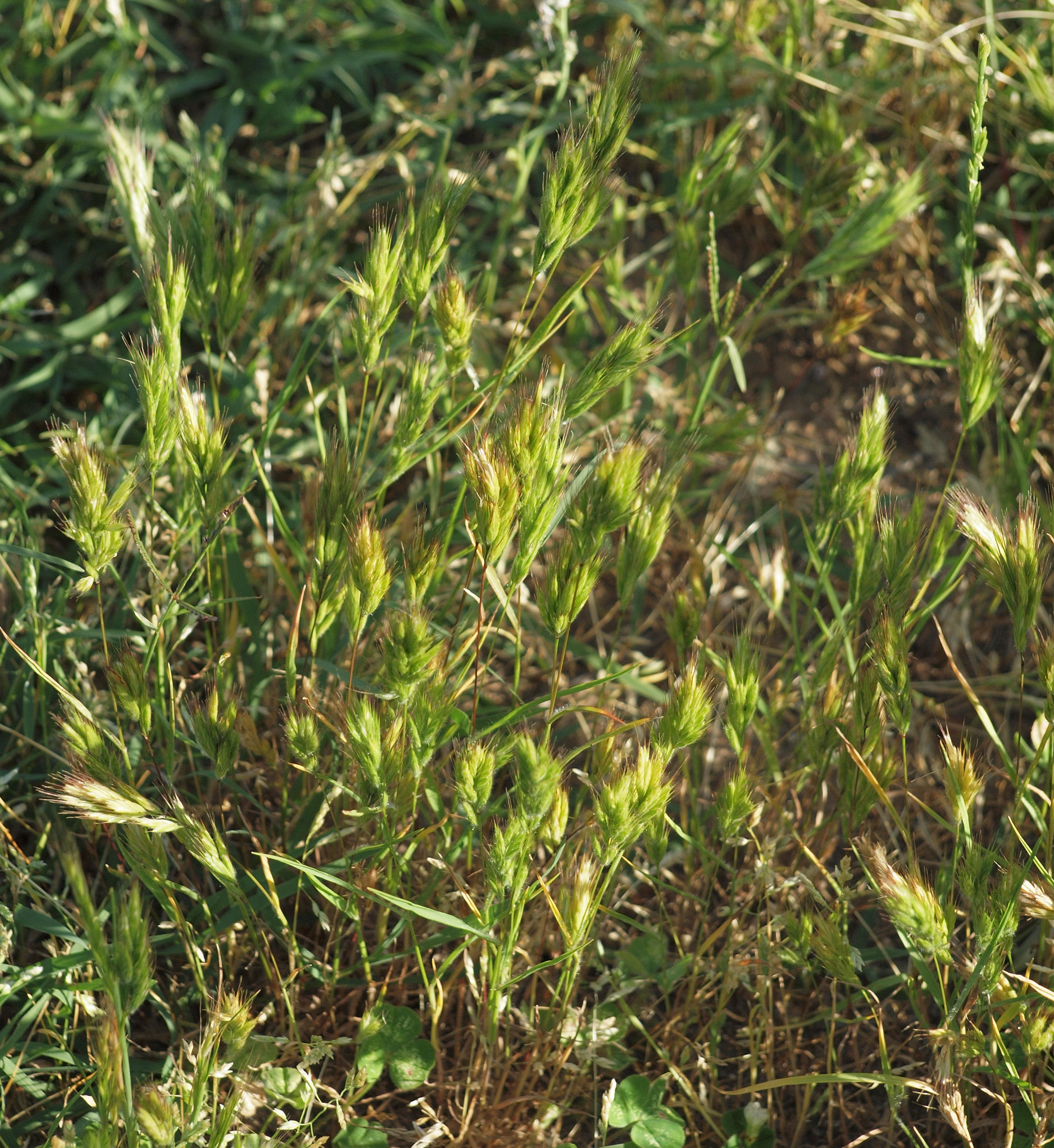
- Habit

Scientific classification
- Kingdom: Plantae
- Clade: Embryophytes
- Clade: Tracheophytes
- Clade: Spermatophytes
- Clade: Angiosperms
- Clade: Monocots
- Clade: Commelinids
- Order: Poales
- Family: Poaceae
- Subfamily: Pooideae
- Genus: Bromus
- Species: B. scoparius

Binomial name
- Bromus scoparius L.

Synonyms
- List: Anisantha rigens (L.) Nevski; Bromus cavanillesii Willk.; Bromus confertus M.Bieb.; Bromus degenii Pénzes; Bromus erectus Moris; Bromus humilis Cav.; Bromus ovatus Gaertn.; Bromus rigens L.; Bromus scoparius f. cylindricus Kozuharov, Stoeva & Kuzmanov; Bromus scoparius f. pauciflorus Kozuharov, Stoeva & Kuzmanov; Serrafalcus cavanillesii Willk.; Serrafalcus scoparius (L.) Parl.

= Bromus scoparius =

Species of flowering plant

Bromus scoparius, the broom brome, is a species of flowering plant in the family Poaceae. It is native to the Mediterranean, Crimea, the Middle East, the Caucasus region, Central Asia, Xinjiang in China, and on to the northwest Indian Subcontinent, and has been introduced to Chile, California, a few locales in the eastern US, and southeast China. A somewhat weedy annual, it prefers to grow in grasslands.
