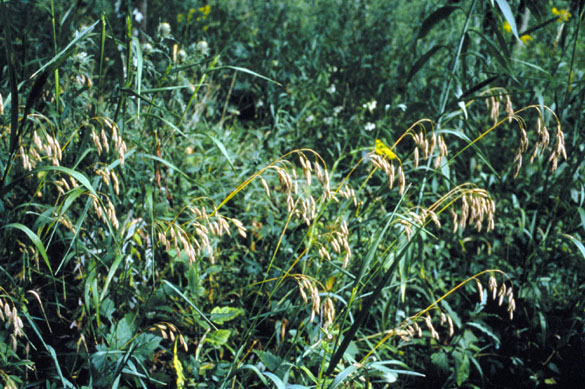

Scientific classification
- Kingdom: Plantae
- Clade: Tracheophytes
- Clade: Angiosperms
- Clade: Monocots
- Clade: Commelinids
- Order: Poales
- Family: Poaceae
- Subfamily: Pooideae
- Genus: Bromus
- Species: B. kalmii

Binomial name
- Bromus kalmii A.Gray

Synonyms
- Bromopsis kalmii (A.Gray) Holub

= Bromus kalmii =

Species of grass

Bromus kalmii, Kalm's brome, is a species of brome grass. It is a native bunchgrass in the North-central and Northeastern United States, the Great Lakes region, and eastern Canada. The specific epithet kalmii refers to its discoverer Pehr Kalm.

== Description ==
Bromus kalmii is a perennial grass, with solitary or slightly tufted culms that grow 0.4–1.2 m (1 ft 4 in – 3 ft 11 in) tall. The culms are pubescent just below the nodes. The grass typically has three to five and occasionally six leaf blades. The firm and scabrous leaf blades are either pubescent or glabrous and are 7–17 cm (2.8–6.7 in) long and 4–10 mm (0.16–0.39 in) wide. The glabrous or sometimes shaggy sheaths are mostly shorter than the internodes and each have a V-shaped cleft. The ligule is typically 0.5 mm (0.020 in) long. The narrow, crowded panicle is 5–15 cm (2.0–5.9 in) long. The lower branches of the panicle are very slender and each bear one or two spikelets. The five to eleven flowered spikelets are 1.4–2.6 cm (0.55–1.02 in) long and 5–6 mm (0.20–0.24 in) wide. Both glumes have short, adpressed hairs. The lower glume is three-nerved and the upper glume is five-nerved. The densely hairy lemmas are oblong to elliptical in shape, and have straight awns 1–3 mm (0.039–0.118 in) long. The oblong and flat palea is slightly shorter than the glume. The anthers are approximately 2 mm (0.079 in) long.

The grass flowers from July to through August.

== Habitat ==
Bromus kalmii grows in dry or moist open areas or thickets, especially on calcareous soils.
