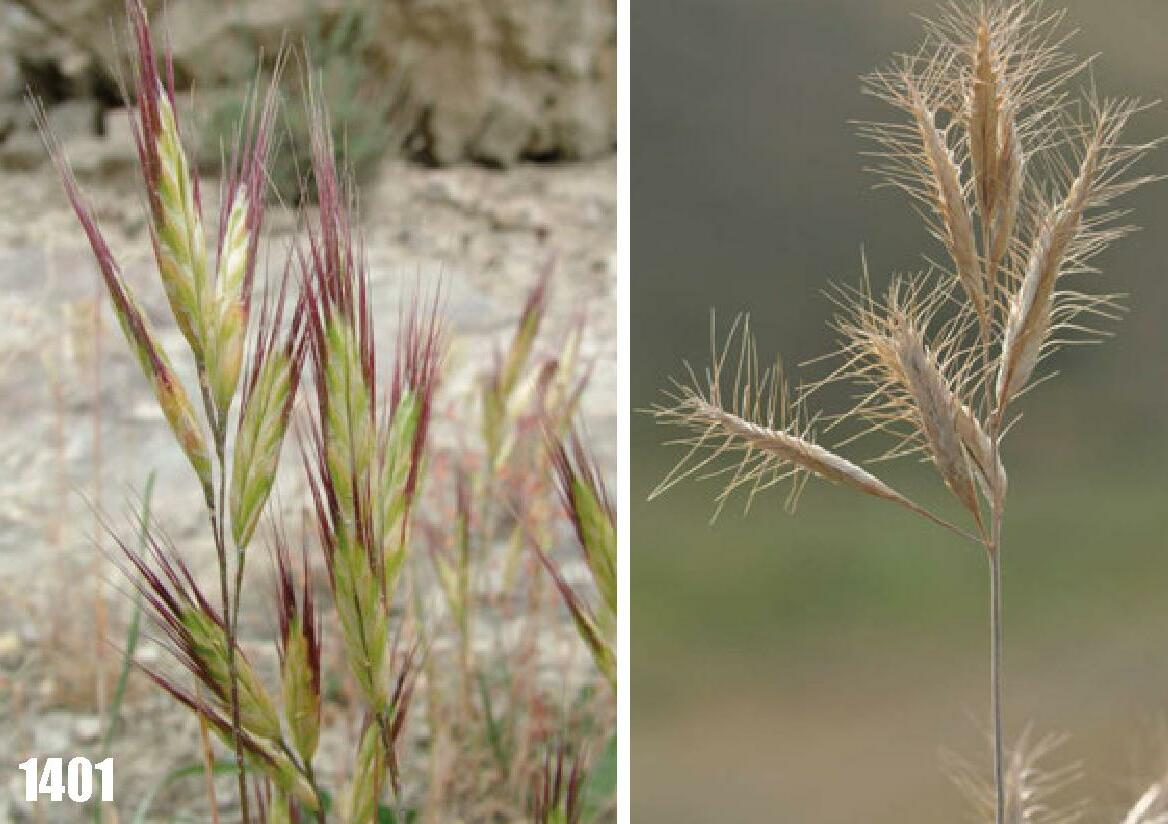

Scientific classification
- Kingdom: Plantae
- Clade: Tracheophytes
- Clade: Angiosperms
- Clade: Monocots
- Clade: Commelinids
- Order: Poales
- Family: Poaceae
- Subfamily: Pooideae
- Genus: Bromus
- Species: B. danthoniae

Binomial name
- Bromus danthoniae Trin.

Synonyms
- List: Boissiera danthoniae (Trin.) A.Braun; Bromus danthoniae var. pauciaristatus Naderi; Bromus danthoniae subsp. pseudodanthoniae (Drobow) H.Scholz; Bromus danthoniae subsp. rogersii C.E.Hubb. ex H.Scholz; Bromus pseudodanthoniae Drobow; Bromus pseudodanthoniae var. pubiglumis Tzvelev; Bromus turcomanicus H.Scholz; Triniusa danthoniae (Trin.) Steud.

= Bromus danthoniae =

Species of flowering plant

Bromus danthoniae, the oat brome or three-awned brome, is a species of flowering plant in the family Poaceae, native to Turkey, Cyprus, the Caucasus region, the Middle East, Central Asia, Afghanistan, Pakistan, the western Himalayas, and Tibet. It is rarely discovered growing in other locations, but apparently not in sustained populations. It grows in a wide variety of habitats, and shows morphological variation due to the differing conditions in those habitats.
