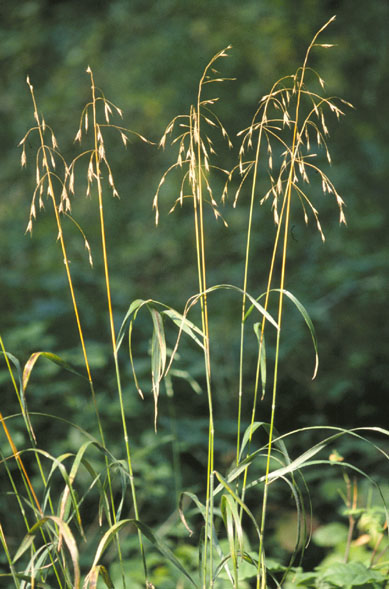

Scientific classification
- Kingdom: Plantae
- Clade: Embryophytes
- Clade: Tracheophytes
- Clade: Spermatophytes
- Clade: Angiosperms
- Clade: Monocots
- Clade: Commelinids
- Order: Poales
- Family: Poaceae
- Subfamily: Pooideae
- Genus: Bromus
- Species: B. pubescens

Binomial name
- Bromus pubescens Muhl. ex Willd.

Synonyms
- Bromopsis pubescens (Muhl. ex Willd.) Holub; Bromus ciliatus fo. laeviglumis (Scribn. ex Shear) Wiegand; Bromus ciliatus subvar. laevivaginatus (Wiegand) Farw.; Bromus ciliatus var. laeviglumis Scribn. ex Shear; Bromus hookeri var. pubescens (Muhl. ex Willd.) E. Fourn.; Bromus laeviglumis (Scribn. ex Shear) Hitchc.; Bromus purgans fo. glabriflorus Wiegand; Bromus purgans fo. laevivaginatus Wiegand; Bromus purgans var. laeviglumis (Scribn. ex Shear) Swallen; Forasaccus ciliatus var. laeviglumis (Scribn. ex Shear) Lunell

= Bromus pubescens =

Species of grass

Bromus pubescens, the hairy woodland brome or hairy wood chess, is a grass species found across much of the eastern and central United States, as well as in Arizona, Québec and Ontario.

Bromus pubescens is a perennial grass up to 1.2 m (4 feet) tall. Leaf blades are up to 30 cm (12 inches) long and 15 mm (0.6 inches) across. Spikelets are drooping, up to 3 cm (1.2 inches) long, lacking awns on the glumes.
