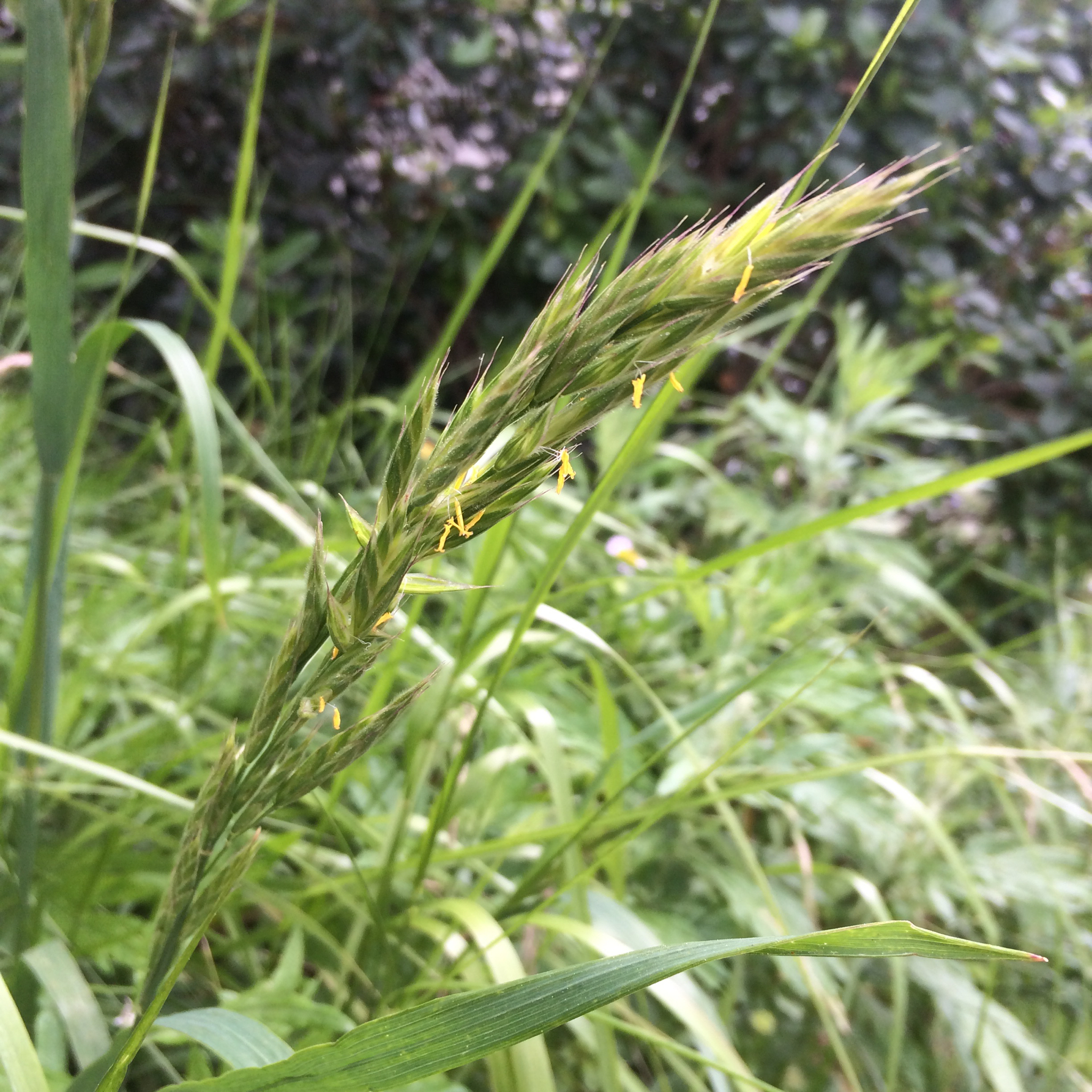

Scientific classification
- Kingdom: Plantae
- Clade: Tracheophytes
- Clade: Angiosperms
- Clade: Monocots
- Clade: Commelinids
- Order: Poales
- Family: Poaceae
- Subfamily: Pooideae
- Genus: Bromus
- Species: B. maritimus

Binomial name
- Bromus maritimus (Piper) Hitchc.

Synonyms
- Bromus marginatus subsp. maritimus Piper(basionym); Bromus carinitus var. maritimus (Piper) C.L.Hitchc.; Ceratochloa maritima (Piper) Holub

= Bromus maritimus =

Species of flowering plant

Bromus maritimus is a species of brome grass known by the common names maritime brome and seaside brome. It is native to the coastal areas of California and Oregon.
