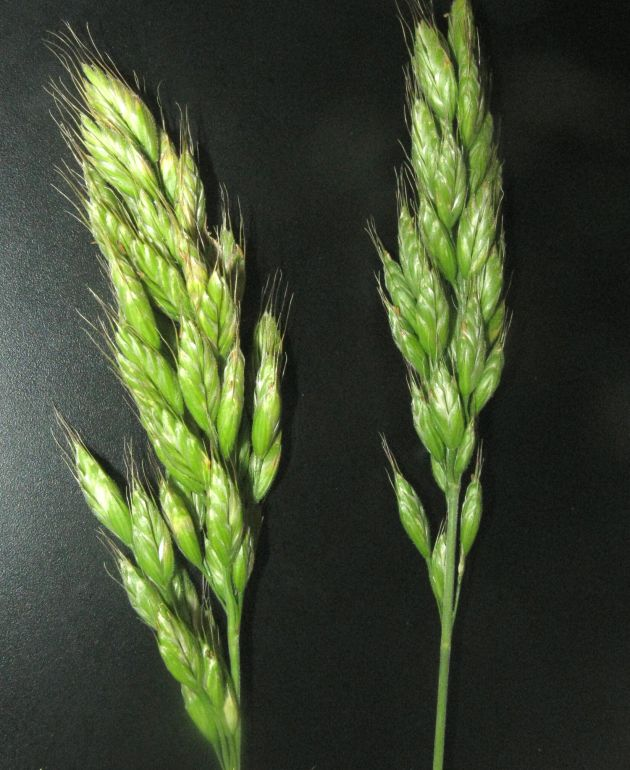
- Inflorescence

Conservation status
- Data Deficient (IUCN 3.1)

Scientific classification
- Kingdom: Plantae
- Clade: Embryophytes
- Clade: Tracheophytes
- Clade: Spermatophytes
- Clade: Angiosperms
- Clade: Monocots
- Clade: Commelinids
- Order: Poales
- Family: Poaceae
- Subfamily: Pooideae
- Genus: Bromus
- Species: B. grossus

Binomial name
- Bromus grossus Desf. ex DC.

Synonyms
- Bromus nitidus Dumort.; Bromus velutinus Schrad.; Serrafalcus grossus (Desf. ex DC.) Rouy

= Bromus grossus =

Species of grass

Bromus grossus, the whiskered brome, is a species of flowering plant in the family Poaceae. It is native to central Europe, and has been introduced to Great Britain, New York and Oregon in the United States. It has gone extinct in the Netherlands. During the Neolithic it arose as a weed of spelt fields, and due to changing agricultural practices, it is now considered highly endangered under the Habitats Directive.

== Distribution, ecology and conservation ==
Bromus grossus was once a widespread companion of traditional winter cereals such as spelt and rye across the calcareous farmlands of central-western Europe. Historical herbarium records and floristic surveys compiled for Belgium show that, during the late nineteenth century, the grass was recorded from more than seventy 4 × 4 km squares, chiefly on the limestone plateaux flanking the Meuse valley. By the late twentieth century, however, it survived in barely a dozen Belgian localities, and comparable declines have been documented in France, Switzerland and southern Germany. The pattern is closely tied to agricultural intensification: deep ploughing, systematic herbicide use, mineral fertilisers and the near disappearance of on-farm spelt seed stocks have eliminated the shallow-tilled, nutrient-poor field margins where B. grossus completes its annual life cycle.

Ecologically, the species germinates in autumn alongside the crop, overwinters as a small tuft and flowers in early summer. Its tough panicle axis prevents the ripe spikelets from shattering, so the seed was historically harvested and re-sown with the cereal, an inadvertent "farming partnership" now broken by modern seed cleaning. Where it still persists—in a handful of Walloon, Bavarian and Swiss fields—the grass is usually restricted to lightly fertilised spelt strips or uncultivated headlands that escape spraying. Conservationists therefore regard B. grossus as a flagship for arable-weed biodiversity. Current measures focus on agri-environment schemes that maintain winter cereals three years in five, ban synthetic inputs along a two-metre field border and encourage farmers to retain small amounts of local spelt seed deliberately "contaminated" with the brome. Botanical gardens also backstop wild populations by storing seed at low temperature, a feasible strategy because the species shows little dormancy loss in cold, dry conditions. Without such combined in situ and ex-situ actions, the grass is expected to vanish from open countryside within a few decades.
