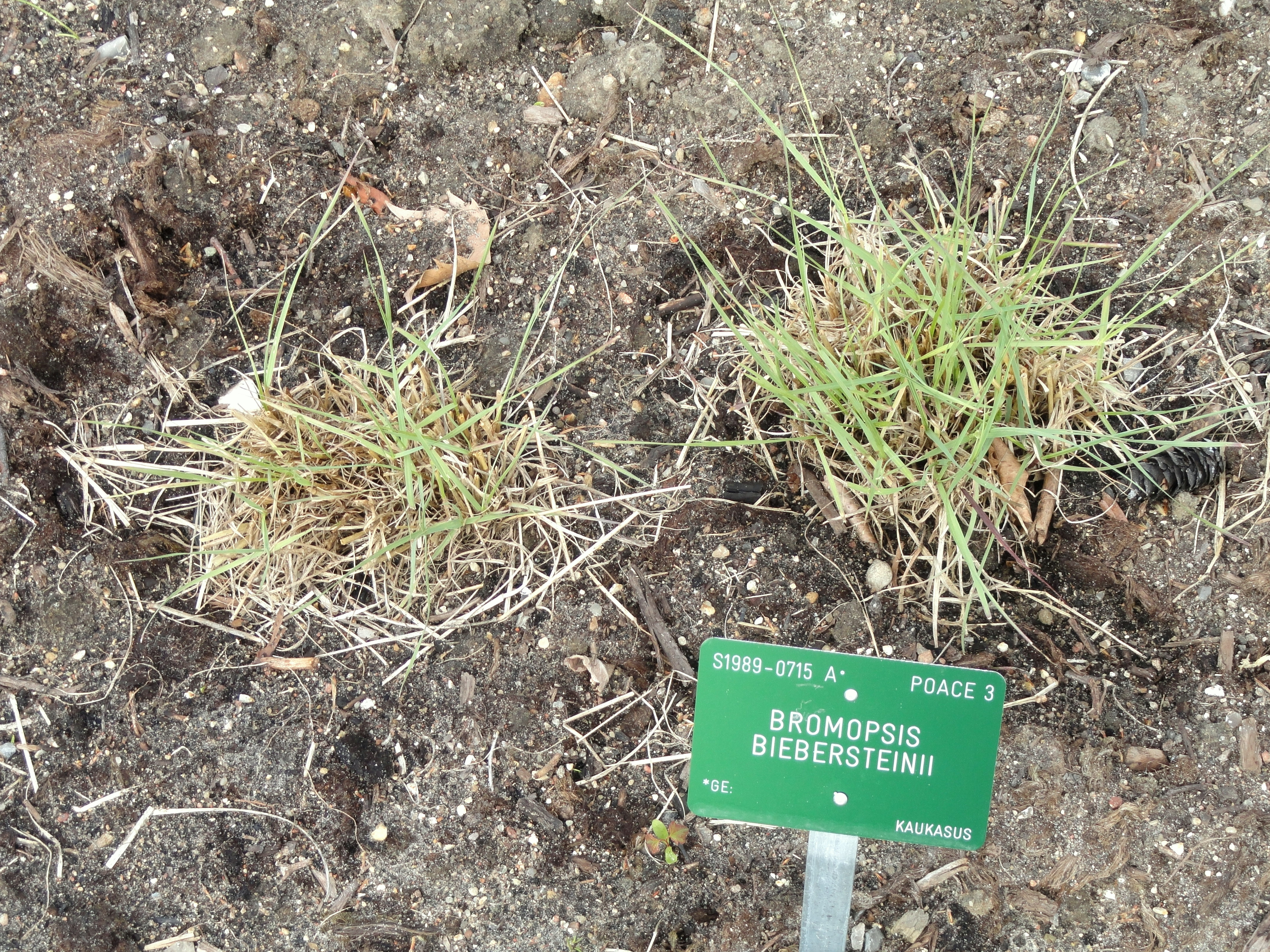
- Growth level by early May at the University of Copenhagen Botanical Garden

Scientific classification
- Kingdom: Plantae
- Clade: Tracheophytes
- Clade: Angiosperms
- Clade: Monocots
- Clade: Commelinids
- Order: Poales
- Family: Poaceae
- Subfamily: Pooideae
- Genus: Bromus
- Species: B. biebersteinii

Binomial name
- Bromus biebersteinii Roem. & Schult.

Synonyms
- List: Bromopsis beckeri (Tzvelev) Tzvelev; Bromopsis biebersteinii (Roem. & Schult.) Holub; Bromopsis biebersteinii subsp. beckeri (Tzvelev) Tzvelev; Bromopsis biebersteinii var. beckeri Tzvelev; Bromopsis biebersteinii subsp. kazbecki (Tzvelev) Tzvelev; Bromopsis biebersteinii var. kazbecki Tzvelev; Bromopsis kazbecki (Tzvelev) Tzvelev; Bromus albidus M.Bieb.; Bromus angustissimus K.Koch; Bromus chloroticus M.Bieb. ex Kunth; Bromus inermis Steven; Zerna biebersteinii (Roem. & Schult.) Nevski

= Bromus biebersteinii =

Species of grass

Bromus biebersteinii, the meadow bromegrass or just meadow brome, is a species of flowering plant in the family Poaceae, native to the Caucasus, Iraq, Iran and Afghanistan. It has been developed as a forage in North America and there are a number of cultivars available, including 'Arsenal', 'Cache', 'Fleet', 'MacBeth', 'Montana', 'Paddock' and 'Regar'.
