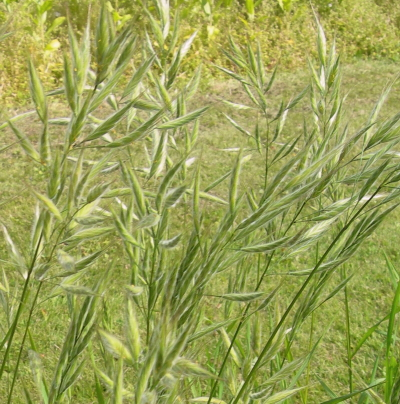
- Foliage

Scientific classification
- Kingdom: Plantae
- Clade: Embryophytes
- Clade: Tracheophytes
- Clade: Angiosperms
- Clade: Monocots
- Clade: Commelinids
- Order: Poales
- Family: Poaceae
- Subfamily: Pooideae
- Genus: Bromus
- Species: B. lanceolatus

Binomial name
- Bromus lanceolatus Roth

Synonyms
- List: Bromus argypheus Paine; Bromus canariensis Zuccagni; Bromus depauperatus H.Scholz; Bromus discretus F.M.Vázquez & H.Scholz; Bromus divaricatus Rhode ex Loisel.; Bromus lanceolatus var. dasystachys Maire; Bromus lanceolatus var. lanatus Kerguélen; Bromus lanceolatus var. leiostachys Maire; Bromus lanuginosus Poir.; Bromus macrostachys Desf.; Bromus macrostachyus Guss.; Bromus modensis Steud.; Bromus poiretii Tzvelev & Prob.; Bromus tomentosus Rohde; Bromus turgidus Pers.; Forasaccus lanceolatus (Roth) Bubani; Serrafalcus lanceolatus (Roth) Parl.; Serrafalcus macrostachys (Desf.) Parl.; Zerna macrostachys (Desf.) Panz.

= Bromus lanceolatus =

Species of flowering plant

Bromus lanceolatus, the Mediterranean brome, large-headed brome or lanceolate brome, is a species of flowering plant in the family Poaceae. It is native to the Mediterranean, the Caucasus, the Middle East, Central Asia, Xinjiang in China, Afghanistan and Pakistan. A tetraploid, it does well in disturbed habitats and has been introduced to scattered locations in North America, South America, and central Europe.
