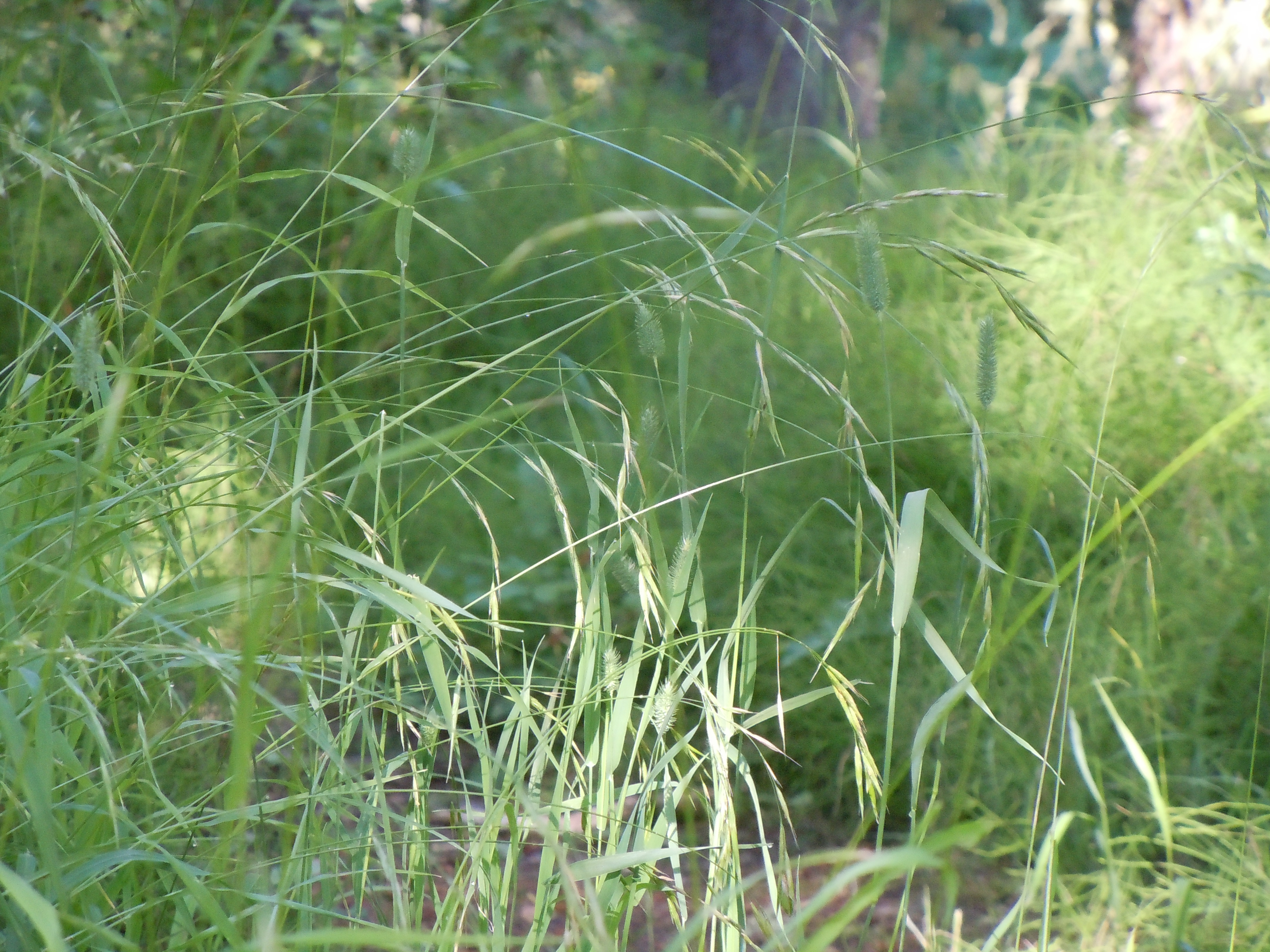

Scientific classification
- Kingdom: Plantae
- Clade: Tracheophytes
- Clade: Angiosperms
- Clade: Monocots
- Clade: Commelinids
- Order: Poales
- Family: Poaceae
- Subfamily: Pooideae
- Genus: Bromus
- Species: B. vulgaris

Binomial name
- Bromus vulgaris (Hook.) Shear

= Bromus vulgaris =

Species of flowering plant

Bromus vulgaris is a species of brome grass known by the common name Columbia brome.

== Distribution ==
It is native to western North America from British Columbia to California to Wyoming, where it grows in many types of habitat, including temperate coniferous forest.

== Description ==
It is a perennial grass which may reach 1.1 meters in height. The inflorescence is an open array of spikelets, the lower ones drooping or nodding. The spikelets are flattened and have awns each up to a centimeter long at the tips of the fruits. This grass is considered a good forage for livestock and wild grazing animals.
