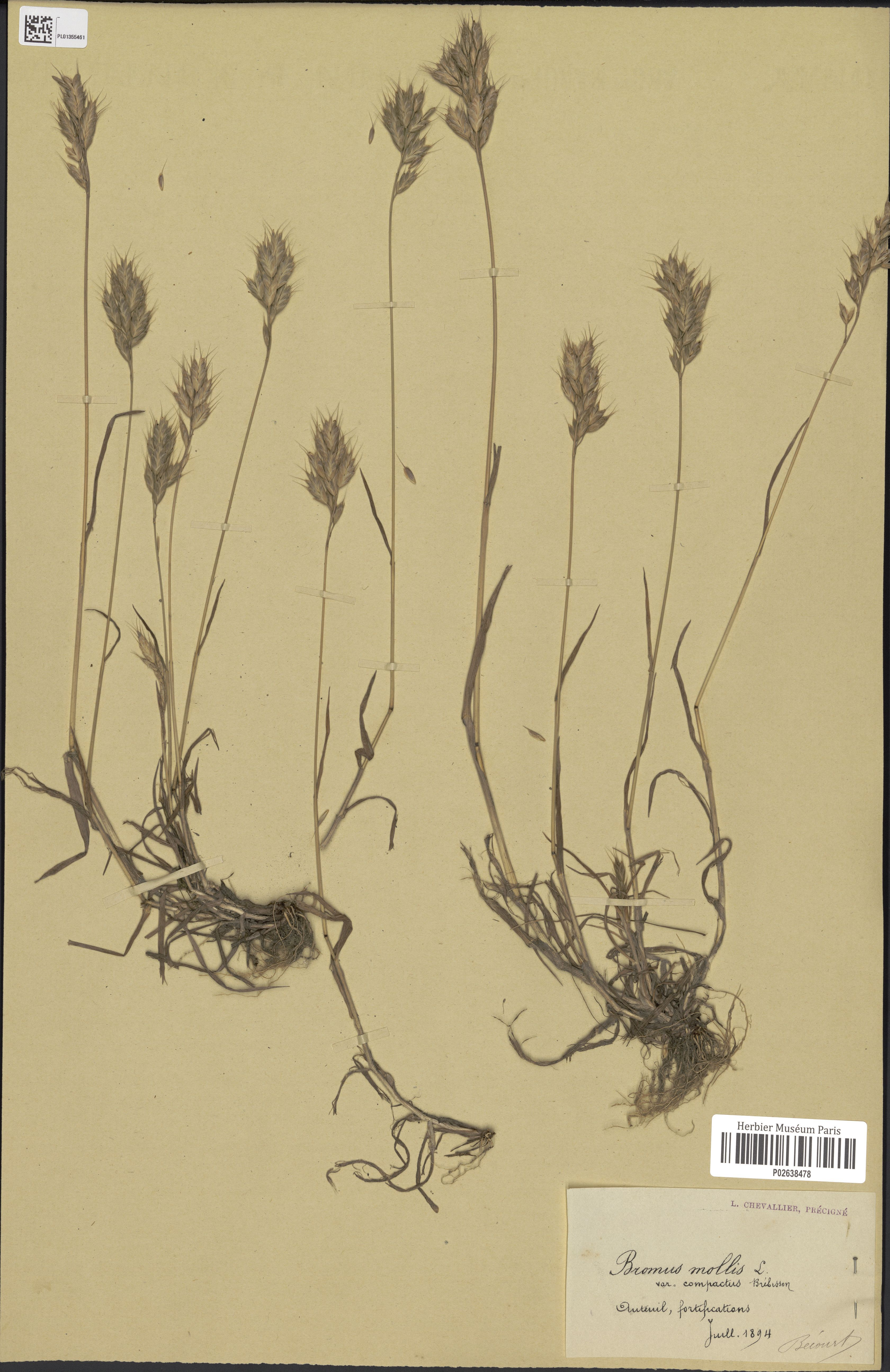
- Herbarium specimen

Scientific classification
- Kingdom: Plantae
- Clade: Tracheophytes
- Clade: Angiosperms
- Clade: Monocots
- Clade: Commelinids
- Order: Poales
- Family: Poaceae
- Subfamily: Pooideae
- Genus: Bromus
- Species: B. lepidus

Binomial name
- Bromus lepidus Holmb.

Synonyms
- List: Bromus bidentatus Holmstr. & H.Scholz; Bromus britannicus I.A.Williams; Bromus gracilis Krösche; Bromus hordeaceus subsp. lepidus (Holmb.) A.Pedersen; Bromus incisus R.Otto & H.Scholz; Bromus oostachys Bornm.

= Bromus lepidus =

Species of flowering plant

Bromus lepidus, the slender soft brome, is a species of flowering plant in the family Poaceae. It has a disjunct distribution, native to central and northern Europe, and Xinjiang in China, and introduced to an assortment of other locales, including some northeast states of the United States, the Canary Islands, and Egypt. The taxonomic history of this species has been marked by nomenclatural issues.
