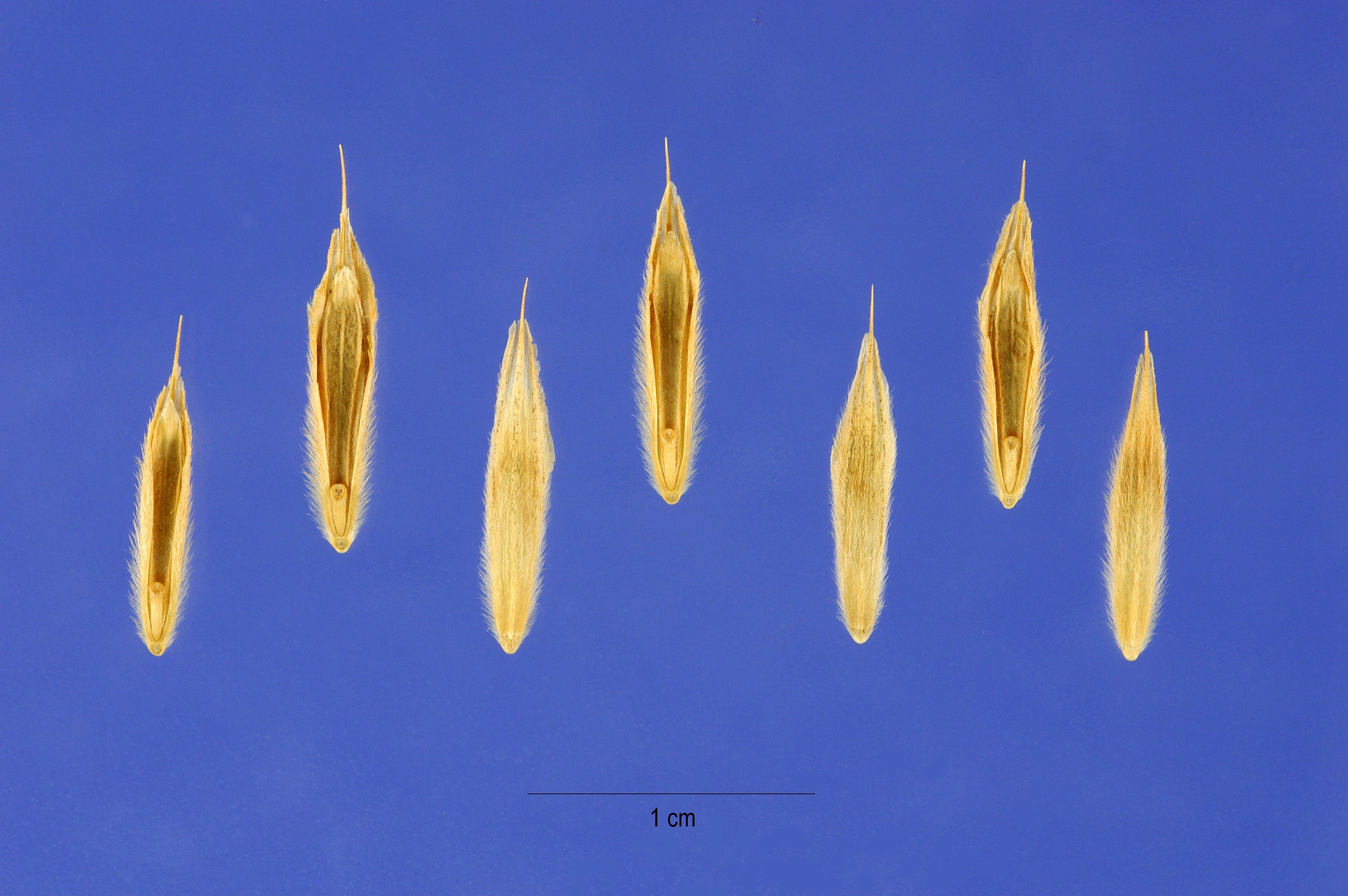

Conservation status
- Secure (NatureServe)

Scientific classification
- Kingdom: Plantae
- Clade: Tracheophytes
- Clade: Angiosperms
- Clade: Monocots
- Clade: Commelinids
- Order: Poales
- Family: Poaceae
- Subfamily: Pooideae
- Genus: Bromus
- Species: B. anomalus

Binomial name
- Bromus anomalus Rupr. ex E.Fourn.

Synonyms
- Bromus ciliatus var. minor Munro ex L.H.Dewey; Bromus kalmii var. major Vasey ex Beal; Bromus porteri var. havardii Shear; Zerna anomala (Rupr. ex E.Fourn.) Henrard; Bromus meyeri Swallen; Bromopsis anomala (Rupr. ex E.Fourn.) Holub

= Bromus anomalus =

Species of grass

Bromus anomalus, commonly known as nodding brome or the Mexican brome, is a species of perennial grass in the family Poaceae. It can be found in US states such as New Mexico and Texas and also in Canadian provinces such as Alberta, British Columbia, and Saskatchewan.

== Description ==
Bromus anomalus grows in tufts with culms 45–75 cm (18–30 in) tall. Its leaf sheaths are pilose, but its ligules are hairless. The surfaces of its leaf blades are rough and scabrous, with hairs on both sides. Its inflorescence is an open, lanceolate panicle growing 10–15 cm (3.9–5.9 in) long. The branches of the panicle are wavy and lightly hairy, with the main branches usually drooping. The spikelets on the panicle are solitary. Fertile spikelets have pedicels, with seven to nine florets. At maturity the spikelets break up and disarticulate below each floret. The glumes are shorter than the spikelets. Both upper and lower glumes are lanceolate and glabrous or slightly hairy.

Bromus anomalus can be distinguished from the similar Bromus porteri by the presence of auricles in B. anomalus, as well as the midribs of its culm leaves narrowing below the collar.

== Distribution and habitat ==
Bromus anomalus typically grows in temperate areas. Its native range is through Central America to the southern United States, from Panama up to Arizona and Texas.
