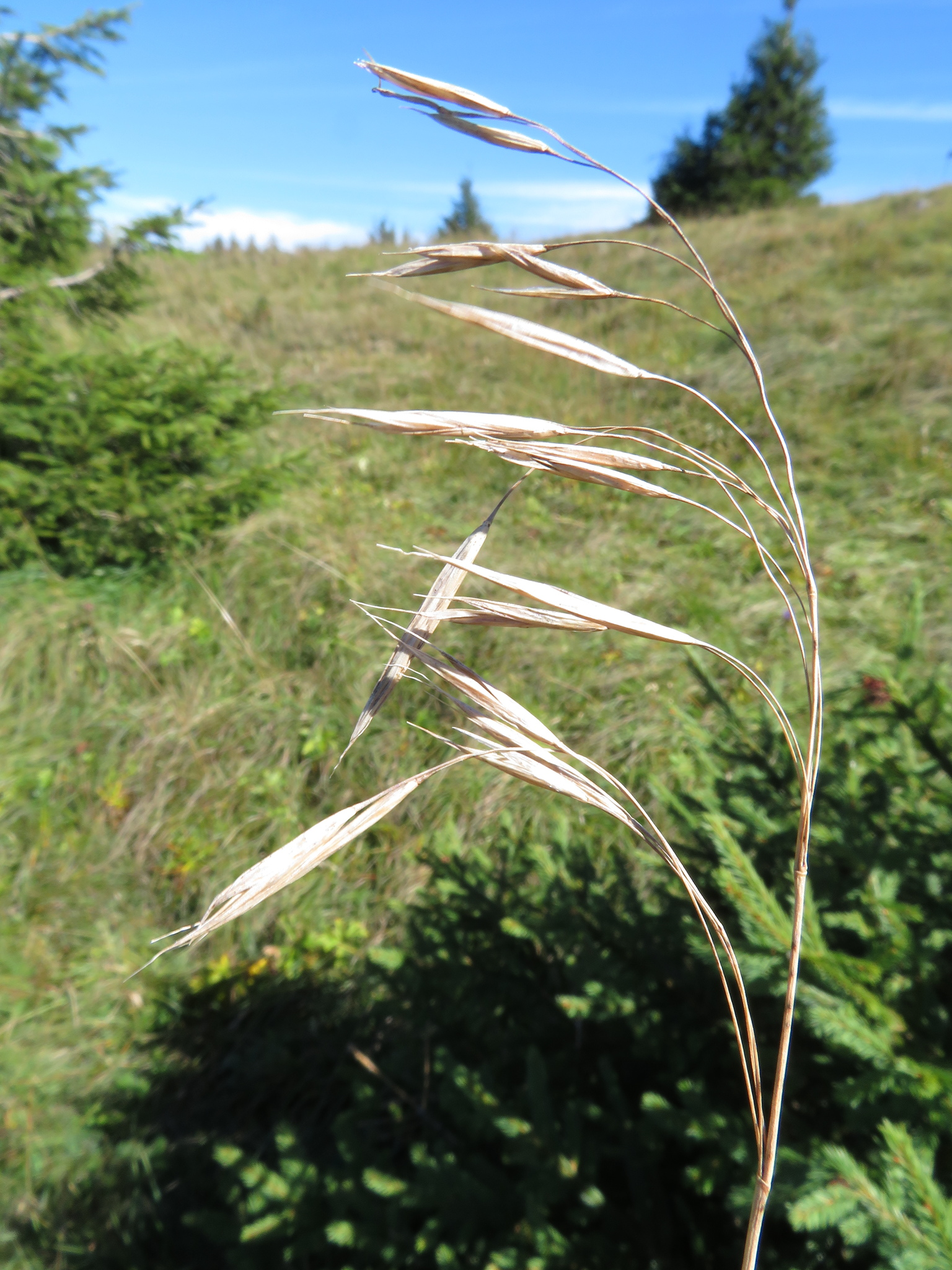
- Bromus pannonicus subsp. monocladus

Scientific classification
- Kingdom: Plantae
- Clade: Tracheophytes
- Clade: Angiosperms
- Clade: Monocots
- Clade: Commelinids
- Order: Poales
- Family: Poaceae
- Subfamily: Pooideae
- Genus: Bromus
- Species: B. pannonicus

Binomial name
- Bromus pannonicus Kumm. & Sendtn.

Synonyms
- Bromus reptans Borbás

= Bromus pannonicus =

Species of grass

Bromus pannonicus is a species of flowering plant in the family Poaceae which can be found in Europe, including Czech Republic, Hungary, Romania, and all states of former Yugoslavia.

== Description ==
The height of a plant is 30–70 centimetres (12–28 in) while its leaves are 2–3 millimetres (0.079–0.118 in) wide. It also has an open panicle which can either be lanceolate or oblong and is measured to be 8–12 centimetres (3.1–4.7 in) in length. The spikelets which are 14–20 millimetres (0.55–0.79 in) in length are also oblong and have 5-7 fertile florets.
