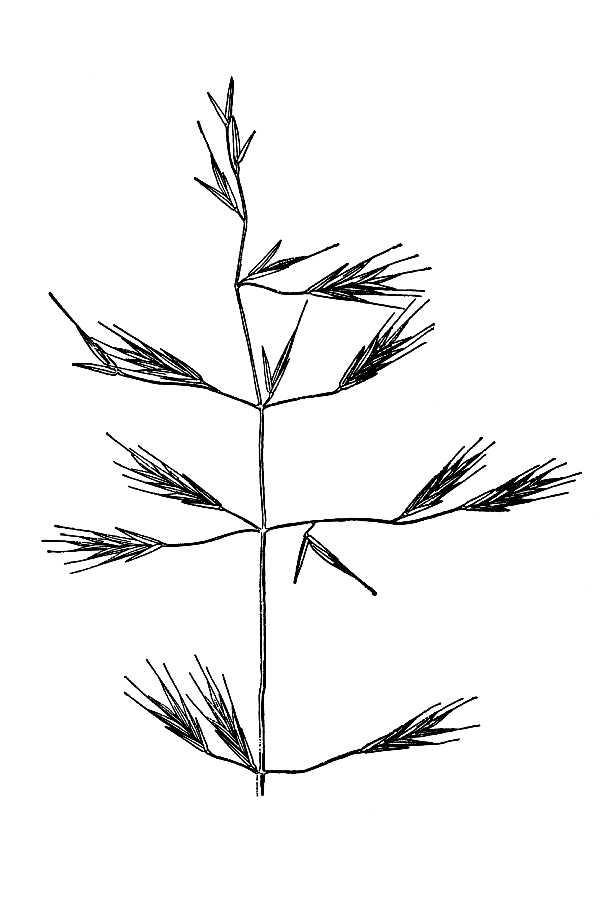

Scientific classification
- Kingdom: Plantae
- Clade: Tracheophytes
- Clade: Angiosperms
- Clade: Monocots
- Clade: Commelinids
- Order: Poales
- Family: Poaceae
- Subfamily: Pooideae
- Genus: Bromus
- Species: B. orcuttianus

Binomial name
- Bromus orcuttianus Vasey

= Bromus orcuttianus =

Species of flowering plant

Bromus orcuttianus is a species of brome grass known by the common name Orcutt's brome.

== Distribution ==
It is native to western North America from Washington to Baja California, where it grows in many types of habitat.

== Description ==
It is a perennial grass which may reach 1.6 meters in height. The inflorescence is an open array of spikelets, the lower ones drooping or nodding. The spikelets are flattened and have short awns at the tips of the fruits.
