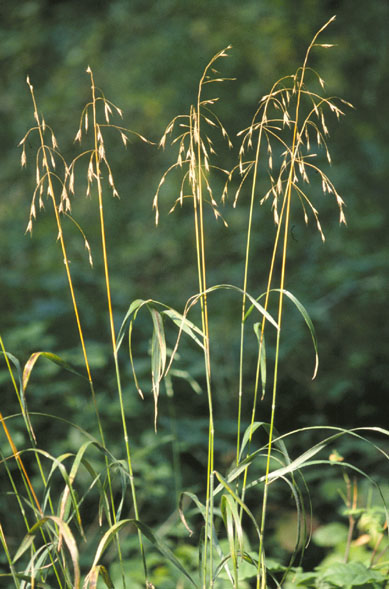
- Bromus pubescens

Scientific classification
- Kingdom: Plantae
- Clade: Embryophytes
- Clade: Tracheophytes
- Clade: Spermatophytes
- Clade: Angiosperms
- Clade: Monocots
- Clade: Commelinids
- Order: Poales
- Family: Poaceae
- Clade: BOP clade
- Subfamily: Pooideae
- Supertribe: Triticodae
- Tribe: Bromeae; Dumort. (1824)
- Genus: Bromus; Scop.

Sections
- Bromopsis; Bromus; Ceratochloa; Genea; Neobromus

Synonyms
- Anisantha K.Koch; Avenaria Heist. ex Fabr.; Bromopsis (Dumort.) Fourr.; Calliagrostis Ehrh.; Ceratochloa P.Beauv.; Euraphis (Trin.) Kuntze; Forasaccus Bubani; Genea (Dumort.) Dumort.; Michelaria Dumort.; Nevskiella V.I.Krecz. & Vved.; Serrafalcus Parl.; Stenofestuca (Honda) Nakai; Triniusa Steud.; Trisetobromus Nevski

= Bromus =

Genus of grasses

Bromus is a large genus of grasses, classified in its own tribe Bromeae. They are commonly known as bromes, brome grasses, cheat grasses, or chess grasses. Estimates in the scientific literature of the number of species have ranged from 100 to 400, but plant taxonomists currently recognize around 160–170 species.

Bromus is part of the cool-season grass lineage (subfamily Pooideae), which includes about 3300 species. Within Pooideae, Bromus is classified in tribe Bromeae (it is the only genus in the tribe). Bromus is closely related to the wheat-grass lineage (tribe Triticeae) that includes such economically important genera as Triticum (wheat), Hordeum (barley) and Secale (rye).

== Etymology ==
The generic name Bromus is derived from the Latin bromos, a borrowed word from the Ancient Greek βρόμος (brómos). βρόμος and bromos mean oats, but βρόμος seems to have referred specifically to Avena sativa (Hippocrates On Regimen in Acute Diseases 2.43, Dioscorides Medicus 2.94, Polemo Historicus 88) and Avena barbata (Theophrastus Historia Plantarum 8.9.2, Pseudo-Dioscorides 4.137). The generic name comes from avēna, a native Latin word for "oats" or "wild oats".

== Description ==
Bromus species occur in many habitats in temperate regions of the world, including Africa, America, Australia and Eurasia. There are considerable morphological differences between some species, while the morphological differences between others (usually those species that are closely related) are subtle and difficult to distinguish. As such, the taxonomy of the genus is complicated.

Bromus is distinguished from other grass genera by a combination of several morphological characteristics, including leaf sheaths that are closed (connate) for most of their length, awns that are usually inserted subapically, and hairy appendages on the ovary. The leaf blades and sheaths, which comprise the leaves can be hairless, sparsely hairy or hairy. The inflorescence is a dense or open panicle, usually drooping or nodding, sometimes spreading (as in Japanese brome, B. japonicus).

== Ecology ==
The caterpillars of some Lepidoptera use Bromus as a foodplant, such as the chequered skipper (Carterocephalus palaemon).

== Uses ==
Bromus species are generally considered to have little economic value to humans, at least in present times. Bromus mango was historically cultivated in Chile and Argentina by indigenous peoples, who used it both as fodder and food. The Tarahumara Indians in northern Mexico use the grains of some native Bromus species to aid fermentation in making one of their cultural beverages. As names like poverty brome (B. sterilis) and ripgut brome (B. diandrus) attest, some species are not very useful as fodder because their leaves sclerotize quickly and may even be harmful to livestock due to the high silica content. Others, such as meadow brome (Bromus riparius), native to parts of Russia, are planted as forage in the Great Plains of North America. Brome grasses are not usually grown as ornamental plants due to most species' nondescript appearance. Some are useful to prevent erosion but such use must be cautiously controlled as most Bromus have the ability to spread, becoming invasive weeds. Cheatgrass (Bromus tectorum) is a particularly troublesome weed across much of western North America (from southern British Columbia to California.)

== Taxonomy and systematics ==
Taxonomists have generated various classification schemes to reflect the morphological variation that is seen in Bromus. In North America, five morphologically similar groups of species, called sections, are generally recognized: Bromus, Genea, Ceratochloa, Neobromus, and Bromopsis. Sections Bromus and Genea are native to the Old World (Eurasia), but many species are introduced into North America. Sections Bromopsis, Neobromus, and Ceratochloa have several native species in North America.

=== Selected species ===
- Bromus aleutensis – Aleutian brome
- Bromus alopecuros – weedy brome
- Bromus anomalus – nodding brome
- Bromus arenarius – Australian brome
- Bromus arizonicus – Arizona brome
- Bromus arvensis – field brome
- Bromus berteroanus – Chilean chess (B. berterianus is a common lapsus)
- Bromus biebersteinii – meadow brome
- Bromus brevis
- Bromus briziformis – rattlesnake brome, quake grass
- Bromus bromoideus – Ardennes brome, brome of the Ardennes
- Bromus carinatus – California brome, mountain brome
- Bromus cabrerensis – Cabrera brome
- Bromus catharticus – rescuegrass, Australian oat
- Bromus ciliatus – fringed brome (syn. B. canadensis)
  - Bromus ciliatus subsp. ciliatus
  - Bromus ciliatus subsp. richardsonii
- Bromus commutatus – meadow brome
- Bromus danthoniae
- Bromus diandrus – great brome, ripgut brome
- Bromus erectus – upright brome, erect brome, meadow brome
- Bromus exaltatus
- Bromus fibrosus
- Bromus frigidus
- Bromus frondosus – weeping brome
- Bromus grandis – tall brome
- Bromus grossus – great rye brome, whiskered brome
- Bromus hordeaceus – soft brome, bull grass, soft cheat, soft chess
  - Bromus hordeaceus subsp. ferronii – least soft brome
  - Bromus hordeaceus subsp. hordeaceus
  - Bromus hordeaceus subsp. molliformis
  - Bromus hordeaceus subsp. pseudothominii
  - Bromus hordeaceus subsp. thominei – lesser soft brome
- Bromus inermis – Hungarian brome
  - Bromus inermis subsp. inermis – awnless brome
    - Bromus inermis subsp. inermis var. divaricatus
    - Bromus inermis subsp. inermis var. inermis
  - Bromus inermis subsp. pumpellianus – Pumpelly's brome
    - Bromus inermis subsp. pumpellianus var. arcticus
    - Bromus inermis subsp. pumpellianus var. pumpellianus
- Bromus interruptus – interrupted brome
- Bromus japonicus – Japanese brome
- Bromus kalmii – Kalm's brome, prairie brome
- Bromus kinabaluensis
- Bromus koeieanus
- Bromus kopetdagensis
- Bromus laevipes – Chinook brome
- Bromus lanatipes – woolly brome
- Bromus lanceolatus – Mediterranean brome
- Bromus latiglumis – earlyleaf brome
- Bromus lepidus – slender soft brome
- Bromus luzonensis – hoary brome
- Bromus macrostachys
- Bromus madritensis – compact brome
  - Bromus madritensis subsp. rubens – red brome, foxtail brome
- Bromus mango – mango brome
- Bromus marginatus – mountain brome
- Bromus maritimus – seaside brome
- Bromus mucroglumis – sharpglume brome
- Bromus nottowayanus – Nottoway Valley brome
- Bromus orcuttianus – Orcutt's brome
- Bromus pacificus – Pacific brome
- Bromus pannonicus
- Bromus polyanthus – Great Basin brome
  - Bromus polyanthus subsp. paniculatus
  - Bromus polyanthus subsp. polyanthus
- Bromus porteri – Porter brome
- Bromus pseudolaevipes – Coast Range brome
- Bromus pseudosecalinus – false rye brome
- Bromus pseudothominii – hybrid soft brome
- Bromus pubescens – hairy woodland brome
- Bromus ramosus – hairy brome
  - Bromus ramosus subsp. benekii – lesser hairy brome
  - Bromus ramosus subsp. ramosus – smooth brome
- Bromus rigidus – stiff brome, ripgut brome
- Bromus scoparius – broom brome
- Bromus secalinus – rye brome
- Bromus sitchensis – Alaska brome
- Bromus squarrosus – rough brome, corn brome
- Bromus stamineus – roadside brome
- Bromus sterilis – barren brome, poverty brome, sterile brome grass
- Bromus suksdorfii – Suksdorf's brome
- Bromus tectorum – drooping brome, downy brome
- Bromus texensis – Texas brome
- Bromus vulgaris – Columbia brome
- Bromus willdenowii – rescue brome

== Gallery ==
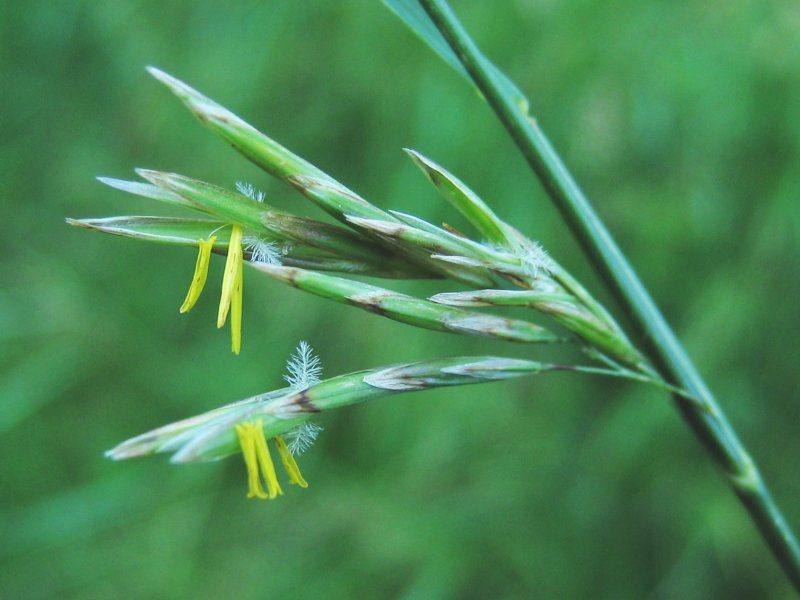
awnless brome (B. inermis) flowers

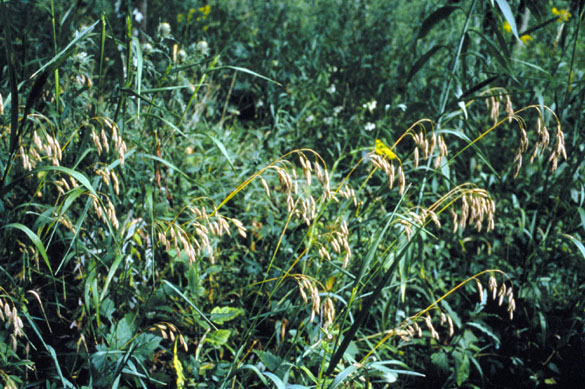
Arctic brome
B. kalmii

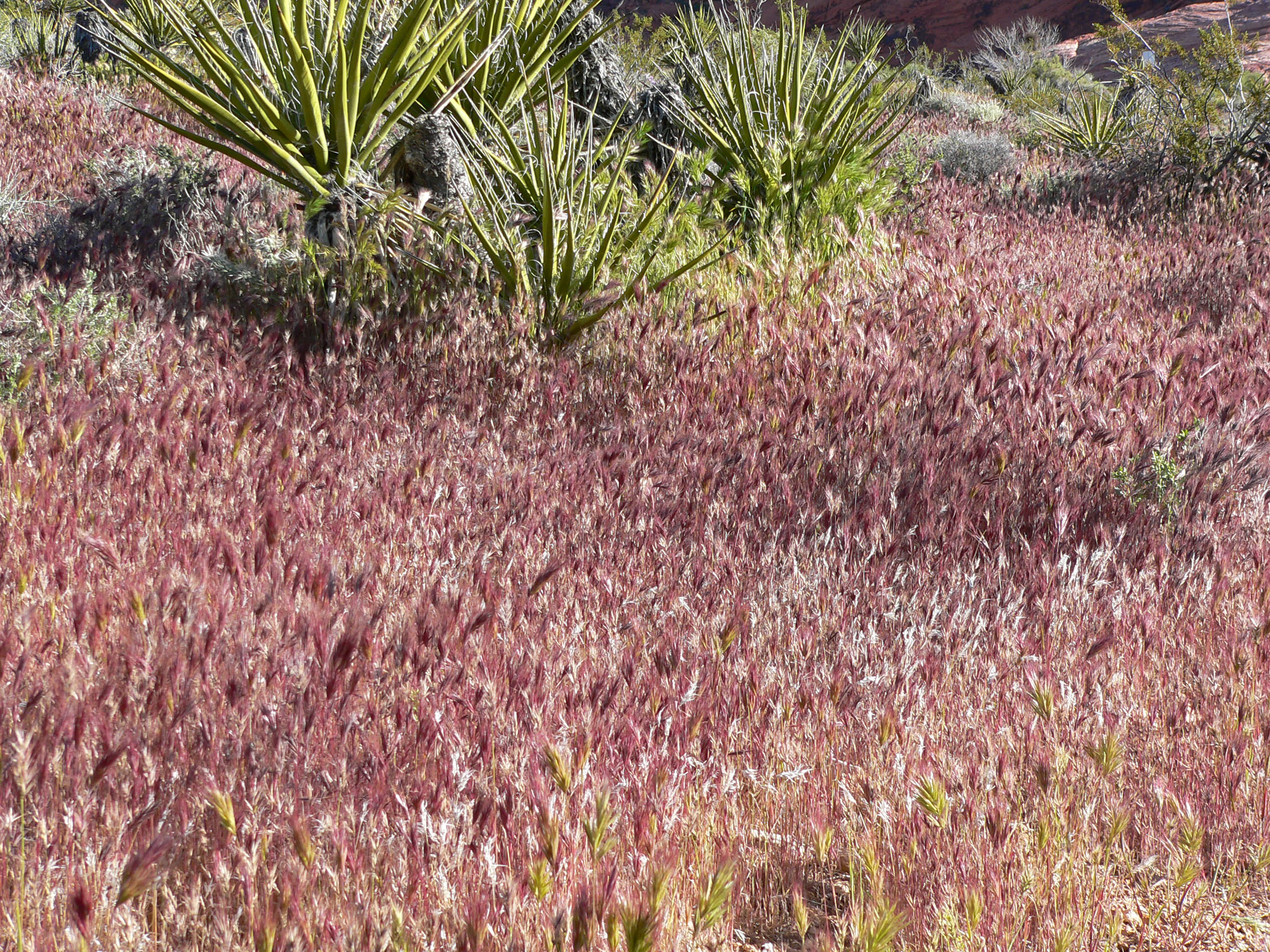
red brome
B madritensis ssp. rubens

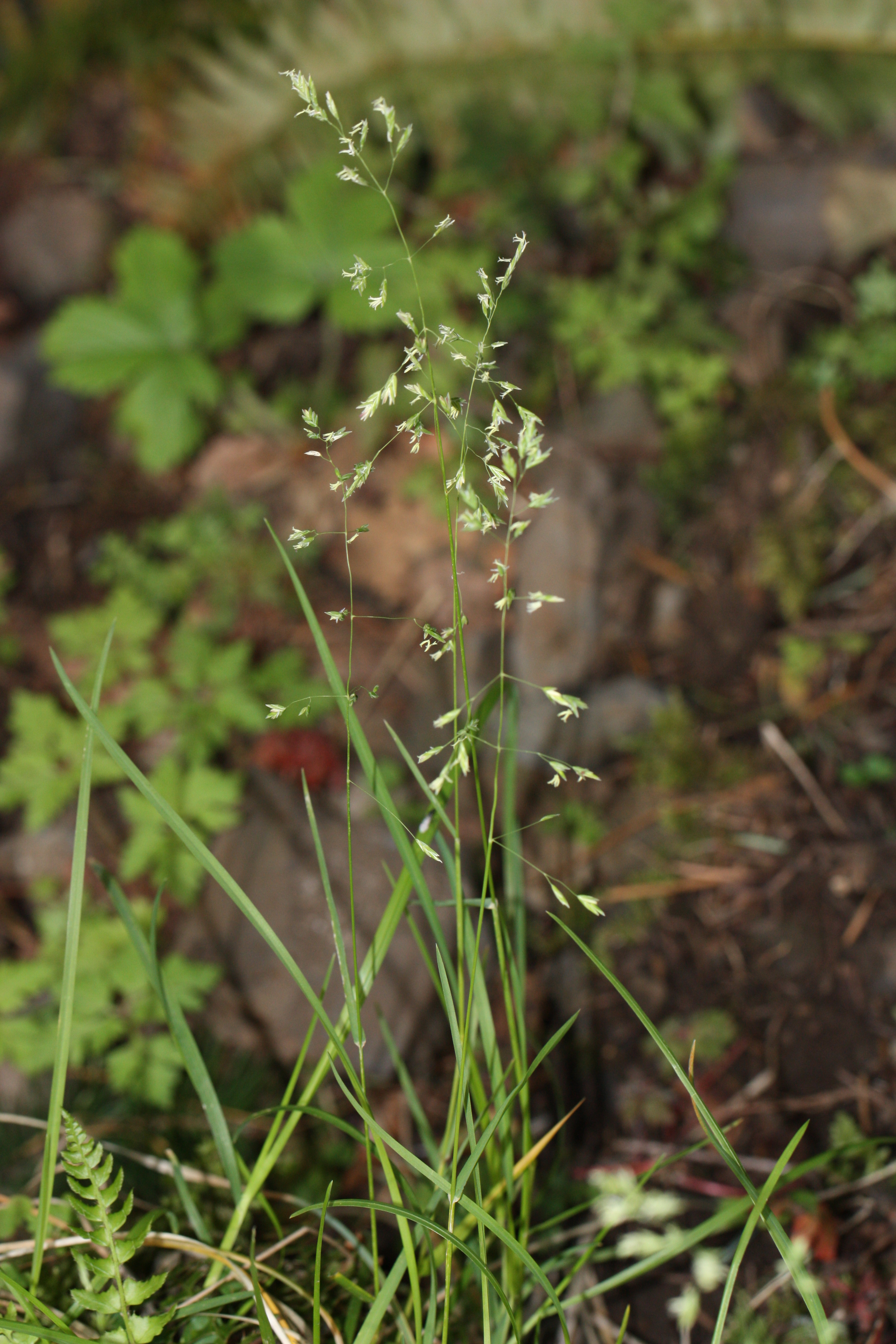
Alaska brome
B. rigidus

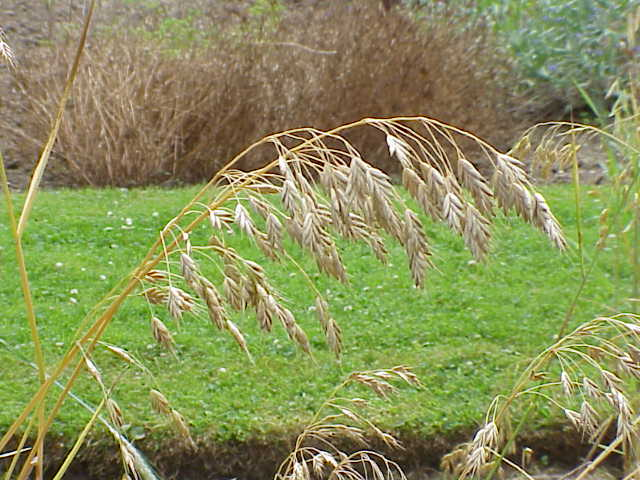
rye brome (B. secalinus) flowers

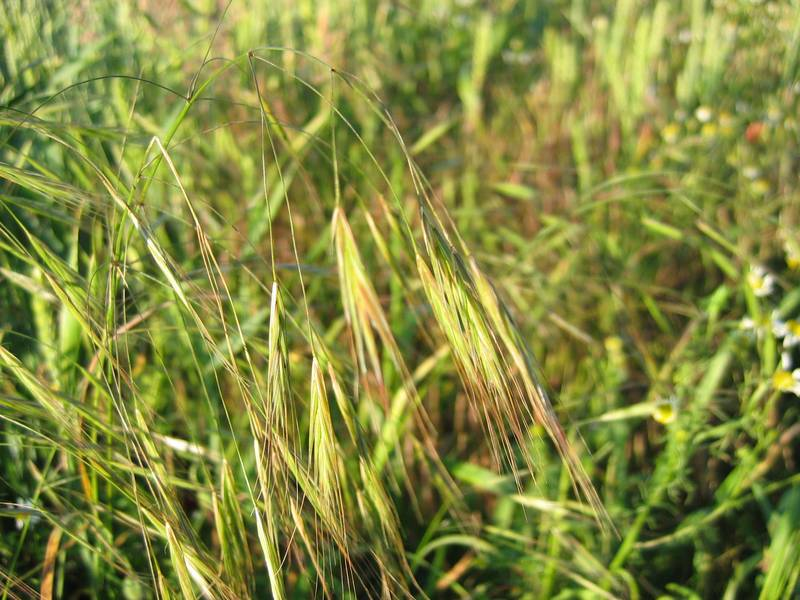
barren brome
B. sterilis

== See also ==
- List of Poaceae genera
