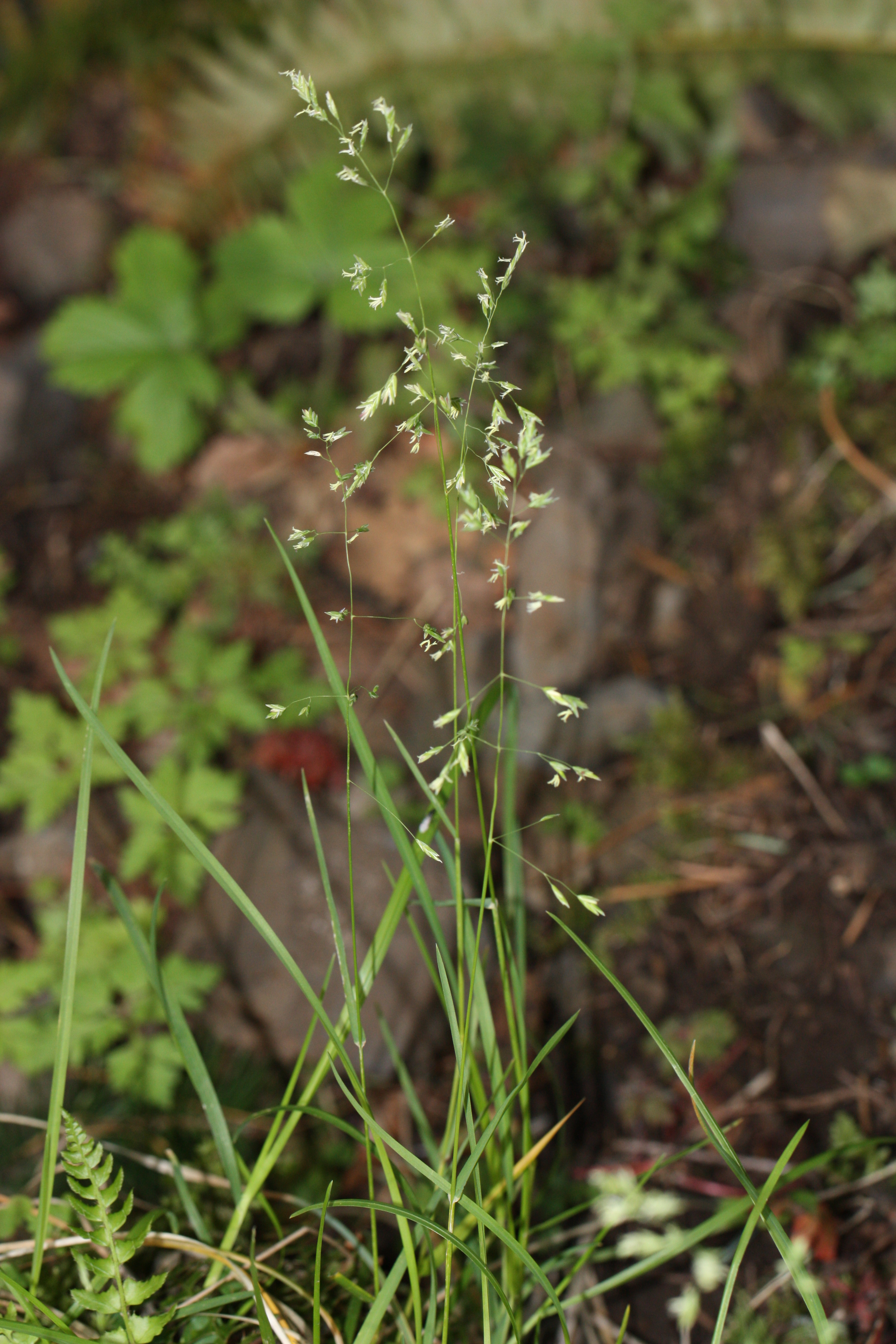

Scientific classification
- Kingdom: Plantae
- Clade: Tracheophytes
- Clade: Angiosperms
- Clade: Monocots
- Clade: Commelinids
- Order: Poales
- Family: Poaceae
- Subfamily: Pooideae
- Genus: Bromus
- Species: B. sitchensis

Binomial name
- Bromus sitchensis Trin.

= Bromus sitchensis =

Species of grass

Bromus sitchenis, the Alaska brome, is a perennial grass native to the North Pacific coast of North America, in woods and banks from Alaska to Oregon. It can grow up to 1.8 m tall, but is often shorter. Leaf blades are elongate, 7–12 mm wide, and as much as 35 cm long. Spikelets 2.5 to 3.5 cm long with between 6 and 12 flowers, awn is 5 to 10 mm long.

The grass has winter dormancy, and is intolerant of aluminum in the soil. There is some utility as a forage crop in cooler, wetter regions.

The species appears to have been naturalized in Belgium as well as New Zealand.
