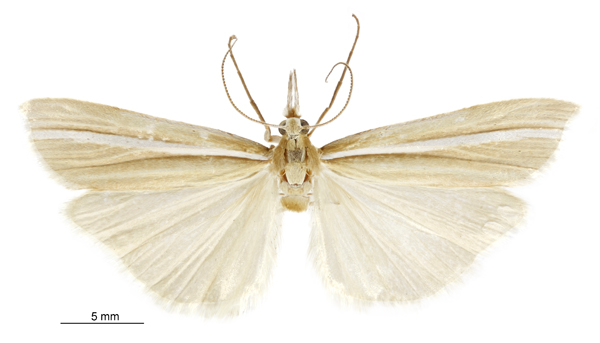
- Male

Scientific classification
- Kingdom: Animalia
- Phylum: Arthropoda
- Clade: Pancrustacea
- Class: Insecta
- Order: Lepidoptera
- Family: Crambidae
- Subfamily: Crambinae
- Tribe: Crambini
- Genus: Orocrambus
- Species: O. abditus

Binomial name
- Orocrambus abditus (Philpott, 1924)

Synonyms
- Crambus abditus Philpott, 1924

= Orocrambus abditus =

Species of moth, endemic to New Zealand

Orocrambus abditus is a moth of the family Crambidae. It was first described by Alfred Philpott in 1924. It is endemic to New Zealand and can be found in Marlborough, Arthur's Pass, and in Canterbury. The species inhabits grassland including tussock grassland and shrubland. Larvae have been collected in October and the adults of this species are on the wing from October to March.

== Taxonomy ==
O. abditus was described by Alfred Philpott in 1924 using a specimen captive bred from a larva collected by Charles Lindsay in October at Otarama, in the Selwyn District. He originally named the species Crambus abditus. George Hudson, in his 1928 book The butterflies and moths of New Zealand, discussed and illustrated this species under that name. In 1975 D. E. Gaskin revised New Zealand Crambini and placed this species in the genus Orocrambus. This placement was followed by John S. Dugdale in 1988 and in the New Zealand Inventory of Biodiversity. The female holotype (the sex was wrongly recorded by Philpott) is held at the Canterbury Museum.

== Description ==
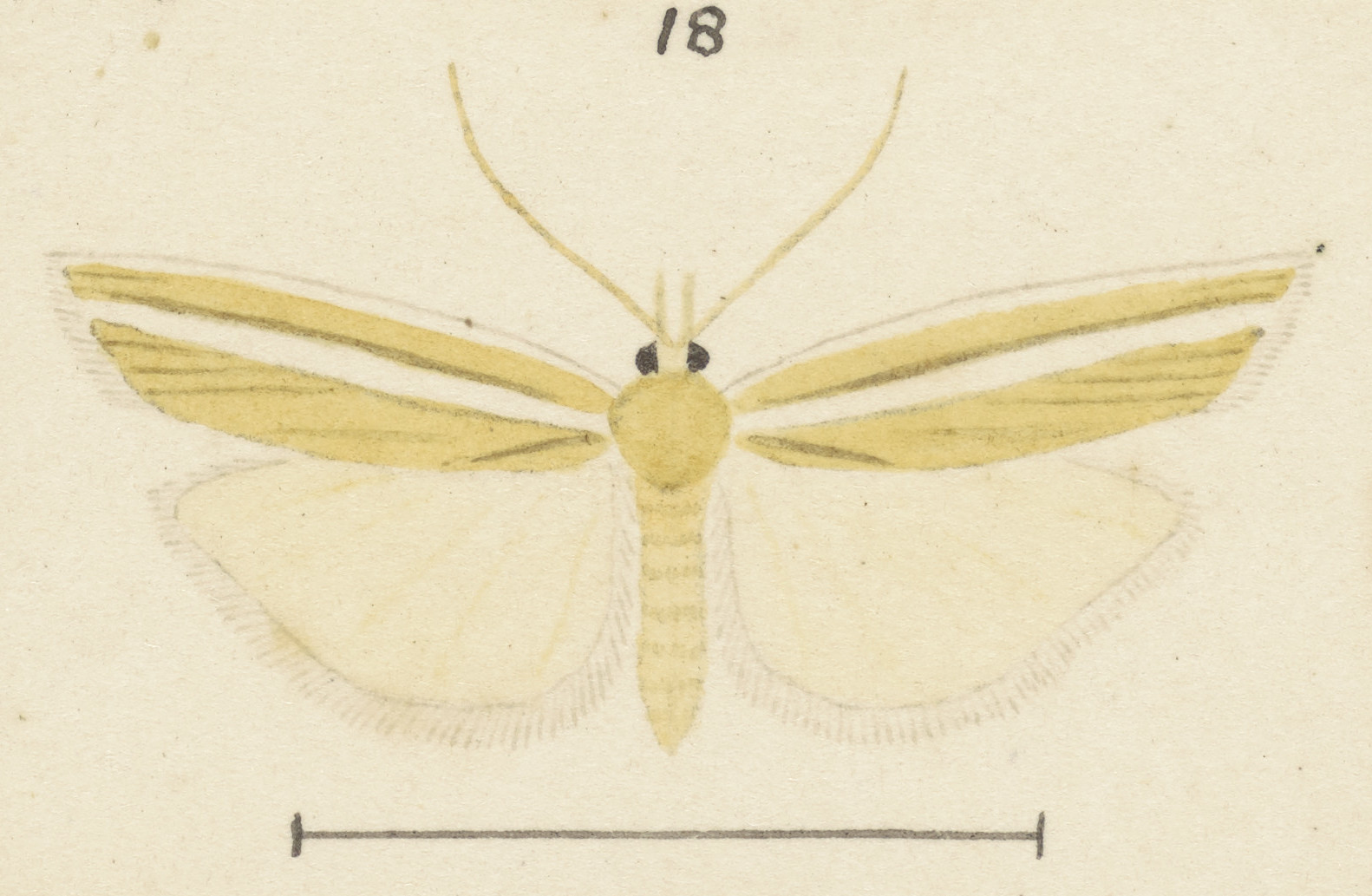
Illustration of female by Hudson.

Philpott described the female of the species as follows:

27 mm. Head ochreous-white. Labial palpi 4, ochreous-white. Maxilliary palpi white. Antemiae ochreous-white. TJjorax brassy-yellow. Abdomen and legs whitish-ochreous. Forewings moderate, costa evenly arched, apex acute, termen almost straight, very oblique; brassy-yellow; costa margined throughout with white; a straight well-defined white median longitudinal stripe, margined with fuscous above except near base, and more narrowly beneath on basal half; some obscure white terminal streaks above median streak : cilia white. Hindwings white, faintly tinged with ochreous : cilia white.

The female species have forewings that are differently shaped than the male with the top part of the forewings being more acute. Both the male and the female of this species tend to be yellower than their closely related sister species but not consistently so. As a result this species can only be separated from O. simplex, O. lewisi, O. ordishi, or O. crenaeus by studying the genitalia of the specimens.

== Distribution ==
This species is endemic to New Zealand. O. abditus has been recorded in Marlborough, Arthur's Pass, and in Canterbury in areas such as Porter's Pass, Kowhai River, Opuha, Gapes Valley, Birdling's Flat and Rakaia Island. Gaskin hypothesised that the distribution of this species may have come about as a result of O. abditus surviving in the eastern part of the Nelson/Marlborough during the Otiran glaciation. Gaskin suggested that the restriction in southernly spread of this species may be as a result of competition with its southerly sister species O.ordishi or alternatively as a result of an as yet unknown environmental factor.

== Habitat ==
This species inhabits grassland including tussock grassland and shrubland.

== Behaviour ==
Larvae have been collected in October. Adults have been recorded on wing from October to March. Gaskin hypothesised that the length of this flight period may suggest that this species has two broods in a year.
