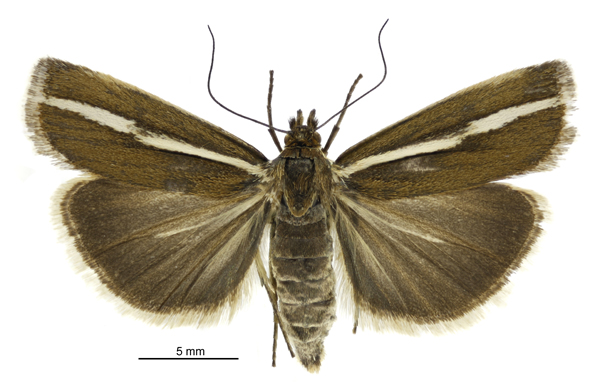
- Male

Scientific classification
- Kingdom: Animalia
- Phylum: Arthropoda
- Clade: Pancrustacea
- Class: Insecta
- Order: Lepidoptera
- Family: Crambidae
- Genus: Orocrambus
- Species: O. catacaustus

Binomial name
- Orocrambus catacaustus (Meyrick, 1885)

Synonyms
- Crambus catacaustus Meyrick, 1885; Orocrambus pervius Meyrick, 1912

= Orocrambus catacaustus =

Species of moth endemic to New Zealand

Orocrambus catacaustus is a moth in the family Crambidae. It was described by Edward Meyrick in 1885. This species is endemic to New Zealand and has been recorded from the South Island. This species can be found in the subalpine zones as well as in mountain valleys and frequents swampy or boggy habitat or open limestone valleys. Adult moths are day flying and have been observed from December until March.

== Taxonomy ==
This species was first described in 1885 by Edward Meyrick and originally named Crambus catacaustus. Meyrick went on to give a more detailed description later in 1885. In May 1888 Meyrick placed this species in the genus Orocrambus. In 1912 Meyrick, thinking he was describing a new species, named this moth Orocrambus pervius. George Hudson discussed and illustrated this species under this name in his 1928 book The butterflies and moths of New Zealand. Hudson also discussed O. pervius in his 1951 book Fragments of New Zealand entomology arguing that this species should be considered a form of O. catacaustus. In 1962 Bleszynski and Collins synonymised O. pervius with O. catacaustus. D. E. Gaskin reexamined O. catacaustus discussing and illustrating it under this name in 1975 and confirmed the synonymisation of O. pervius. John S. Dugdale also discussed this species under this name in 1988. The male lectotype specimen, collected at Arthur's Pass by R. W. Fereday, is held at the Natural History Museum, London.

== Description ==
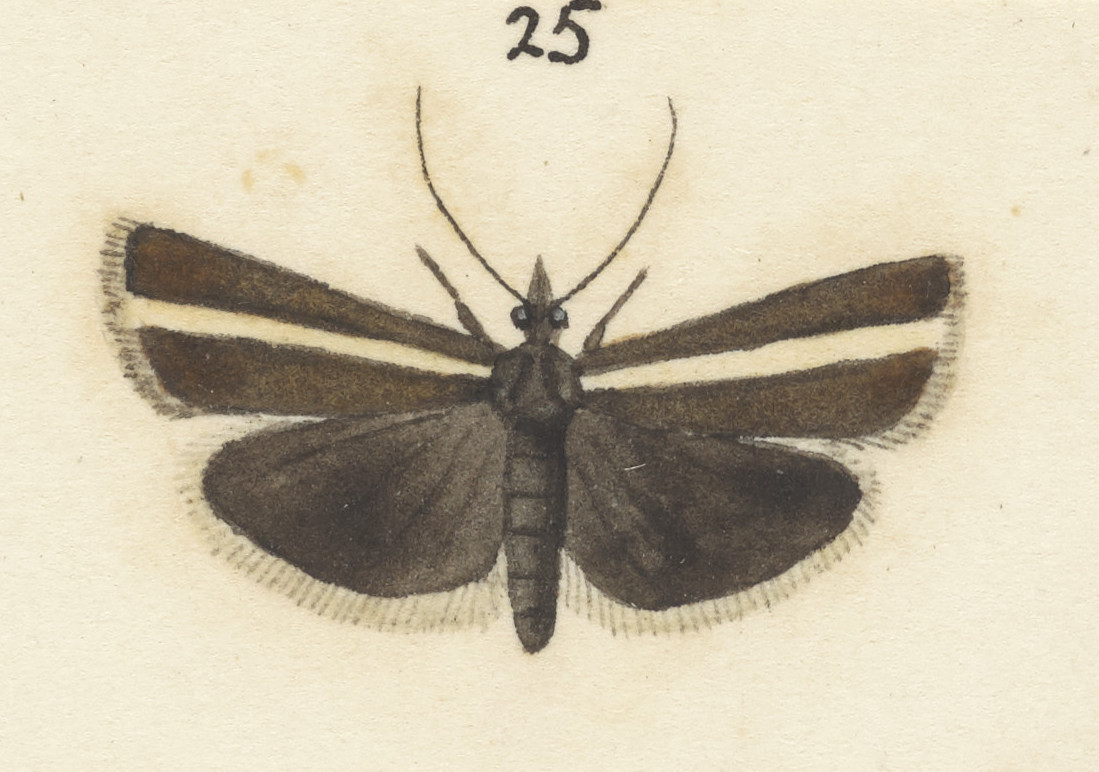
Illustration by Hudson.

The wingspan of the adults of this species is 21–27 mm. Hudson described O. catacaustus as follows:

The expansion of the wings is about 7/8 inch. The fore-wings are dark bronzy-brown with a rather narrow, cream-coloured, straight central longitudinal streak from the base to the termen; the costa is also very narrowly edged with white in the male; the cilia are dark grey with white tips. The hind-wings are very dark grey, with bronzy reflections; the cilia are grey tipped with white.

O. catacaustus is similar in appearance to O. aethonellus but is of a larger size. The most reliable way to distinguish between these two species is via genitalia examination.

== Distribution ==
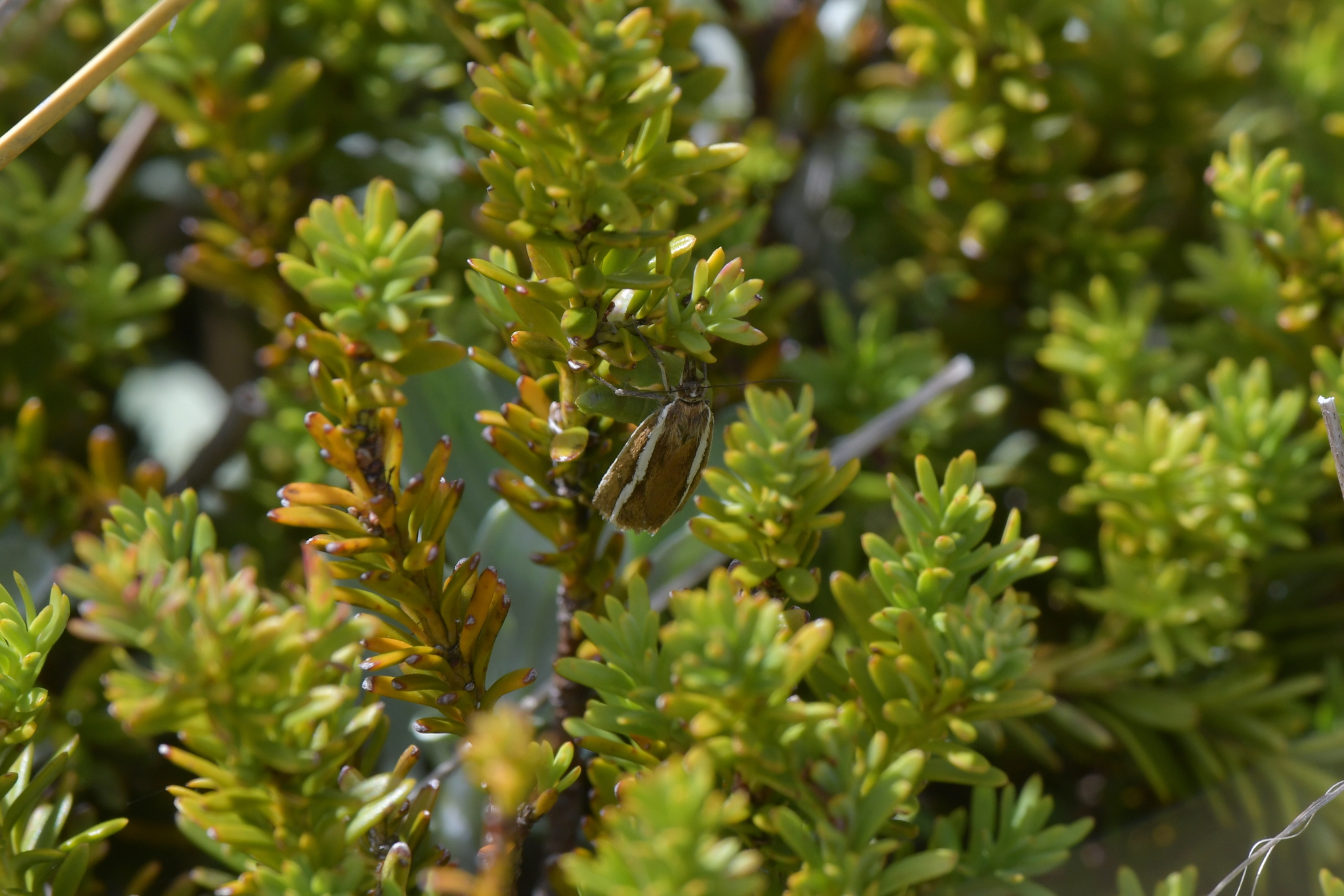
O. catacaustus near Arthur's Pass.

This species is endemic to New Zealand and is found in the South Island.

== Behaviour ==
Adults have been recorded on wing from December to March. They are day flying and are very active in hot sunshine.

== Habitat ==
This species is associated with swampy or boggy habitat or open limestone valleys. It can be found in subalpine habitat.
