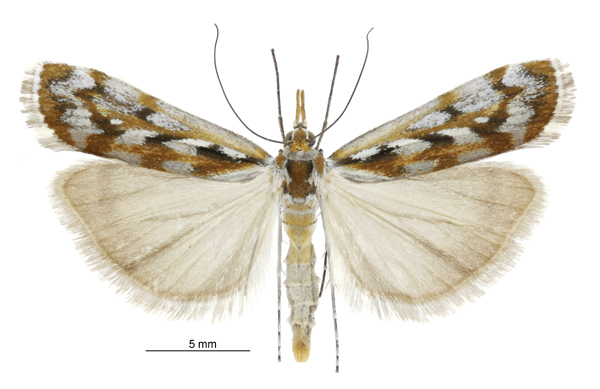
- Female

Scientific classification
- Kingdom: Animalia
- Phylum: Arthropoda
- Clade: Pancrustacea
- Class: Insecta
- Order: Lepidoptera
- Family: Crambidae
- Subfamily: Crambinae
- Tribe: Crambini
- Genus: Orocrambus
- Species: O. xanthogrammus

Binomial name
- Orocrambus xanthogrammus (Meyrick, 1882)

Synonyms
- Crambus xanthogrammus Meyrick, 1882

= Orocrambus xanthogrammus =

Species of moth

Orocrambus xanthogrammus is a moth in the family Crambidae. It was described by Edward Meyrick in 1883. It is endemic to New Zealand, where it has been recorded from the South Island and the eastern part of the North Island. The habitat of this species consists of shingle river beds.

== Taxonomy ==
O. xanthogrammus was first described by Edward Meyrick in June 1882 and named Crambus xanthogrammus. Meyrick gave a fuller description of this species in May 1883. The male lectotype specimen, collected at Lake Coleridge by R. E. Fereday, is held at the Natural History Museum, London.

== Description ==
The wingspan is 20–30 mm. Adults have been recorded on wing from December to March.

== Hosts ==
The larvae probably feed on Raoulia species.
