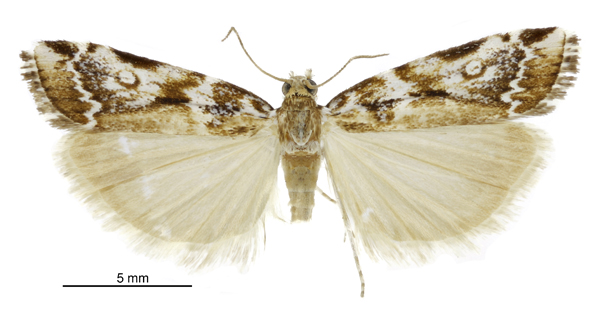
- Male

Conservation status
- Nationally Critical (NZ TCS)

Scientific classification
- Kingdom: Animalia
- Phylum: Arthropoda
- Clade: Pancrustacea
- Class: Insecta
- Order: Lepidoptera
- Family: Crambidae
- Subfamily: Crambinae
- Tribe: Crambini
- Genus: Orocrambus
- Species: O. ornatus

Binomial name
- Orocrambus ornatus (Philpott, 1927)

Synonyms
- Crambus ornatus Philpott, 1927

= Orocrambus ornatus =

Species of moth

Orocrambus ornatus is a moth in the family Crambidae. This species is endemic to New Zealand. It is classified as critically endangered by the Department of Conservation.

== Taxonomy ==
O. ornatus was first described by Alfred Philpott in 1927 using a male specimen he collected in Golden Downs on 8 January 1926. Philpott named the species Crambus ornatus. George Vernon Hudson described and illustrated the species under the same name in 1939. In 1975 David Edward Gaskin assigned Crambus ornatus to the genus Orocrambus.

== Description ==
Philpott described the species as follows:

20 mm. Head and palpi ochreous. Antennae brown. Thorax brown mixed with white. Abdomen whitish-ochreous. Legs white, anterior pair fuscous. Forewings, costa moderately arched, apex blunt-pointed, termen rounded, oblique; brassy brown to chocolate brown; markings white; a basal patch on costa half enclosing a brown area; a broad irregular band at 1/4, not reaching dorsum, outwardly strongly dentate; on fold before this a large spot of mingled blackish and white scales; an elongate black mark about middle of wing at 1/3; a crescentic white area sprinkled with brown on costal half from about 1/3 to 4/5, enclosing an elongate spot of blackish-brown on costal margin; beneath this costal spot a prominent ring of brown enclosing a white area with a central brown dot; second line pure white, dentate, preceded on costa by a small blackish-brown dot and followed by a much larger one; a white area beneath the latter reaching apex; fringes fuscous, irregularly barred with white. Hindwings and fringes pale ochreous-grey.

== Distribution ==
This species is endemic to New Zealand and has been recorded in Golden Downs in the Tasman District as well as in the Nelson district.

== Ecology and habitat ==
O. ornatus appears to prefer forest habitat. Adults have been recorded on wing in January.

== Host plants ==
This species has been found to be associated with plants in the genus Uncinia.

== Conservation status ==
This species has the "Nationally Critical" conservation status under the New Zealand Threat Classification System.
