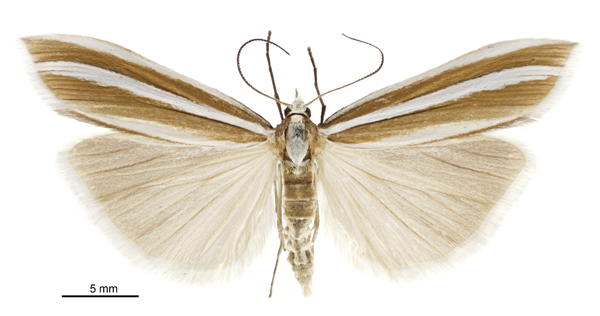
- Male

Scientific classification
- Kingdom: Animalia
- Phylum: Arthropoda
- Clade: Pancrustacea
- Class: Insecta
- Order: Lepidoptera
- Family: Crambidae
- Subfamily: Crambinae
- Tribe: Crambini
- Genus: Orocrambus
- Species: O. isochytus

Binomial name
- Orocrambus isochytus (Meyrick, 1888)

Synonyms
- Crambus isochytus Meyrick, 1888

= Orocrambus isochytus =

Species of moth

Orocrambus isochytus is a moth in the family Crambidae. It was described by Edward Meyrick in 1888. This species is endemic to New Zealand. It is found in the Nelson area as defined by the Crosby codes, the New Zealand Area Codes for recording specimen localities. It has been recorded from Mount Arthur and Mount Peel. The habitat of this species consists of alpine tussock grasslands.

The wingspan is 35–41 mm. Adults have been recorded from December to February.
