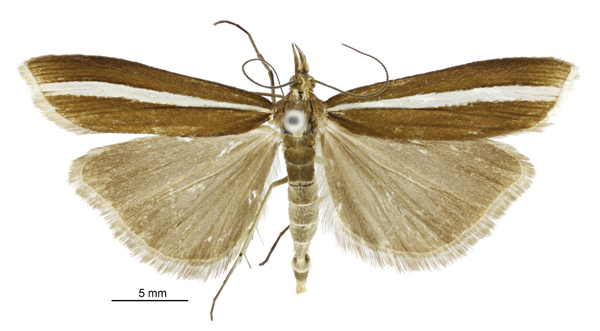
- Male

Scientific classification
- Kingdom: Animalia
- Phylum: Arthropoda
- Clade: Pancrustacea
- Class: Insecta
- Order: Lepidoptera
- Family: Crambidae
- Subfamily: Crambinae
- Tribe: Crambini
- Genus: Orocrambus
- Species: O. geminus

Binomial name
- Orocrambus geminus Patrick, 1991

= Orocrambus geminus =

Species of moth

Orocrambus geminus is a moth in the family Crambidae. It was described by Brian H. Patrick in 1991. It is endemic to New Zealand. The species has been recorded in Central Otago. The habitat consists of wet low alpine areas.
