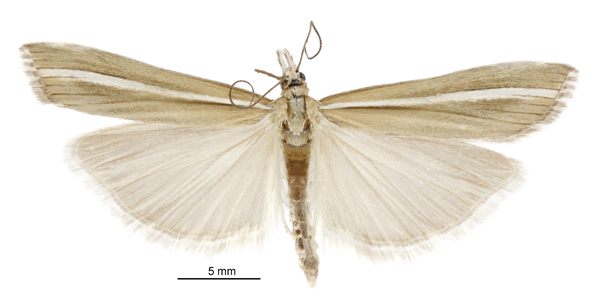
- Male

Scientific classification
- Kingdom: Animalia
- Phylum: Arthropoda
- Clade: Pancrustacea
- Class: Insecta
- Order: Lepidoptera
- Family: Crambidae
- Subfamily: Crambinae
- Tribe: Crambini
- Genus: Orocrambus
- Species: O. paraxenus

Binomial name
- Orocrambus paraxenus (Meyrick, 1885)

Synonyms
- Crambus paraxenus Meyrick, 1885

= Orocrambus paraxenus =

Species of moth

Orocrambus paraxenus is a moth in the family Crambidae. It was described by Edward Meyrick in 1885. It is endemic to New Zealand, where it has been recorded from the South Island. The habitat this species prefers consists of dry tussock areas.

The wingspan is 30–33 mm. Adults have been recorded on wing from December to February.
