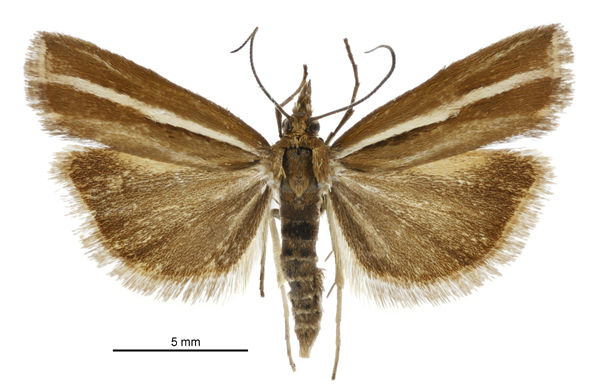
- Male
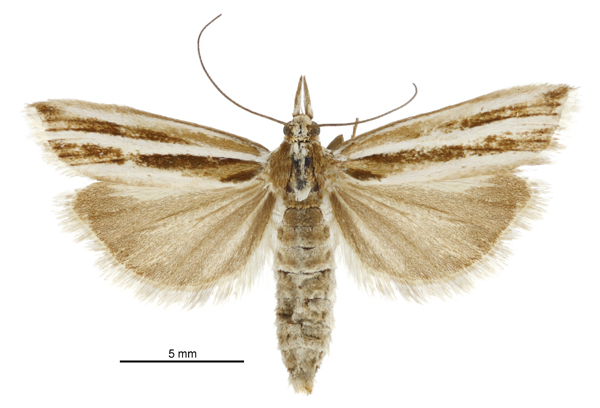
- Female

Scientific classification
- Kingdom: Animalia
- Phylum: Arthropoda
- Clade: Pancrustacea
- Class: Insecta
- Order: Lepidoptera
- Family: Crambidae
- Subfamily: Crambinae
- Tribe: Crambini
- Genus: Orocrambus
- Species: O. melitastes

Binomial name
- Orocrambus melitastes (Meyrick, 1909)

Synonyms
- Crambus melitastes Meyrick, 1909

= Orocrambus melitastes =

Species of moth

Orocrambus melitastes is a moth in the family Crambidae. It was described by Edward Meyrick in 1909. This species is endemic to New Zealand, where it has been recorded in Southland, Otago and Westland. It is found from the subalpine zone down to sea level.

The wingspan is 17–22 mm. Adults are on wing from October to January.

Adults are attracted to light and have been collected via a mercury vapour light trap.
