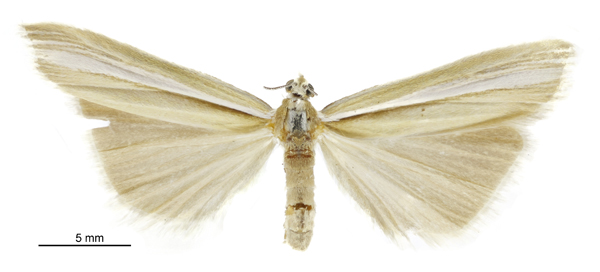
- Male

Scientific classification
- Kingdom: Animalia
- Phylum: Arthropoda
- Clade: Pancrustacea
- Class: Insecta
- Order: Lepidoptera
- Family: Crambidae
- Subfamily: Crambinae
- Tribe: Crambini
- Genus: Orocrambus
- Species: O. lectus

Binomial name
- Orocrambus lectus (Philpott, 1929)

Synonyms
- Crambus lectus Philpott, 1929

= Orocrambus lectus =

Species of insect

Orocrambus lectus is a moth in the family Crambidae. It was described by Alfred Philpott in 1929. It is endemic to New Zealand, where it has been recorded from Fiordland and north-western Nelson. The habitat of this species consists of subalpine and alpine areas. Adults have been recorded from December to February. Adults of this moth are known to pollinate Olearia virgata.
