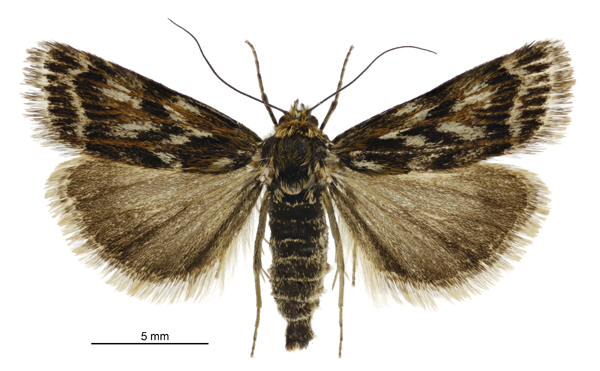
- Female
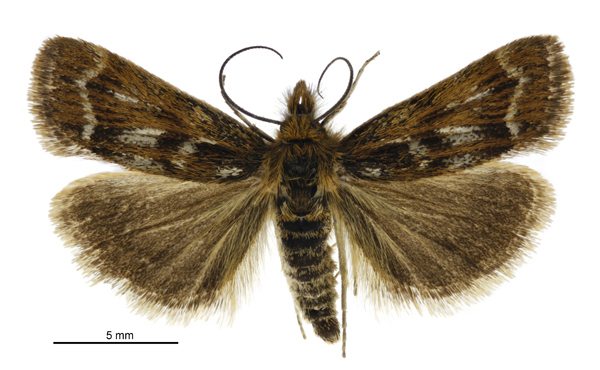
- Male

Scientific classification
- Kingdom: Animalia
- Phylum: Arthropoda
- Clade: Pancrustacea
- Class: Insecta
- Order: Lepidoptera
- Family: Crambidae
- Subfamily: Crambinae
- Tribe: Crambini
- Genus: Orocrambus
- Species: O. scoparioides

Binomial name
- Orocrambus scoparioides Philpott, 1914

= Orocrambus scoparioides =

Species of moth

Orocrambus scoparioides is a moth in the family Crambidae. It was described by Alfred Philpott in 1914. It is endemic to New Zealand, where it has been recorded in the mountain ranges of Otago and Southland.

The wingspan is 13–16 mm for males and 14–20 mm for females. Adults have been recorded on wing from December to April.
