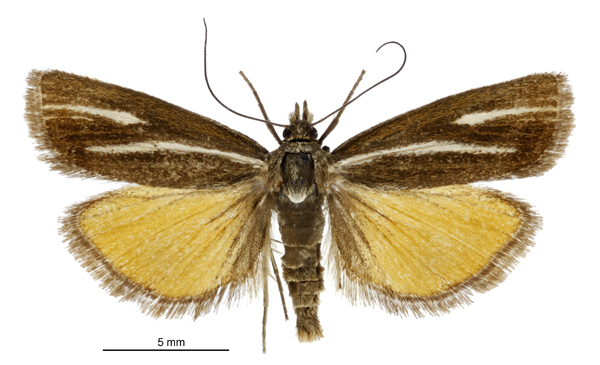
- Male

Scientific classification
- Kingdom: Animalia
- Phylum: Arthropoda
- Clade: Pancrustacea
- Class: Insecta
- Order: Lepidoptera
- Family: Crambidae
- Subfamily: Crambinae
- Tribe: Crambini
- Genus: Orocrambus
- Species: O. heliotes

Binomial name
- Orocrambus heliotes (Meyrick, 1888)

Synonyms
- Crambus heliotes Meyrick, 1888

= Orocrambus heliotes =

Species of moth

Orocrambus heliotes is a moth in the family Crambidae. It was described by Edward Meyrick in 1888. This species is endemic to New Zealand. O. heliotes has been recorded in the South Island and the North Island. The habitat it prefers consists of swampy tussock grasslands and margins of slow-moving streams.

The wingspan is 14–17 mm for males and 15–20 mm for females. Adults have been recorded from early November to early February.

The larvae feed on Sphagnum, Funaria and Breutelia species, as well as Juncus bufonius.
