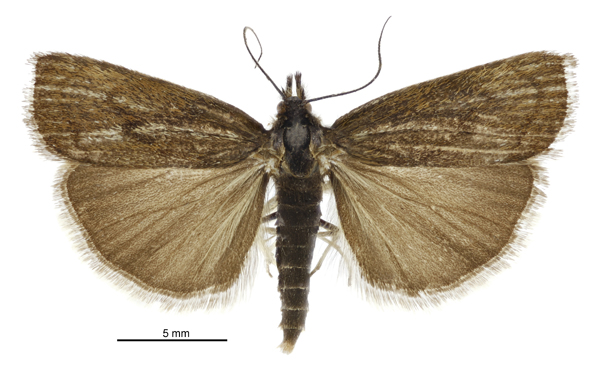
- Female

Scientific classification
- Kingdom: Animalia
- Phylum: Arthropoda
- Clade: Pancrustacea
- Class: Insecta
- Order: Lepidoptera
- Family: Crambidae
- Subfamily: Crambinae
- Tribe: Crambini
- Genus: Orocrambus
- Species: O. ventosus

Binomial name
- Orocrambus ventosus Meyrick, 1920

= Orocrambus ventosus =

Species of moth

Orocrambus ventosus is a moth in the family Crambidae. It was described by Edward Meyrick in 1920. The species is endemic to New Zealand, where it has been recorded in the Tasman Mountains and at Mount Owen. Its preferred habitat is alpine grasslands.

== Description ==
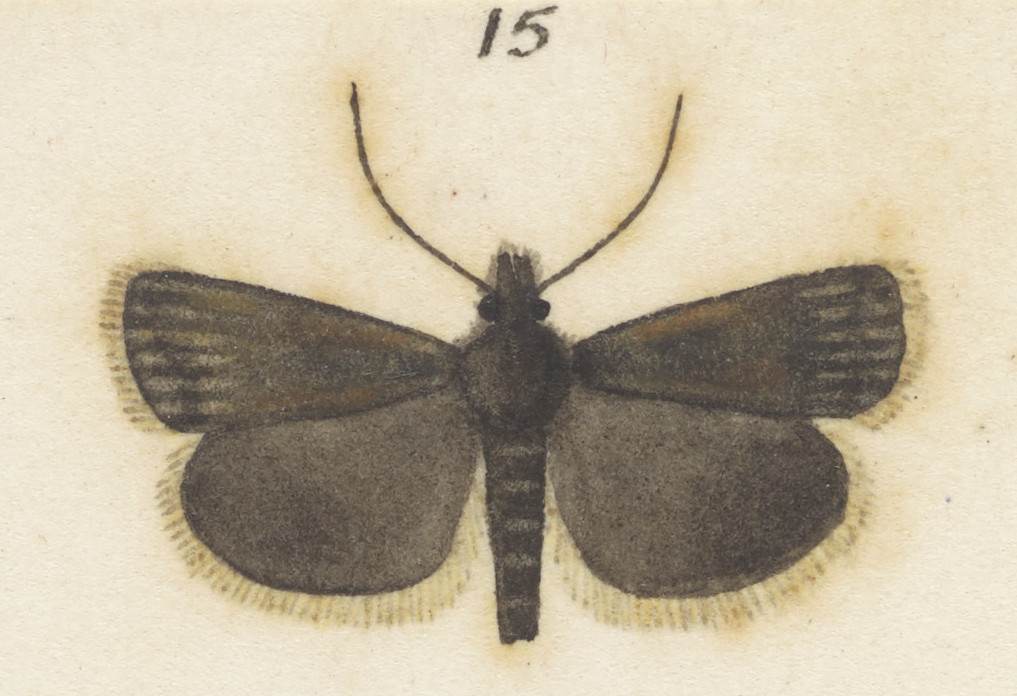
Illustration of O. ventosus by George Hudson.

The wingspan is 25–31 mm. Adults have been recorded on wing from December to February.
