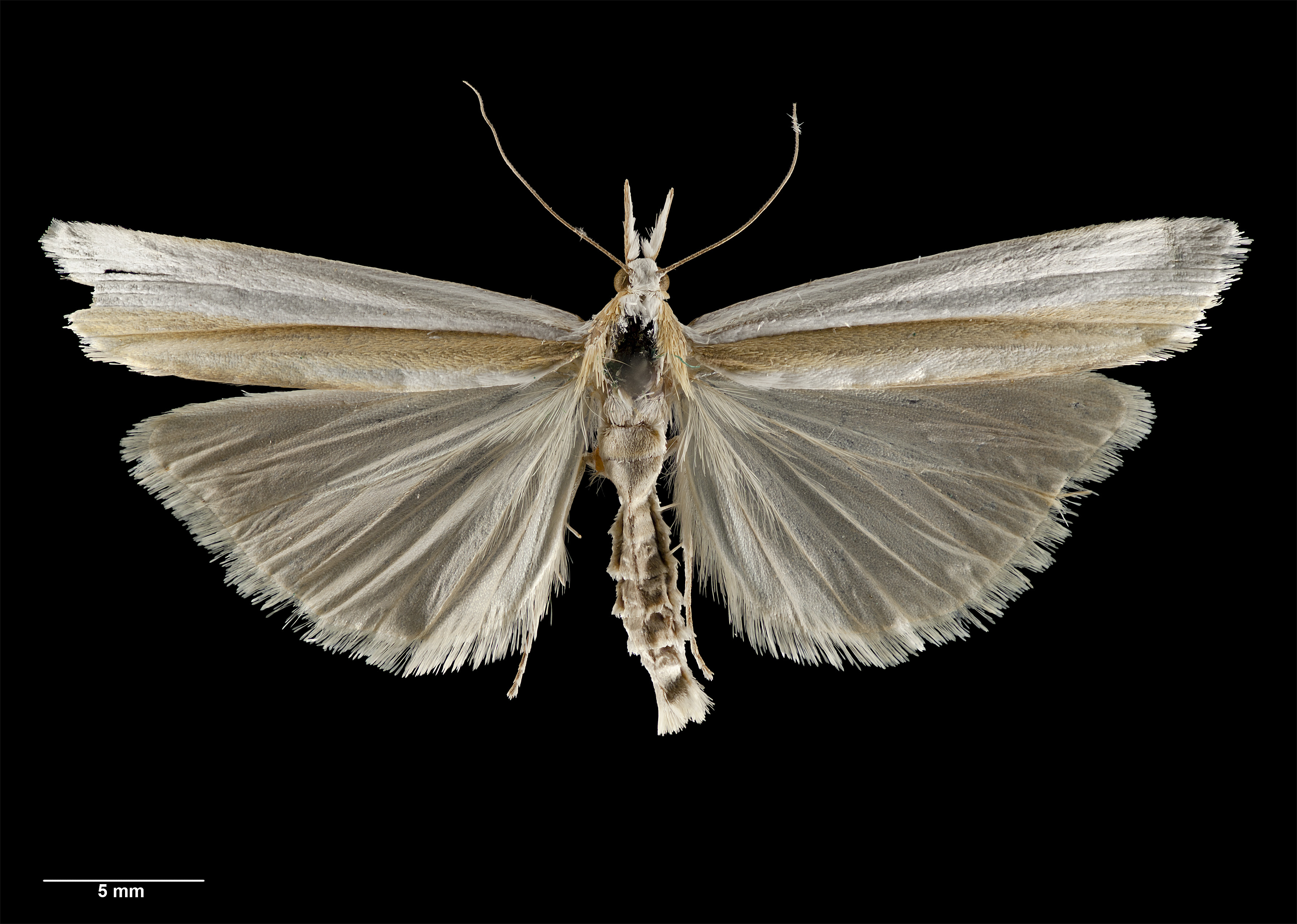
- Holotype specimen

Scientific classification
- Kingdom: Animalia
- Phylum: Arthropoda
- Clade: Pancrustacea
- Class: Insecta
- Order: Lepidoptera
- Family: Crambidae
- Subfamily: Crambinae
- Tribe: Crambini
- Genus: Orocrambus
- Species: O. ephorus

Binomial name
- Orocrambus ephorus (Meyrick, 1885)

Synonyms
- Crambus ephorus Meyrick, 1885; Crambus corylana C. E. Clarke, 1926

= Orocrambus ephorus =

Species of moth

Orocrambus ephorus is a moth in the family Crambidae. It was described by Edward Meyrick in 1885. It is endemic to New Zealand. It has been recorded from the South Island. The species' preferred habitat consists of alpine tussock grasslands.

The wingspan is 31–39 mm. Adults have been recorded on wing from November to February.
