= Orocrambus punctellus =

Conservation status
- Data Deficit (NZ TCS)

Scientific classification
- Kingdom: Animalia
- Phylum: Arthropoda
- Clade: Pancrustacea
- Class: Insecta
- Order: Lepidoptera
- Family: Crambidae
- Subfamily: Crambinae
- Tribe: Crambini
- Genus: Orocrambus
- Species: O. punctellus

Binomial name
- Orocrambus punctellus (Hudson, 1950)

Synonyms
- Crambus punctellus Hudson, 1950

Species of moth endemic to New Zealand

Orocrambus punctellus is a species of moth in the family Crambidae. It is endemic to New Zealand. In 2025 this species was classified as "data deficient" under the New Zealand Threat Classification System.

== Taxonomy ==
It was described by George Vernon Hudson in 1950 using a specimen collected by George Howes at Portobello in Dunedin and named Crambus punctellus. In 1975 D. E. Gaskin transferred this species to the genus Orocrambus. As at 2025 this species is regarded as taxonomically unresolved. The holotype specimen is held at the Museum of New Zealand Te Papa Tongarewa.

== Description ==
Hudson described the species as follows:

The expansion of the wings is 7/8 inch (23 mm.). The fore-wings are rather elongate, with the costa slightly arched, and the termen moderately oblique; pale creamy-white; basal third on dorsum very faintly suffused with brownish-ochreous; a broad, ill-defined, brownish-edged transverse band beyond this, followed by a large, conspicuous, dark brown discal spot; a finely dentate subterminal line, strongest towards dorum, and a much fainter line beyond this; outer third of costa and tornal area very faintly suffused with pale brown; an obscure brown mark on costa at about 3/4. Head white. Palpi long, stout, whitish, densely speckled with brown towards apex. Thorax and abdomen brownish-ochreous. Hindwings whitish-ochreous. Cilia almost white.

== Distribution ==
This species is endemic to New Zealand. It has only been recorded from the type locality at Otago Peninsula.

== Biology and behaviour ==
Very little is known of the biology of this species. The host species for the larvae of this moth is unknown. Adults have been recorded on wing in March.

== Conservation status ==
In 2025 this species was classified by the New Zealand Department of Conservation as "data deficient" under the New Zealand Threat Classification System.
