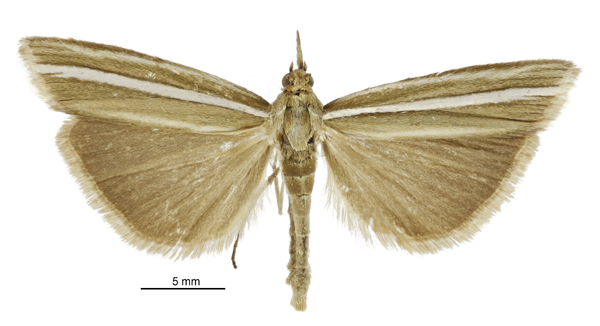
- Male

Scientific classification
- Kingdom: Animalia
- Phylum: Arthropoda
- Clade: Pancrustacea
- Class: Insecta
- Order: Lepidoptera
- Family: Crambidae
- Subfamily: Crambinae
- Tribe: Crambini
- Genus: Orocrambus
- Species: O. scutatus

Binomial name
- Orocrambus scutatus (Philpott, 1917)

Synonyms
- Crambus scutatus Philpott, 1917

= Orocrambus scutatus =

Species of moth

Orocrambus scutatus is a moth in the family Crambidae. It was described by Alfred Philpott in 1917. It is endemic to New Zealand, where it has been recorded in Southland. The habitat of this species consists of subalpine tussock grassland.

The wingspan is 26–30 mm. Adults have been recorded on wing from December to January.
