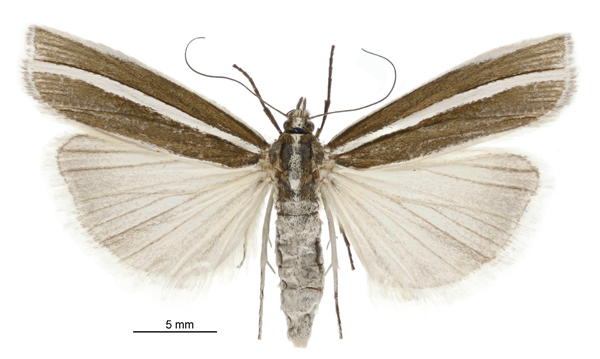
- Female
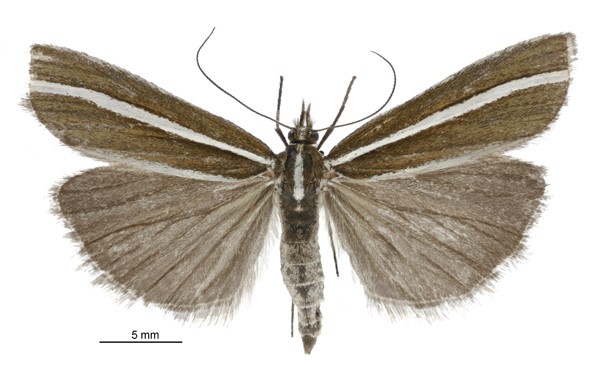
- Male

Scientific classification
- Kingdom: Animalia
- Phylum: Arthropoda
- Clade: Pancrustacea
- Class: Insecta
- Order: Lepidoptera
- Family: Crambidae
- Subfamily: Crambinae
- Tribe: Crambini
- Genus: Orocrambus
- Species: O. oppositus

Binomial name
- Orocrambus oppositus (Philpott, 1915)

Synonyms
- Crambus oppositus Philpott, 1915

= Orocrambus oppositus =

Species of moth

Orocrambus oppositus is a moth in the family Crambidae. It was described by Alfred Philpott in 1915. It is endemic to New Zealand, where it has been recorded in Fiordland. It is found in alpine grasslands.

The wingspan is 29–31 mm. Adults are on wing from December to February.
