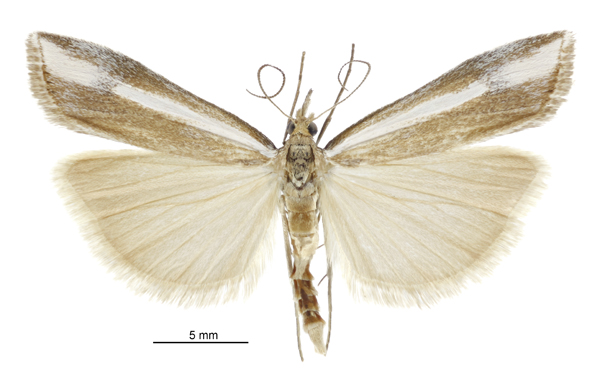
- Male
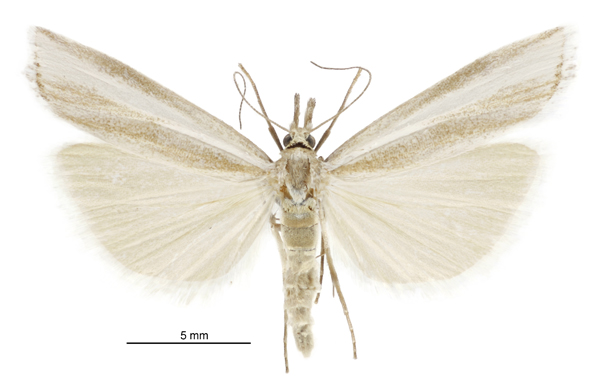
- Female

Scientific classification
- Kingdom: Animalia
- Phylum: Arthropoda
- Clade: Pancrustacea
- Class: Insecta
- Order: Lepidoptera
- Family: Crambidae
- Subfamily: Crambinae
- Tribe: Crambini
- Genus: Orocrambus
- Species: O. vulgaris

Binomial name
- Orocrambus vulgaris (Butler, 1877)

Synonyms
- Crambus vulgaris Butler, 1877; Crambus tuhualis Meyrick, 1883; Crambus obstructus Meyrick, 1911; Crambus obsctructus Bleszynski & Collins, 1962

= Orocrambus vulgaris =

Species of moth

Orocrambus vulgaris is a moth in the family Crambidae. It was described by Arthur Gardiner Butler in 1877. It is endemic to New Zealand, where it has been recorded from the North Island and South Island. The species prefers habitat that consists of lowland and subalpine grasslands.

The wingspan is 21–25 mm. Adults have been recorded on wing from January to April.
