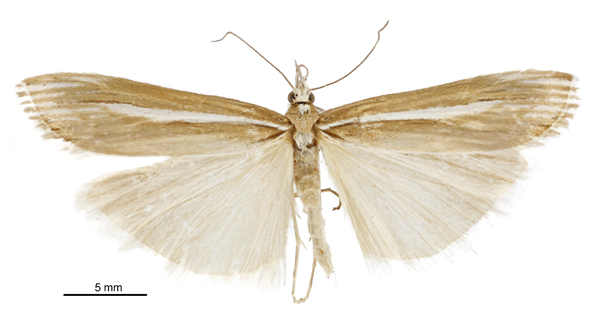
- Male

Scientific classification
- Kingdom: Animalia
- Phylum: Arthropoda
- Clade: Pancrustacea
- Class: Insecta
- Order: Lepidoptera
- Family: Crambidae
- Subfamily: Crambinae
- Tribe: Crambini
- Genus: Orocrambus
- Species: O. heteraulus

Binomial name
- Orocrambus heteraulus (Meyrick, 1905)

Synonyms
- Crambus heteraulus Meyrick, 1905

= Orocrambus heteraulus =

Species of moth

Orocrambus heteraulus is a moth in the family Crambidae. It was described by Edward Meyrick in 1905. It is endemic to New Zealand. This species has been recorded to inhabit the Humboldt Range and the Routeburn Valley.

The wingspan is 28–35 mm. Adults have been recorded from in December and February.
