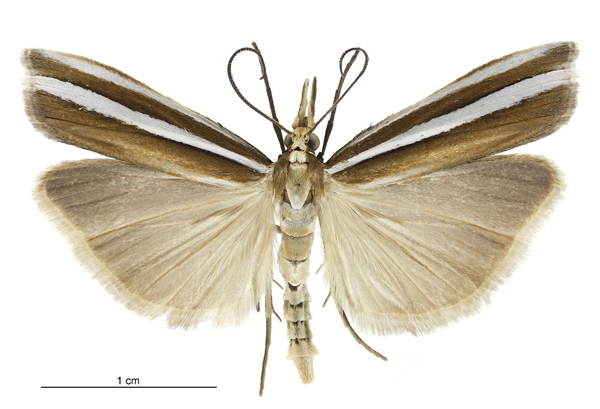
- Female
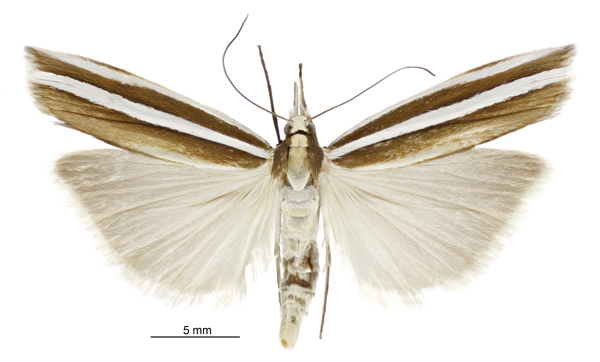
- Male

Scientific classification
- Kingdom: Animalia
- Phylum: Arthropoda
- Clade: Pancrustacea
- Class: Insecta
- Order: Lepidoptera
- Family: Crambidae
- Subfamily: Crambinae
- Tribe: Crambini
- Genus: Orocrambus
- Species: O. siriellus

Binomial name
- Orocrambus siriellus (Meyrick, 1883)

Synonyms
- Crambus siriellus Meyrick, 1883

= Orocrambus siriellus =

Species of moth

Orocrambus siriellus is a moth in the family Crambidae. It was described by Edward Meyrick in 1883. This species is endemic to New Zealand, where it has been recorded in Northland to Southland and on the Chatham Islands. It lives in habitat consisting of swampy areas.

The wingspan is 29–34 mm. Adults have been recorded on wing from December to February. The larval host plant of this species is currently unknown. It has been hypothesised that it is likely to be Schoenus brevifolius.
