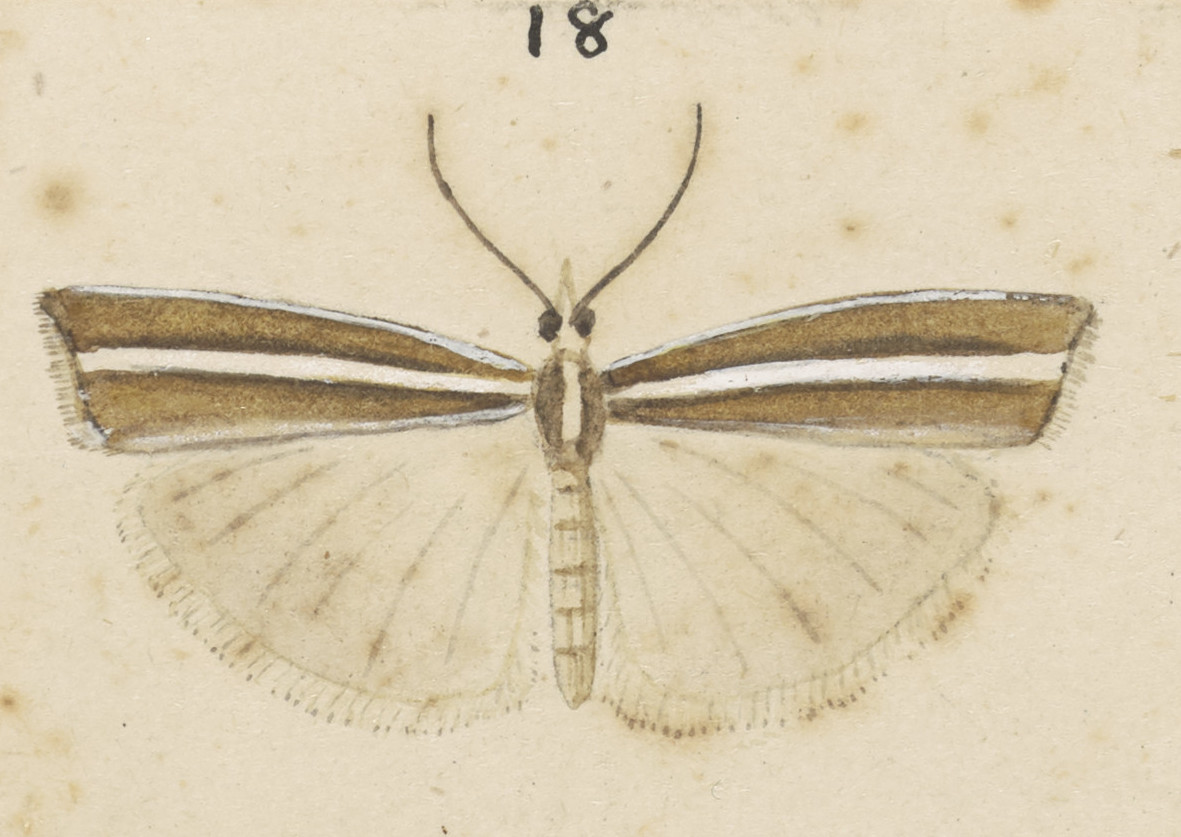
- Illustration of female

Scientific classification
- Kingdom: Animalia
- Phylum: Arthropoda
- Clade: Pancrustacea
- Class: Insecta
- Order: Lepidoptera
- Family: Crambidae
- Subfamily: Crambinae
- Tribe: Crambini
- Genus: Orocrambus
- Species: O. dicrenellus

Binomial name
- Orocrambus dicrenellus (Meyrick, 1882)

Synonyms
- Crambus dicrenellus Meyrick, 1882

= Orocrambus dicrenellus =

Species of moth

Orocrambus dicrenellus is a moth in the family Crambidae. This species was first described by Edward Meyrick in 1882 under the name Crambus dicrenellus. It is endemic to New Zealand. It has been recorded from the central part of the South Island.

== Taxonomy ==
O. dicrenellus was first described by Edward Meyrick in June 1882 and named Crambus dicrenellus. Meyrick gave a fuller description of this species in May 1883. The male lectotype specimen, collected at Mount Hutt by R. E. Fereday, is held at the Natural History Museum, London.

== Description ==
The wingspan is 29–33 mm. Adults have been recorded on wing from November to February.
