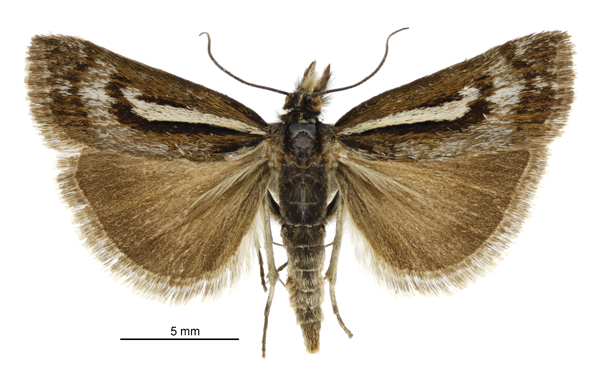
- Male

Scientific classification
- Kingdom: Animalia
- Phylum: Arthropoda
- Clade: Pancrustacea
- Class: Insecta
- Order: Lepidoptera
- Family: Crambidae
- Subfamily: Crambinae
- Tribe: Crambini
- Genus: Orocrambus
- Species: O. machaeristes

Binomial name
- Orocrambus machaeristes Meyrick, 1905

= Orocrambus machaeristes =

Species of moth endemic to New Zealand

Orocrambus machaeristes is a moth in the family Crambidae. It was first described by Edward Meyrick. It is endemic to New Zealand, where it has been recorded from north-western Nelson, south along the Southern Alps to Lake Wakatipu. This species prefers alpine habitat and inhabits areas populated with snowgrass and tussock species. The range of this moth coincides with the range of the tussock species Chionochloa pallens. Adults are day flying and have been observed on the wing from December until February.

== Taxonomy ==
O. machaeristes was described by Edward Meyrick in 1905 using two specimens collected at Mount Earnslaw at 5300 ft. George Hudson discussed and illustrated this species in his 1928 publication The butterflies and moths of New Zealand. D. E. Gaskin revised this species in 1975. The lectotype specimen, collected by George Hudson at Mount Earnslaw, is held at the Natural History Museum, London.

== Description ==
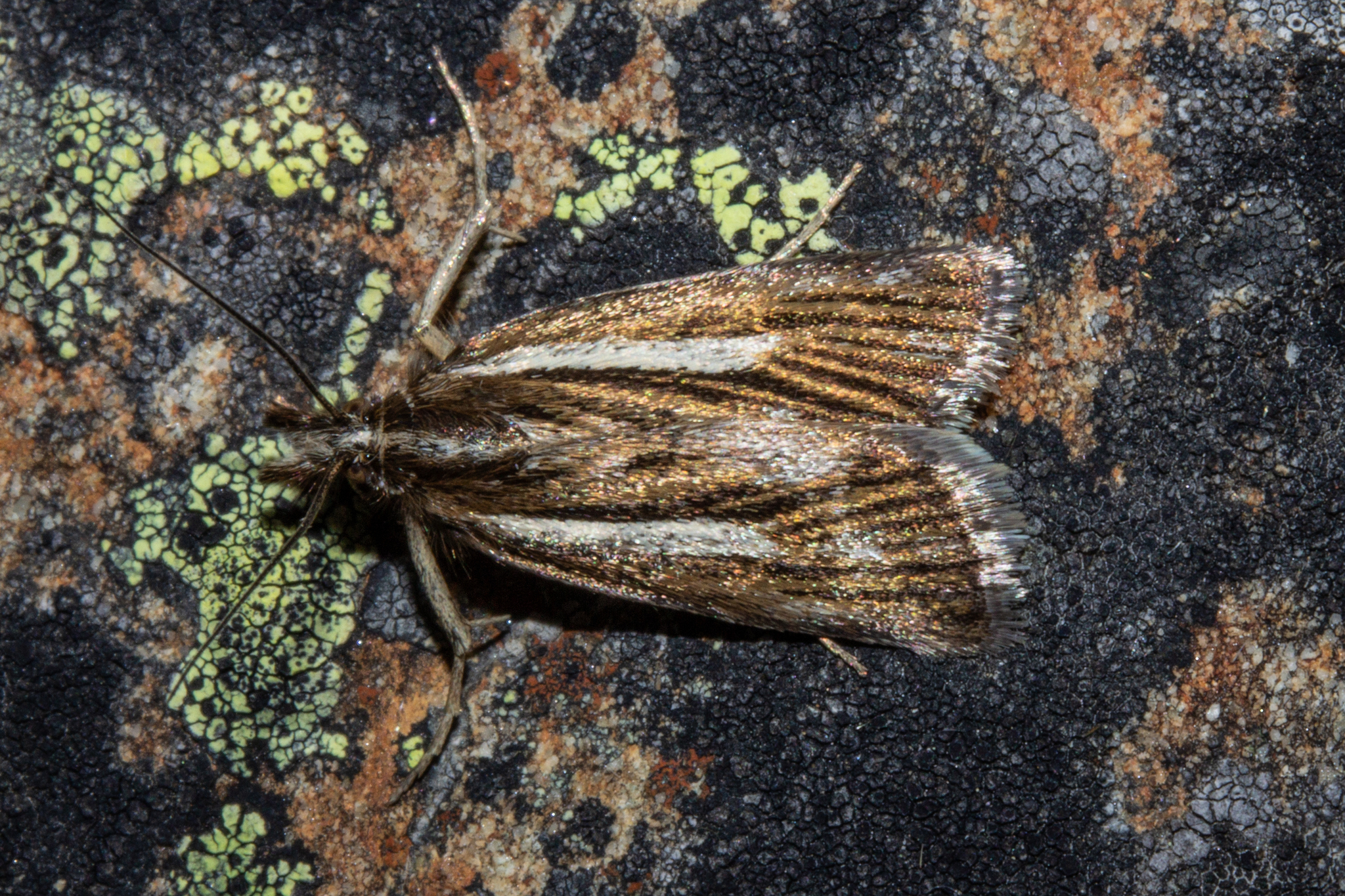
Living O. machaeristes

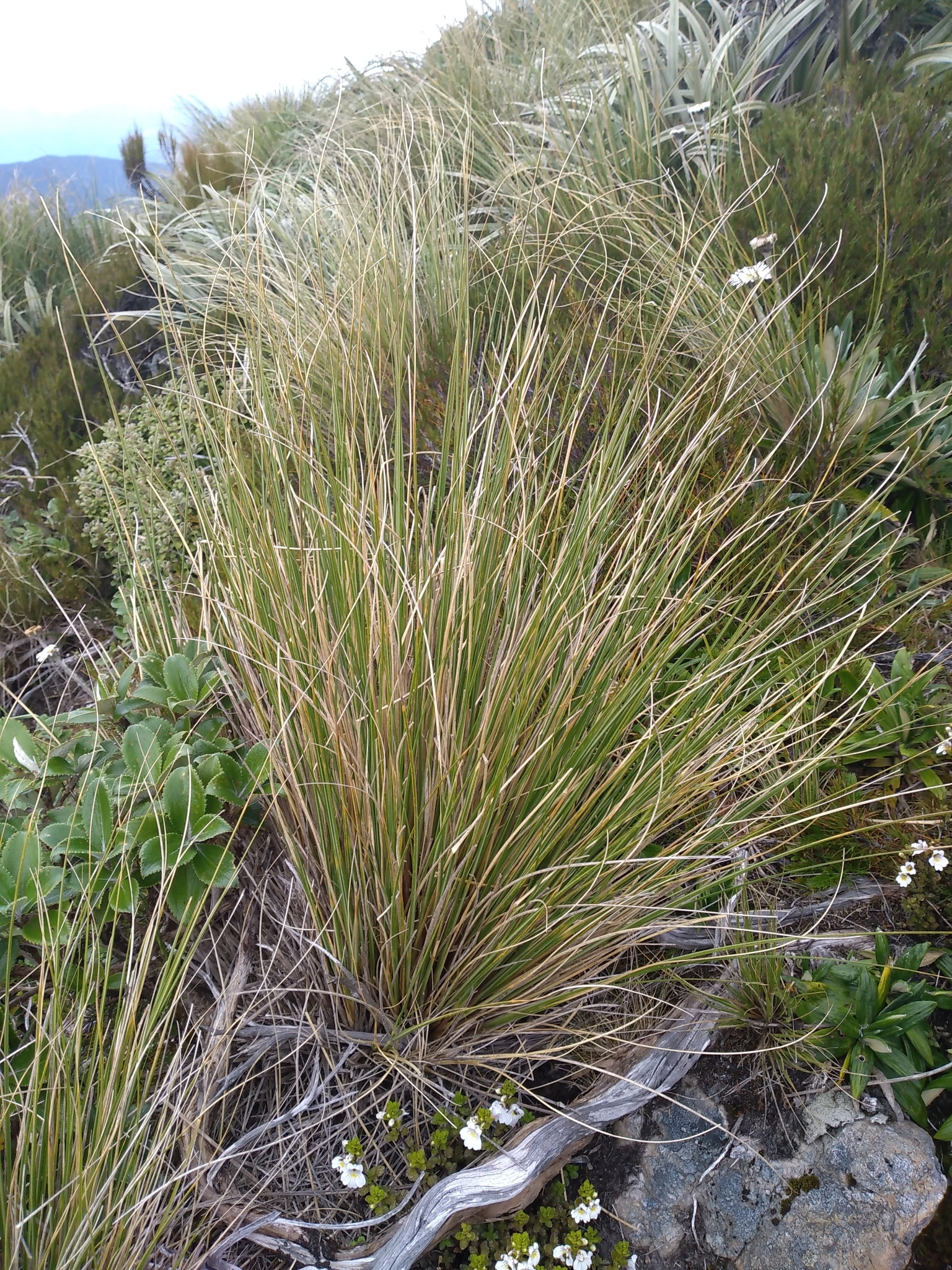
Chionochloa pallens

Meyrick described the adults of this species as follows:

♂♀. 21-24 mm. Head and thorax dark brown mixed with blackish, centre of crown and of thorax anteriorly and in ♀ face whitish. Palpi blackish-fuscous, whitish internally. Antennae dark fuscous. Abdomen dark fuscous, somewhat whitish-sprinkled. Forewings elongate, moderately dilated, costa hardly arched, apex obtuse, termen rather oblique, straight, rounded beneath; brown, more or less mixed with dark grey and grey-whitish (more strongly in ♀); an ochreous-white median longitudinal streak from base to 3/5, dilated and obliquely truncate posteriorly, edged beneath by a thick blackish streak which curves up round posterior extremity, where it is interrupted by interneural lines of ground colour, and continued as a series of diminishing spots to near costa; a black subdorsal streak from base to 1/3; a curved series of blackish marks on veins from 4/5 of costa to tornus: cilia grey, with darker basal shade, tips ochreous-whitish. Hind-wings dark grey, becoming blackish-grey towards termen; cilia as in fore-wings.

The wingspan of the adult moth ranges between 19 and 25 mm. Hudson pointed out that this species is varies considerably in the extent of the whitish speckling on the fore-wings near the termen, but is easily recognised by the narrow wedge-shaped white central marking.

== Distribution ==
O. machaeristes is endemic to New Zealand. It has been recorded from north-west Nelson south along the Southern Alps to Lake Wakatipu.

== Habitat and hosts ==
This species prefers alpine habitat. It inhabits snowgrass and tussock on high mountainsides. Its range coincides with the range of the tussock species Chionochloa pallens.

== Behaviour ==
Adult moths are most commonly on the wing from December until February. It is a day flying moth and is particularly active in hot sunshine.
