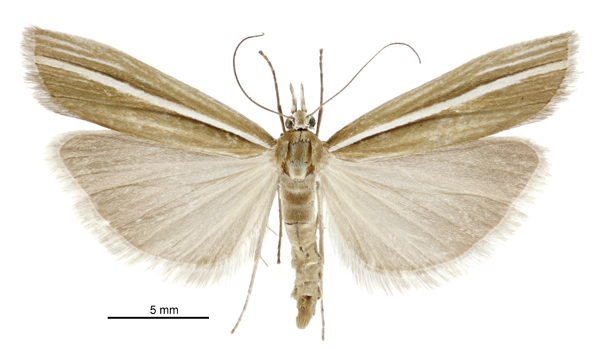
- Female

Scientific classification
- Kingdom: Animalia
- Phylum: Arthropoda
- Clade: Pancrustacea
- Class: Insecta
- Order: Lepidoptera
- Family: Crambidae
- Subfamily: Crambinae
- Tribe: Crambini
- Genus: Orocrambus
- Species: O. haplotomus

Binomial name
- Orocrambus haplotomus (Meyrick, 1882)

Synonyms
- Crambus haplotomus Meyrick, 1882

= Orocrambus haplotomus =

Species of moth

Orocrambus haplotomus is a moth in the family Crambidae. It was described by Edward Meyrick in 1882. This species is endemic to New Zealand. O. haplotomus has been recorded from the areas around Lake Te Anau and Lake Wakatipu in the South Island.

== Taxonomy ==
O. haplotomus was first described by Edward Meyrick in June 1882 and named Crambus haplotomus. Meyrick gave a fuller description of this species in May 1883. The male lectotype specimen, collected at Lake Wakatipu by R. E. Fereday, is held at the Natural History Museum, London.

== Description ==
The wingspan is 19–28 mm for males and 25–30 mm for females.
