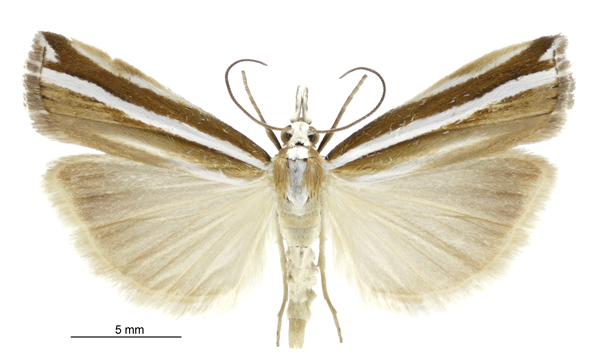
- Male

Scientific classification
- Kingdom: Animalia
- Phylum: Arthropoda
- Clade: Pancrustacea
- Class: Insecta
- Order: Lepidoptera
- Family: Crambidae
- Subfamily: Crambinae
- Tribe: Crambini
- Genus: Orocrambus
- Species: O. apicellus

Binomial name
- Orocrambus apicellus (Zeller, 1863)

Synonyms
- Crambus apicellus Zeller, 1863

= Orocrambus apicellus =

Species of moth

Orocrambus apicellus is a moth in the family Crambidae. It was described by Philipp Christoph Zeller in 1863. It is endemic to New Zealand. O. apicellus has been recorded from the North and South Islands, as well as Stewart Island, Chatham Islands and the Auckland Islands. The habitat consists of swampy areas and wet pastures.

The wingspan is 22–26 mm. Adults have been recorded on wing from October to April in two generations per year.

The larvae feed on Juncus polyanthemos, Juncus bufonius and possibly Carex species.
