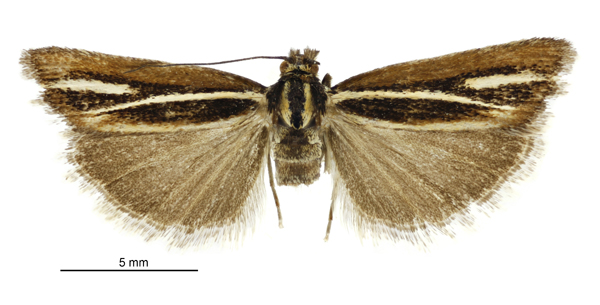
- Female

Scientific classification
- Kingdom: Animalia
- Phylum: Arthropoda
- Clade: Pancrustacea
- Class: Insecta
- Order: Lepidoptera
- Family: Crambidae
- Subfamily: Crambinae
- Tribe: Crambini
- Genus: Orocrambus
- Species: O. thymiastes

Binomial name
- Orocrambus thymiastes Meyrick, 1901

= Orocrambus thymiastes =

Species of moth

Orocrambus thymiastes is a moth in the family Crambidae. It was described by Edward Meyrick in 1901. This species is endemic to New Zealand, where it has been recorded from Southland. O. thymiastes prefers habitat that consists of boggy areas. This species is associated with Chionochloa rubra.

The wingspan is 18–23 mm.
