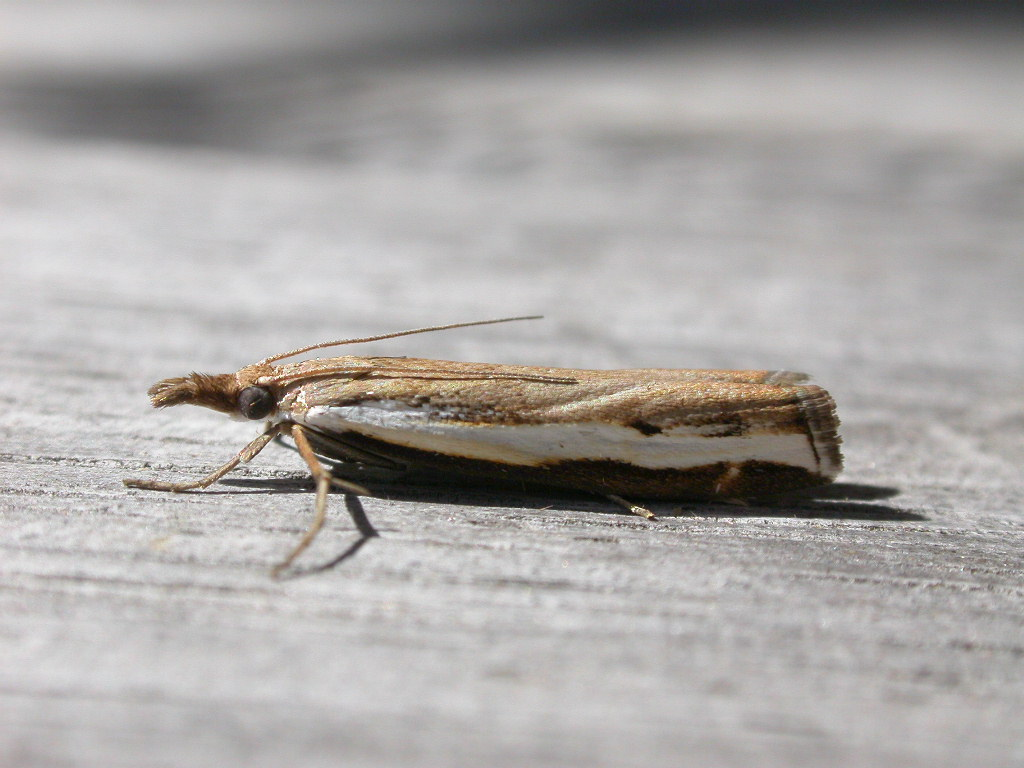

Scientific classification
- Kingdom: Animalia
- Phylum: Arthropoda
- Clade: Pancrustacea
- Class: Insecta
- Order: Lepidoptera
- Family: Crambidae
- Subfamily: Crambinae
- Tribe: Crambini
- Genus: Orocrambus; Purdie, 1884

Synonyms
- Orocrambus Meyrick, 1885

= Orocrambus =

Genus of moths

Orocrambus is a genus of moths of the family Crambidae. All species are endemic to New Zealand. It was first described by Alex Purdie in 1884.

== Species ==
- Orocrambus abditus Philpott, 1924
- Orocrambus aethonellus Meyrick, 1883
- Orocrambus angustipennis Zeller, 1877
- Orocrambus apicellus Zeller, 1863
- Orocrambus callirrhous Meyrick, 1883
- Orocrambus catacaustus Meyrick, 1885
- Orocrambus clarkei Philpott, 1930
  - Orocrambus clarkei clarkei Philpott, 1930
  - Orocrambus clarkei eximia Salmon, 1946
- Orocrambus corruptus Butler, 1877
- Orocrambus crenaeus Meyrick, 1885
- Orocrambus cultus Philpott, 1917
- Orocrambus cyclopicus Meyrick, 1883
- Orocrambus dicrenellus Meyrick, 1883
- Orocrambus enchophorus Meyrick, 1885
- Orocrambus ephorus Meyrick, 1885
- Orocrambus flexuosellus Doubleday in White & Doubleday, 1843
- Orocrambus fugitivellus Hudson, 1950
- Orocrambus geminus Patrick, 1991
- Orocrambus haplotomus Meyrick, 1883
- Orocrambus harpophorus Meyrick, 1883
- Orocrambus heliotes Meyrick, 1888
- Orocrambus heteraulus Meyrick, 1905
- Orocrambus horistes Meyrick, 1902
- Orocrambus isochytus Meyrick, 1888
- Orocrambus jansoni Gaskin, 1975
- Orocrambus lectus Philpott, 1929
- Orocrambus lewisi Gaskin, 1975
- Orocrambus lindsayi Gaskin, 1975
- Orocrambus machaeristes Meyrick, 1905
- Orocrambus melampetrus Purdie, 1884
- Orocrambus melitastes Meyrick, 1909
- Orocrambus mylites Meyrick, 1888
- Orocrambus oppositus Philpott, 1915
- Orocrambus ordishi Gaskin, 1975
- Orocrambus ornatus Philpott, 1927
- Orocrambus paraxenus Meyrick, 1885
- Orocrambus philpotti Gaskin, 1975
- Orocrambus punctellus Hudson, 1950
- Orocrambus ramosellus Doubleday in White & Doubleday, 1843
- Orocrambus scoparioides Philpott, 1914
- Orocrambus scutatus Philpott, 1917
- Orocrambus simplex Butler, 1877
- Orocrambus siriellus Meyrick, 1883
- Orocrambus sophistes Meyrick, 1905
- Orocrambus sophronellus Meyrick, 1885
- Orocrambus thymiastes Meyrick, 1901
- Orocrambus tritonellus Meyrick, 1885
- Orocrambus tuhualis C. Felder, R. Felder & Rogenhofer, 1875
- Orocrambus ventosus Meyrick, 1920
- Orocrambus vittellus Doubleday in White & Doubleday, 1843
- Orocrambus vulgaris Butler, 1877
- Orocrambus xanthogrammus Meyrick, 1883
