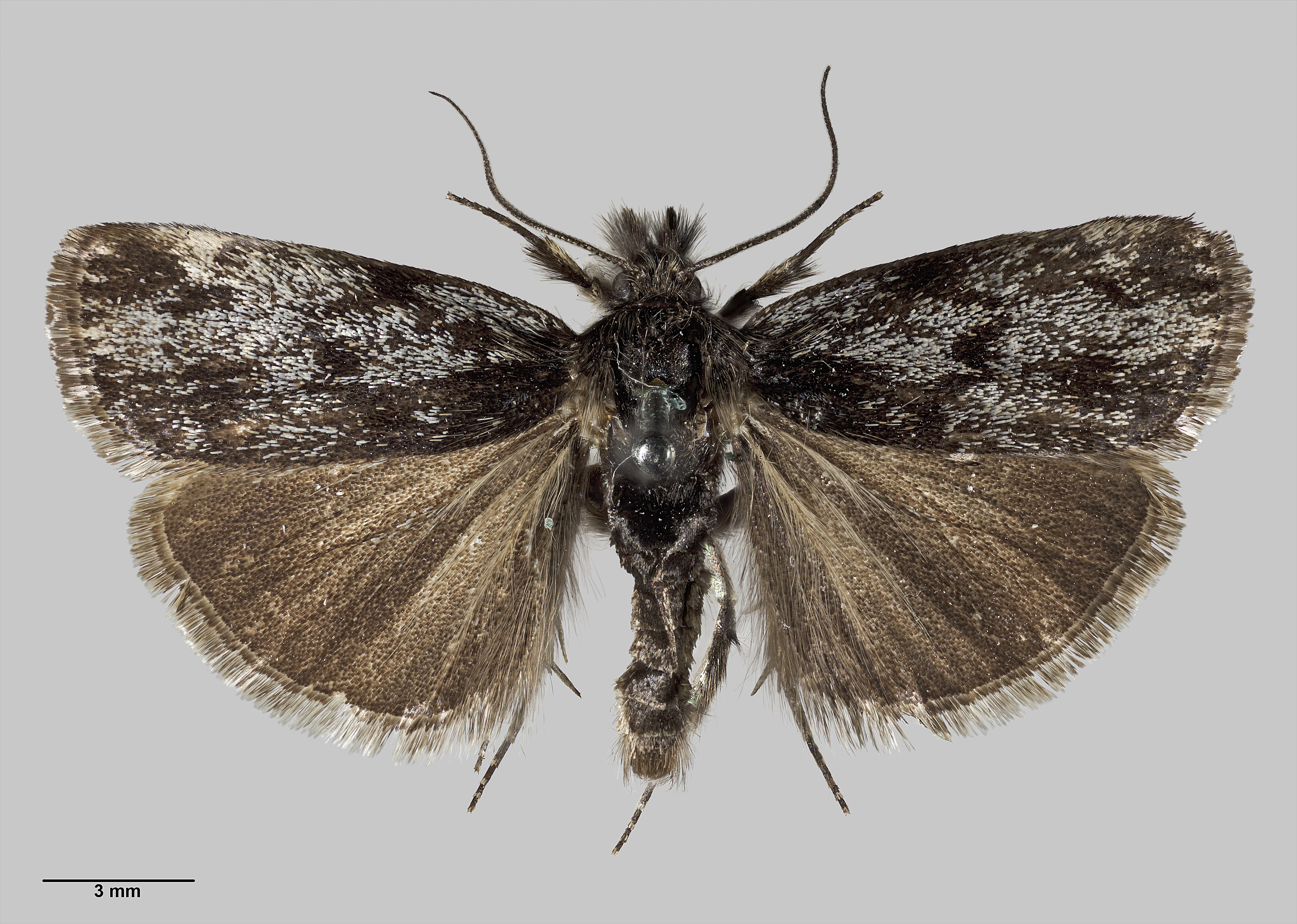
- Orocrambus clarkei clarkei

Scientific classification
- Kingdom: Animalia
- Phylum: Arthropoda
- Clade: Pancrustacea
- Class: Insecta
- Order: Lepidoptera
- Family: Crambidae
- Subfamily: Crambinae
- Tribe: Crambini
- Genus: Orocrambus
- Species: O. clarkei

Binomial name
- Orocrambus clarkei Philpott, 1930

Synonyms
- Tauroscopa eximia Salmon, 1946; Tauroscopa nebulosa Philpott, 1930

= Orocrambus clarkei =

Species of moth

Orocrambus clarkei is a moth in the family Crambidae. It was described by Alfred Philpott in 1930. This species is endemic to New Zealand. It is known from Mount Moltke, Minaret Peak, Homer Saddle and the Humboldt Range.

The wingspan is 20–26 mm. Adults have been recorded on wing from December to January.

== Subspecies ==
- Orocrambus clarkei clarkei (Mount Moltke, Minaret Peak)
- Orocrambus clarkei eximia (Salmon, 1946) (Homer Saddle, Humboldt Range)
