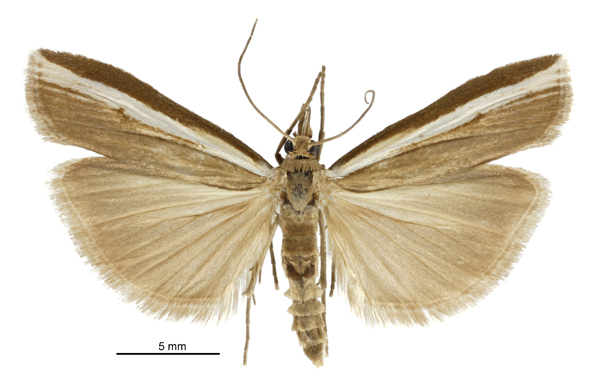
- Male

Scientific classification
- Kingdom: Animalia
- Phylum: Arthropoda
- Clade: Pancrustacea
- Class: Insecta
- Order: Lepidoptera
- Family: Crambidae
- Subfamily: Crambinae
- Tribe: Crambini
- Genus: Orocrambus
- Species: O. horistes

Binomial name
- Orocrambus horistes (Meyrick, 1902)

Synonyms
- Crambus horistes Meyrick, 1902

= Orocrambus horistes =

Species of moth

Orocrambus horistes is a moth in the family Crambidae. It was described by Edward Meyrick in 1902. O. horistes is endemic to New Zealand, where it has only been recorded from the Chatham Islands.

The wingspan is 25–29 mm. Adults have been recorded from December to January.
