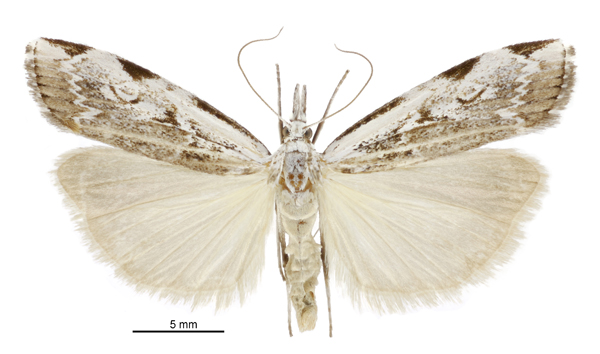
- Female

Scientific classification
- Kingdom: Animalia
- Phylum: Arthropoda
- Clade: Pancrustacea
- Class: Insecta
- Order: Lepidoptera
- Family: Crambidae
- Subfamily: Crambinae
- Tribe: Crambini
- Genus: Orocrambus
- Species: O. tuhualis

Binomial name
- Orocrambus tuhualis (C. Felder & Rogenhofer, 1875)

Synonyms
- Crambus tuhualis Felder and Rogenhofer, 1875; Crambus thrincodes Meyrick, 1910; Crambus thrincodes Meyrick, 1911

= Orocrambus tuhualis =

Species of moth endemic to New Zealand

Orocrambus tuhualis is a moth in the family Crambidae. It was first described by Cajetan Felder and Alois Friedrich Rogenhofer in 1875. It is endemic to New Zealand, where it has been recorded in the South Island and around Wellington in the North Island. This species inhabits swampy areas and is associated with patches of the fern Pteridium aquilinum. It also frequents clearings in beech forest. Adults have been recorded on the wing in November and December. It has been hypothesised that the larval host plant for this moth are species in the genus Juncus.

== Taxonomy ==
This species was first described by Cajetan Felder and Alois Friedrich Rogenhofer in 1875 and originally named Crambus tuhualis. In 1910 Edward Meyrick, thinking he was describing a new species, named this moth Crambus thrincodes. In 1911 Meyrick mistakenly described Crambus thrincodes again as a new species. This name was synonymised with Crambus tuhualis by Alfred Philpott in 1926. George Hudson discussed and illustrated this species under the name Crambus tuhualis in his 1928 book The butterflies and moths of New Zealand. In 1962 Stanislaw Bleszynski and Reginald J. Collins confirmed this synonymisation. In 1975 David Gaskin revised the genus Orocrambus and placed this species within it. The female holotype specimen, collected in Nelson by T. R. Oxley, is held at the Natural History Museum, London.

== Description ==
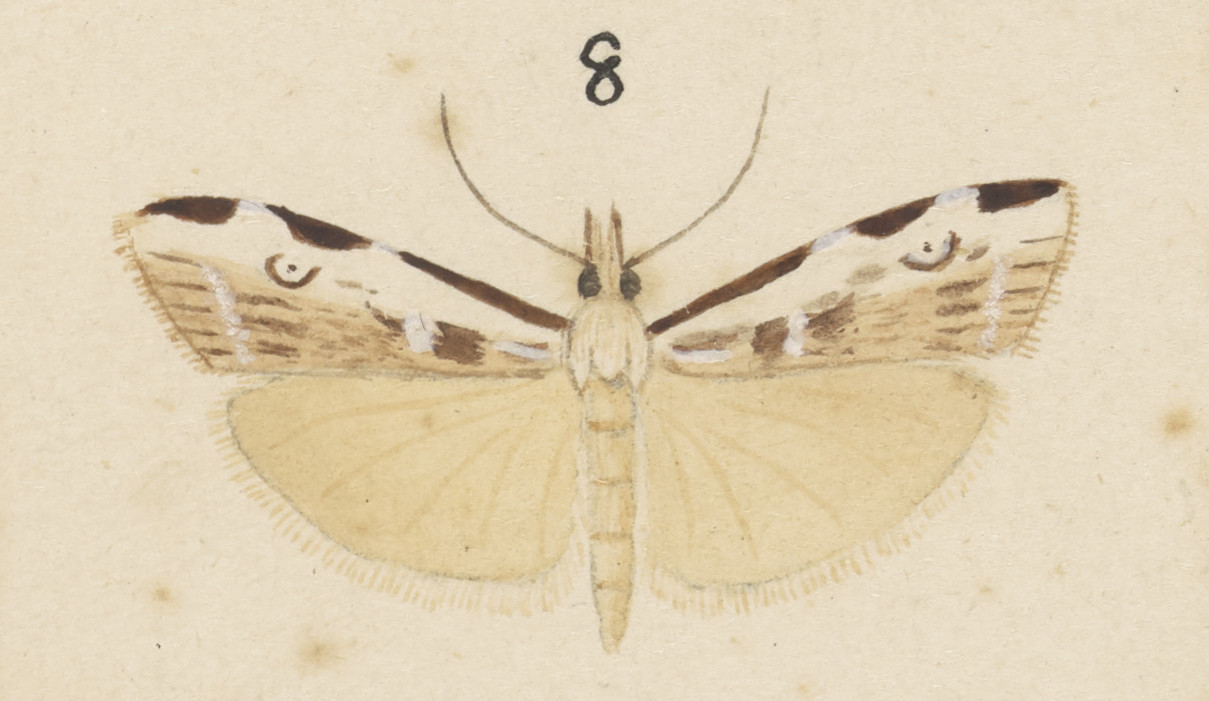
Illustration of male by Hudson.

The wingspan of the adults of this species is 23–28 mm.

Hudson described this moth as follows:

The expansion of the wings is slightly over 1 inch. The fore-wings have a very broad, irregular, white costal band, the dorsal area being pale brownish-ochreous; there is a narrow, chocolate-brown streak on the costal edge becoming broader towards the apex and interrupted by white bars at 1/3 and 3/4; several irregular dark brown marks at about 1/3; a sharp, crescent- shaped brown mark in the disc at 2/3 enclosing a white spot with a faint brown centre; the second line is white and very jagged; the veins:are more or less marked in dark brown. The hind- wings are pale ochreous, slightly darker towards the apex.

Hudson pointed out that this species is variable in the extent of the white costal area and the breadth of the white bars that break up the costal brown edging of the forewings. This can can result in the brown edging appearing as three elongated spots.

== Distribution ==
This species is endemic to New Zealand. It has been observed around Wellington in the North Island and throughout the South Island.

== Habitat and hosts ==
This species inhabitat swampy areas. It is associated with patches of the fern Pteridium aquilinum and also frequents clearings in beech forest. It has been hypothesised that the larval host plant for this moth is a species in the genus Juncus.

== Behaviour ==
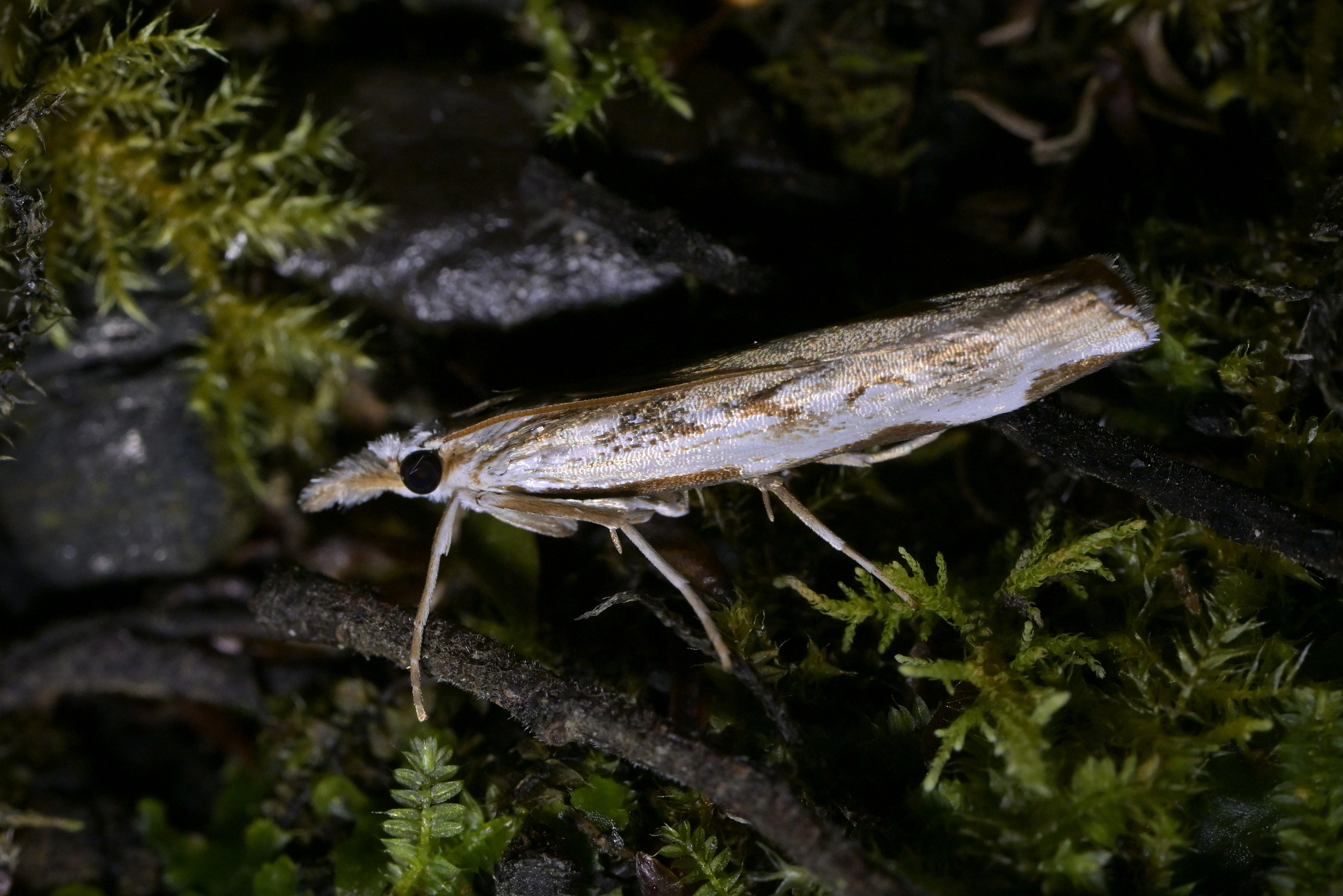
O. tuhualis showing resting posture.

Adults have been recorded on the wing from November to December. Hudson points out that adults at rest the hold their abdomens and wings upwards at an angle of about 15 degrees from the object on which the insect is standing.
