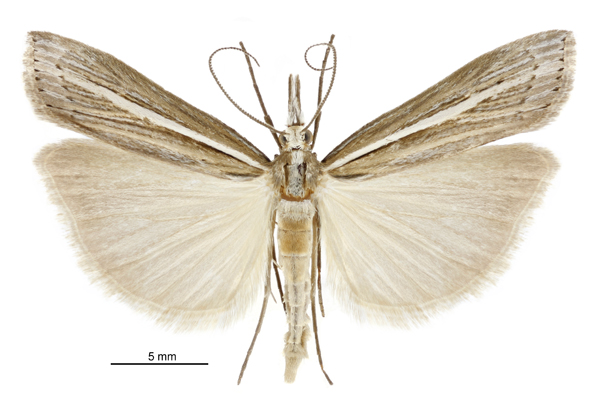
- Male

Scientific classification
- Kingdom: Animalia
- Phylum: Arthropoda
- Clade: Pancrustacea
- Class: Insecta
- Order: Lepidoptera
- Family: Crambidae
- Subfamily: Crambinae
- Tribe: Crambini
- Genus: Orocrambus
- Species: O. enchophorus

Binomial name
- Orocrambus enchophorus (Meyrick, 1885)

Synonyms
- Crambus enchophorus Meyrick, 1885; Crambus pedias Meyrick, 1885; Crambus scitulus Philpott, 1926; Crambus encophorus Bleszynski & Collins, 1962

= Orocrambus enchophorus =

Species of moth

Orocrambus enchophorus is a moth in the family Crambidae. It was described by Edward Meyrick in 1885. It is endemic to New Zealand. It has been recorded from the South Island and North Island. The lives in lowland to alpine grassland habitat.

== Description ==
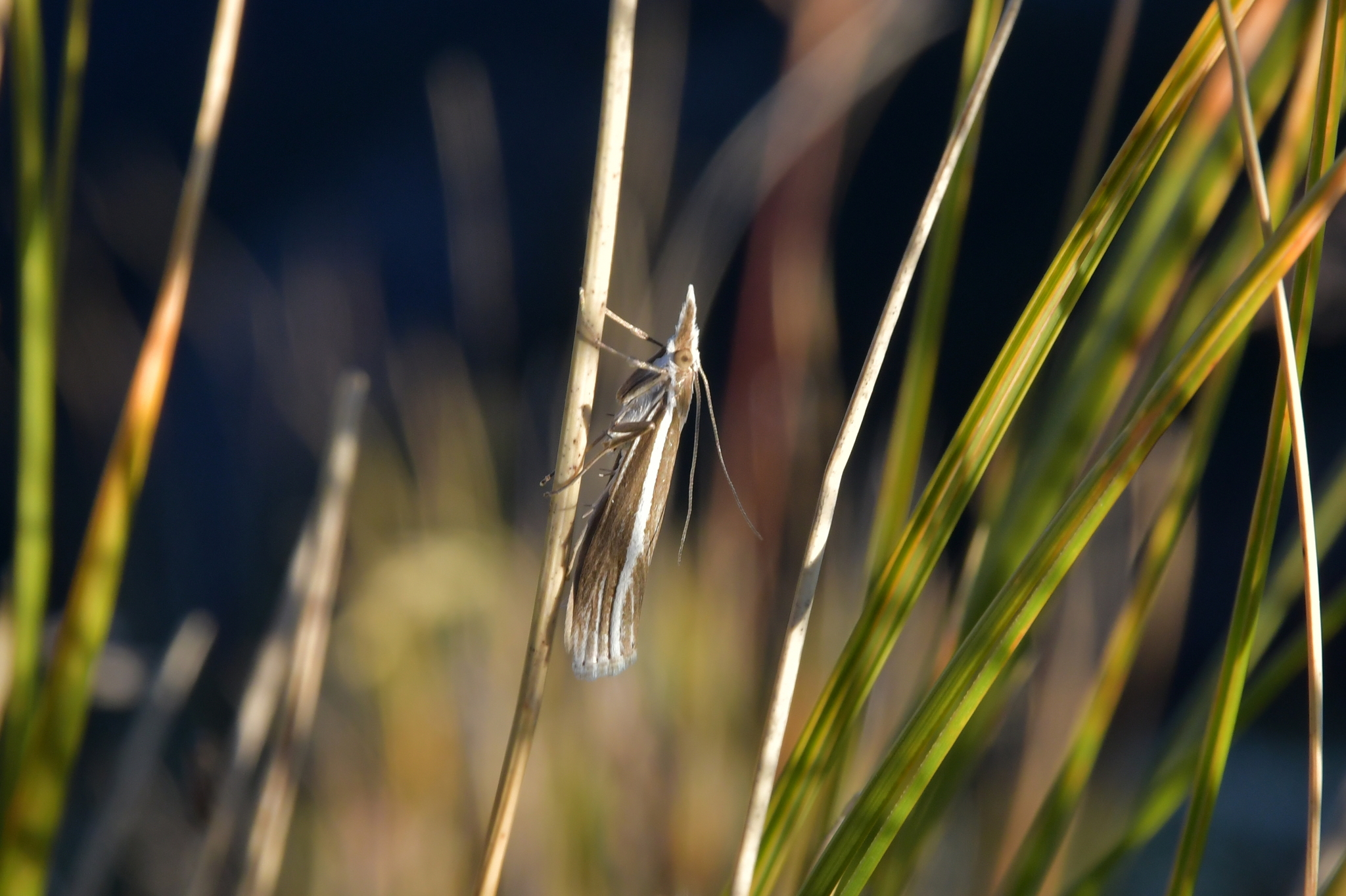
Orocrambus enchophorus

The wingspan is 24–40 mm. Adults have been recorded on wing from November to February.

The native larvae plant host is Poa cita but larvae are also associated with or have been raised on Poa annua, Agrostis tenuis, Bromus catharticus and Festuca arundinacea.
