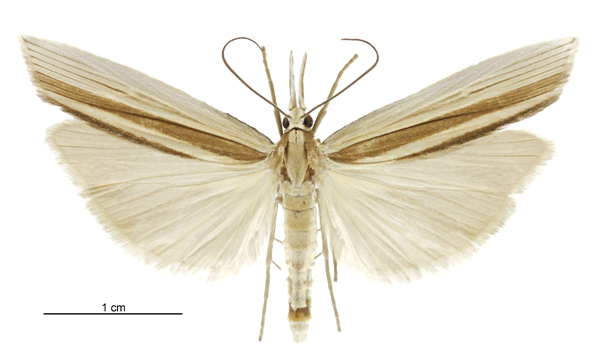
- Male
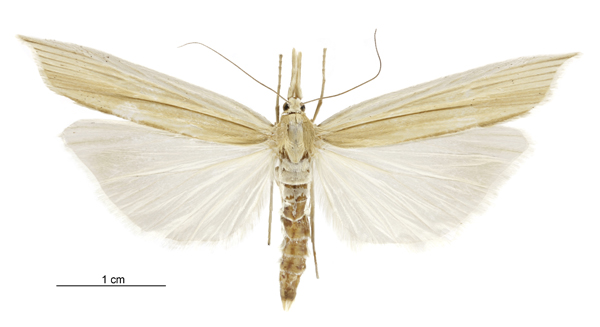
- Female

Scientific classification
- Kingdom: Animalia
- Phylum: Arthropoda
- Clade: Pancrustacea
- Class: Insecta
- Order: Lepidoptera
- Family: Crambidae
- Subfamily: Crambinae
- Tribe: Crambini
- Genus: Orocrambus
- Species: O. angustipennis

Binomial name
- Orocrambus angustipennis (Zeller, 1877)

Synonyms
- Chilo angustipennis Zeller, 1877; Crambus angustipennis (Zeller, 1877)

= Orocrambus angustipennis =

Species of moth

Orocrambus angustipennis is a species of moth in the Crambinae family. It is endemic to New Zealand. O. angustipennis is present in the North Island, South Island and the Chatham Islands.

The wingspan is 34–40 mm for males and 44–50 mm for females. Adults are on wing from November to March in two generations per year.

The larvae feed on Cortaderia, including Cortaderia selloana and Cortaderia toetoe. They feed within growing stems and blades.
