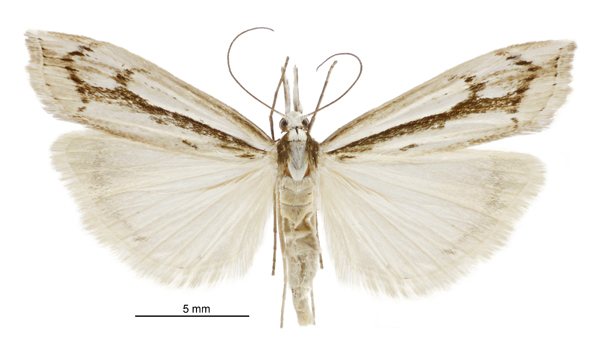
- Female
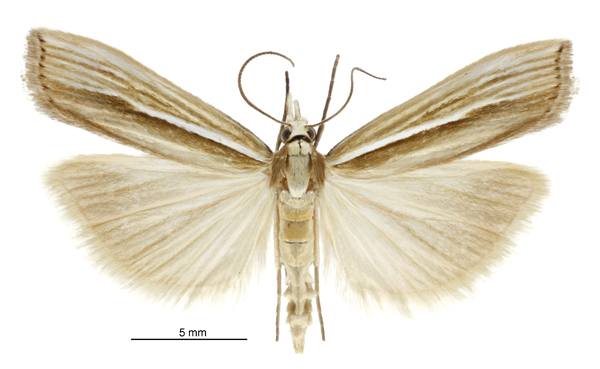
- Male

Scientific classification
- Kingdom: Animalia
- Phylum: Arthropoda
- Clade: Pancrustacea
- Class: Insecta
- Order: Lepidoptera
- Family: Crambidae
- Subfamily: Crambinae
- Tribe: Crambini
- Genus: Orocrambus
- Species: O. ramosellus

Binomial name
- Orocrambus ramosellus (Doubleday in White & Doubleday, 1843)

Synonyms
- Crambus ramosellus Doubleday in White & Doubleday, 1843; Chilo leucanialis Butler, 1877; Crambus apselias Meyrick, 1907; Crambus rangona C. Felder, R. Felder & Rogenhofer, 1875

= Orocrambus ramosellus =

Species of moth

Orocrambus ramosellus is a moth in the family Crambidae. It was described by Henry Doubleday in 1843. It is endemic to New Zealand, where it has been recorded in the North and South Islands. The habitat of this species consists of pastures.

The wingspan is 23–29 mm. Adults have been recorded on wing from October to July.

The larvae feed on Festuca novaezealandiae, Poa cita (formerly Poa caespitosa), Agrostis tenuis, Alopercus pratensis, Bromus catharticus and Poa annua.
