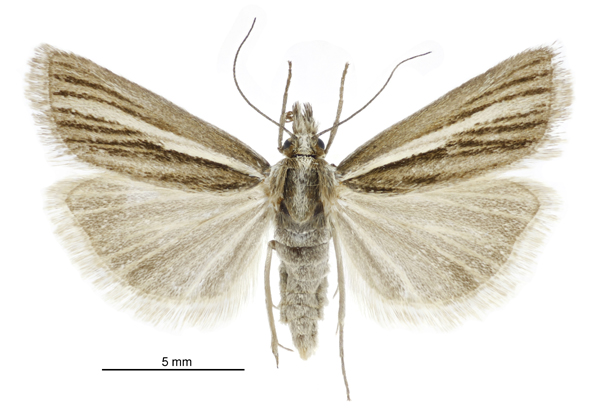
- Male

Scientific classification
- Kingdom: Animalia
- Phylum: Arthropoda
- Clade: Pancrustacea
- Class: Insecta
- Order: Lepidoptera
- Family: Crambidae
- Subfamily: Crambinae
- Tribe: Crambini
- Genus: Orocrambus
- Species: O. tritonellus

Binomial name
- Orocrambus tritonellus (Meyrick, 1885)

Synonyms
- Crambus tritonellus Meyrick, 1885

= Orocrambus tritonellus =

Species of insect

Orocrambus tritonellus is a moth in the family Crambidae. It was described by Edward Meyrick in 1885. This species is endemic to New Zealand, where it has been recorded in the central and eastern parts of the South Island. This species prefers habitat that consists of subalpine and alpine areas.

The wingspan is 18–23 mm. Adults have been recorded on wing from late September to mid-February.
