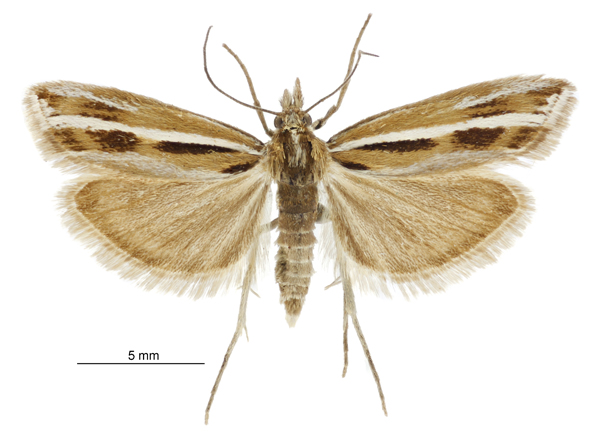
- Male
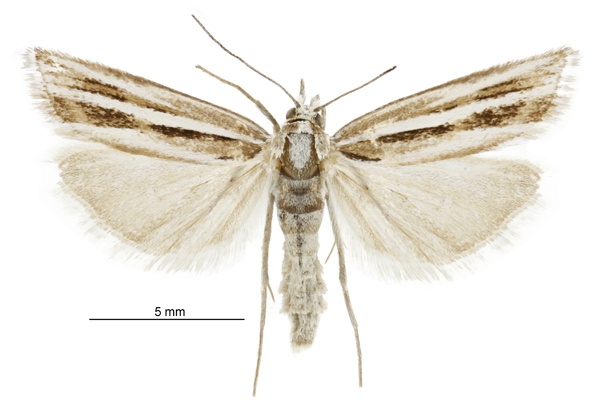
- Female

Scientific classification
- Kingdom: Animalia
- Phylum: Arthropoda
- Clade: Pancrustacea
- Class: Insecta
- Order: Lepidoptera
- Family: Crambidae
- Subfamily: Crambinae
- Tribe: Crambini
- Genus: Orocrambus
- Species: O. corruptus

Binomial name
- Orocrambus corruptus Butler, 1877

Synonyms
- Hypochalcia corrupta Butler, 1877; Orocrambus corruptus; Crambus luridus Hudson, 1923

= Orocrambus corruptus =

Species of moth

Orocrambus corruptus is a moth in the family Crambidae. It was described by Arthur Gardiner Butler in 1877. It is endemic to New Zealand. It is known from the lowland and intermontane region areas of eastern and central South Island. The habitat consists of poorly drained areas up to 750 meters and old pastures.

The wingspan is 15–20 mm. Adults have been recorded on wing from September to early December and again in February in some areas.

The larvae have been reared on Funaria species, Poa annua, Bromus dactylis and Trifolium repens.
