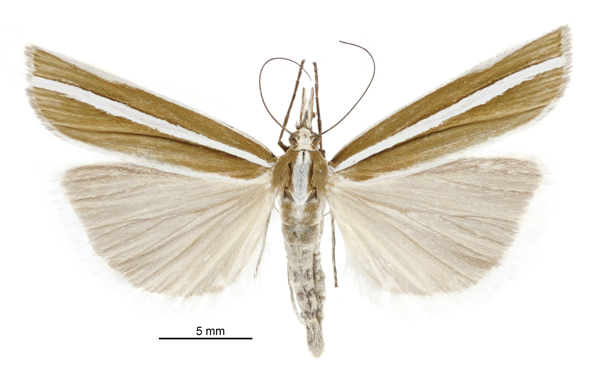
- Male

Scientific classification
- Kingdom: Animalia
- Phylum: Arthropoda
- Clade: Pancrustacea
- Class: Insecta
- Order: Lepidoptera
- Family: Crambidae
- Subfamily: Crambinae
- Tribe: Crambini
- Genus: Orocrambus
- Species: O. philpotti

Binomial name
- Orocrambus philpotti Gaskin, 1975

= Orocrambus philpotti =

Species of moth

Orocrambus philpotti is a moth in the family Crambidae. It was described by David E. Gaskin in 1975. It is endemic to New Zealand, where it has been recorded in the Tasman Mountains to Lake Tekapo in the South Island. The habitat this species prefers consists of alpine and subalpine tussock grasslands.
