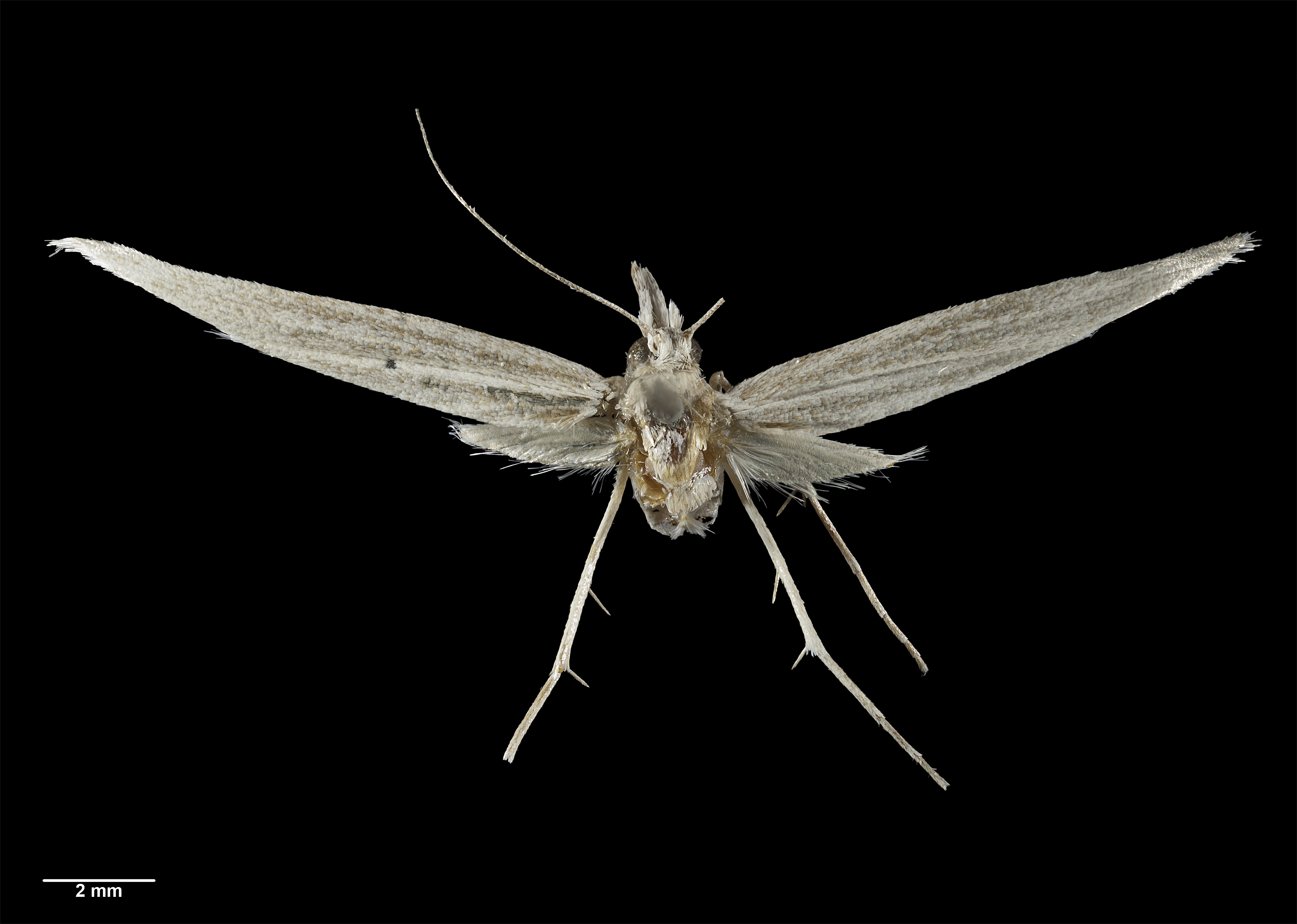
- Holotype specimen held at Auckland War Memorial Museum

Scientific classification
- Kingdom: Animalia
- Phylum: Arthropoda
- Clade: Pancrustacea
- Class: Insecta
- Order: Lepidoptera
- Family: Crambidae
- Subfamily: Crambinae
- Tribe: Crambini
- Genus: Orocrambus
- Species: O. lindsayi

Binomial name
- Orocrambus lindsayi Gaskin, 1975

= Orocrambus lindsayi =

Species of moth

Orocrambus lindsayi is a moth in the family Crambidae. It was described by David E. Gaskin in 1975. It is found in New Zealand, where it has been recorded from Mount Ida in Otago.

The wingspan is about 22 mm. Adults have been recorded in February.
