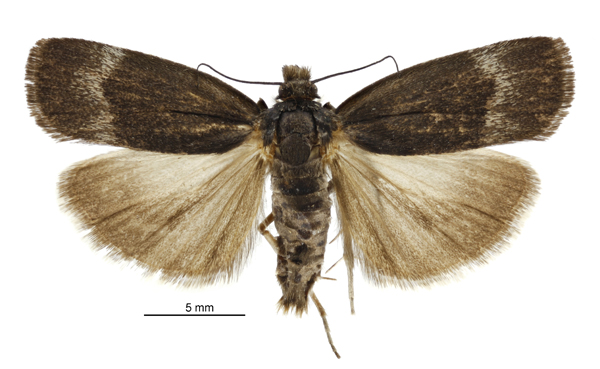
- Female
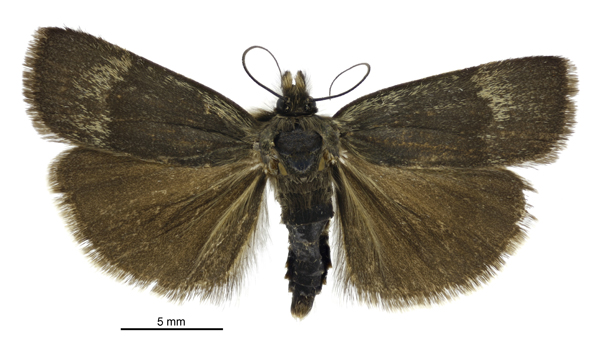
- Male

Scientific classification
- Kingdom: Animalia
- Phylum: Arthropoda
- Clade: Pancrustacea
- Class: Insecta
- Order: Lepidoptera
- Family: Crambidae
- Genus: Orocrambus
- Species: O. melampetrus

Binomial name
- Orocrambus melampetrus Alex. Purdie, 1884

Synonyms
- Orocrambus melampetrus Meyrick, 1885

= Orocrambus melampetrus =

Species of moth endemic to New Zealand

Orocrambus melampetrus is a moth in the family Crambidae. This species was first described by Alexander Purdie in 1884. It is endemic to New Zealand, where it has been recorded from the South Island. It frequents high alpine grassland and scree slope habitat at altitudes of between 4,000 feet (1,200 m) to 5,000 feet (1,500 m). The adults are day flying and are on the wing from December until February. They can be very active fliers.

== Taxonomy ==
Illustration by Hudson.

Purdie first described O. melampetrus in 1884 using 4 specimens he collected at Mount Bonpland. He stating he named in it line with an unpublished provisional name given to the proposed species by Edward Meyrick. Meyrick went on to describe the species as new under that name in January 1885 and again in more detail in May 1885. George Hudson discussed and illustrated this species in his 1928 book The butterflies and moths of New Zealand. In 1929 Alfred Philpott examined the male genitalia of this species. In 1975 David E. Gaskin examined this species in his revision of New Zealand Crambini. Both Gaskin and John S. Dugdale believed that the type or type series for this species had likely been lost. However Gaskin regarded the species as so distinctive that he saw no need to designate a neotype.

== Description ==
Sitting on scree.

Purdie described the species as follows:

The Museum specimen is brownish-black, with a transverse greyish band near the end of the cell of the forewings; my specimens have the forewings a deep glossy black, with no trace of markings.

Meyrick described the adults of this species as follows:

Male, female.—24-26 mm. Head, palpi, antenne, thorax, abdomen, and legs dark fuscous-grey ; head and palpi mixed with grey-whitish. Forewings moderate, oblong, slightly dilated posteriorly, costa gently arched, apex obtuse, hindmargin not oblique, rounded beneath; fuscous, strewn with dark grey, appearing dark fuscous-grey, with a slight bluish gloss; a whitish irroration forming a moderate nearly straight cloudy fascia (appearing grey-whitish) from 2/3 of costa to 3/4 of inner margin, very slightly curved outwards: cilia greyish-fuscous. Hindwings and cilia fuscous.

Hudson described the egg as follows:

The egg is barrel-shaped, with about 14 longitudinal ribs, and fine transverse lines between each rib. Colour ochreous-white. Length about one-fortieth of an inch.

The adults of this species is variable in the colour of the stripe running across the wing, with the stripe ranging in colour from a rich deep brown to a pale brownish yellow. The palpi of this species are very hairy and the dark ground colour assists the adults to absorb heat from the sun and may also assist the moth to survive the dryness of its habitat in the summer months.

== Distribution ==
This species is endemic to New Zealand. It has been observed in the South Island. Auckland War Memorial Museum also holds a specimen collected at Kapiti Island that purports to be this species.

== Habitat ==
The preferred habitat of this species consists of high alpine grasslands and scree slopes.

== Behaviour ==
Adults of this species are day flying and can be observed sitting on bare shingle slopes (which it imitates in colour) at an elevation of 4,000 feet (1,200 m) to 5,000 feet (1,500 m). O. melampetrus is a very active flyer.
