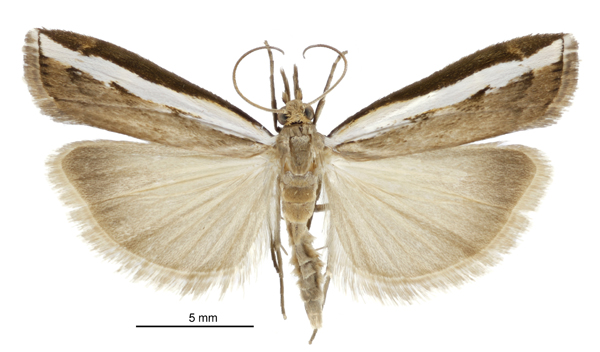
- Male

Scientific classification
- Kingdom: Animalia
- Phylum: Arthropoda
- Clade: Pancrustacea
- Class: Insecta
- Order: Lepidoptera
- Family: Crambidae
- Subfamily: Crambinae
- Tribe: Crambini
- Genus: Orocrambus
- Species: O. flexuosellus

Binomial name
- Orocrambus flexuosellus (Doubleday, 1843)

Synonyms
- Crambus flexuosellus Doubleday, 1843

= Orocrambus flexuosellus =

Species of moth

Orocrambus flexuosellus is a species of moth in the family Crambidae. It was first described by Edward Doubleday in 1843. O. flexuosellus is endemic to New Zealand. It has been recorded from the North Island, South Island and the Stewart Islands. The species' habitat consists of lowland to alpine grasslands.

The wingspan is 19–26 mm. Adults have been recorded on wing from November to February. Adults are nocturnal but are easily disturbed during daylight hours.

The larvae are polyphagous, feeding on various grasses and sedges. Adults are attracted to light and have been collected via a mercury vapour light trap. The adult moths have been shown to pollinate Cassinia fulvida, Dracophyllum acerosum, Hoheria lyallii and Olearia virgata.
