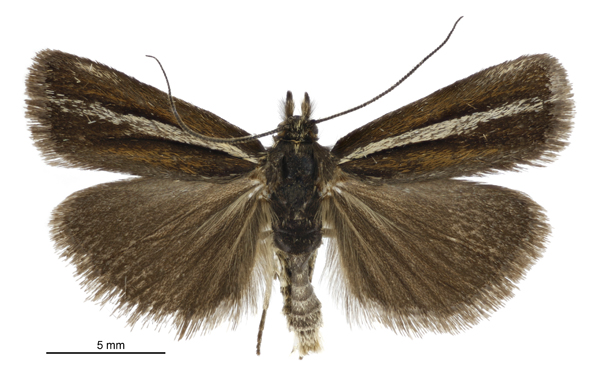
- Male
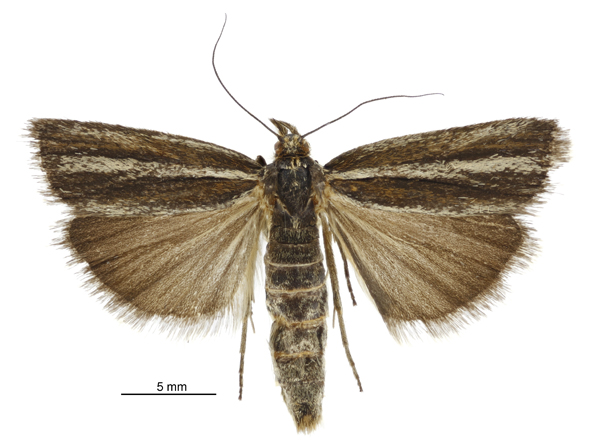
- Female

Scientific classification
- Kingdom: Animalia
- Phylum: Arthropoda
- Clade: Pancrustacea
- Class: Insecta
- Order: Lepidoptera
- Family: Crambidae
- Subfamily: Crambinae
- Tribe: Crambini
- Genus: Orocrambus
- Species: O. mylites

Binomial name
- Orocrambus mylites Meyrick, 1888

= Orocrambus mylites =

Species of moth

Orocrambus mylites is a moth in the family Crambidae. It was described by Edward Meyrick in 1888. It is endemic to New Zealand, where it has been recorded in Nelson and Marlborough. It is found in the alpine zone.

The wingspan is 19–25 mm. The forewings are bluish-brown with greyish fascia. Adults are on wing from December to February.

The larvae feed on Chionochloa australis.
