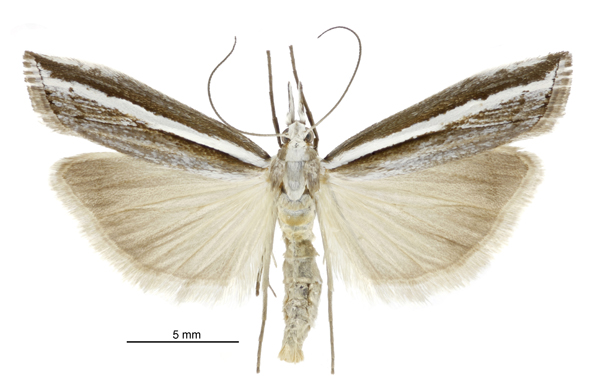
- Female
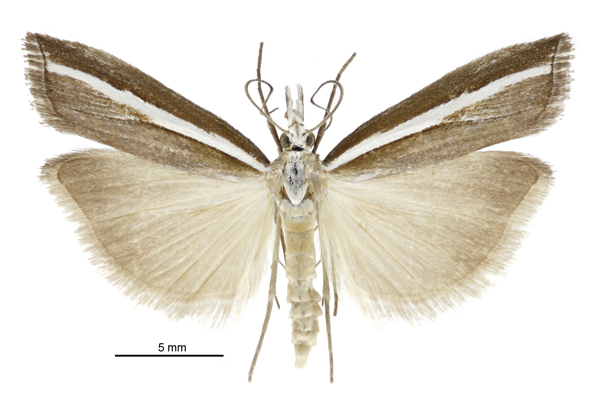
- Male

Scientific classification
- Kingdom: Animalia
- Phylum: Arthropoda
- Clade: Pancrustacea
- Class: Insecta
- Order: Lepidoptera
- Family: Crambidae
- Subfamily: Crambinae
- Tribe: Crambini
- Genus: Orocrambus
- Species: O. vittellus

Binomial name
- Orocrambus vittellus (Doubleday in White and Doubleday, 1843)

Synonyms
- Crambus vittellus Doubleday in White and Doubleday, 1843; Crambus bisectellus Zeller, 1863; Crambus bissectellus Bleszynski & Collins, 1962; Crambus conopias Meyrick, 1907; Crambus incrassatellus Zeller, 1863; Crambus nexalis Walker, 1863; Crambus sublicellus Zeller, 1863; Crambus transcissalis Walker, 1863; Crambus vapidus Butler, 1877; Crambus rapidus Dugdale, 1988; Crambus vitellus Walker, 1863

= Orocrambus vittellus =

Species of moth

Orocrambus vittellus is a moth in the family Crambidae. It was described by Henry Doubleday in 1843. It is endemic to New Zealand. This species has been recorded in the North and South Islands, as well as Stewart Island. It prefers a habitat that consists of grasslands.

The wingspan is 19–28 mm. Adults have been recorded on wing from November to April.

The larvae feed on Agrostis tenuis and probably other grasses.
