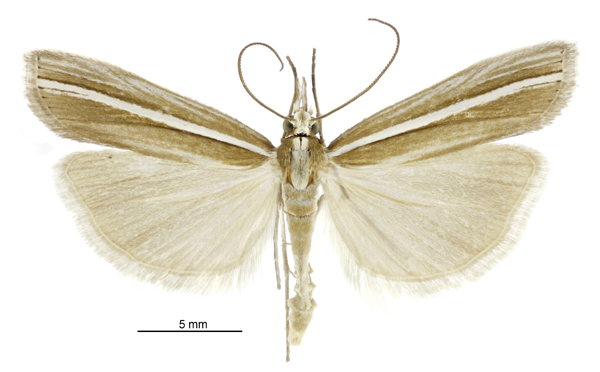
- Male

Scientific classification
- Kingdom: Animalia
- Phylum: Arthropoda
- Clade: Pancrustacea
- Class: Insecta
- Order: Lepidoptera
- Family: Crambidae
- Subfamily: Crambinae
- Tribe: Crambini
- Genus: Orocrambus
- Species: O. callirrhous

Binomial name
- Orocrambus callirrhous (Meyrick, 1882)

Synonyms
- Crambus callirrhous Meyrick, 1882; Crambus callirhous Bleszynski & Collins, 1962; Crambus schedias Meyrick, 1911

= Orocrambus callirrhous =

Species of moth

Orocrambus callirrhous is a moth in the family Crambidae. It was described by Edward Meyrick in 1883. It is endemic to New Zealand. It has been recorded from the eastern and central part of the South Island and the coast near Wellington and Whangārei on the North Island.

== Taxonomy ==
O. callirrhous was first described by Edward Meyrick in June 1882 and named Crambus callirrhous. Meyrick gave a fuller description of this species in May 1883. The lectotype specimen, collected at Lake Guyon by R. E. Fereday, is held at the Natural History Museum, London.

== Description ==
The wingspan is 24–32 mm. Adults have been recorded on wing from December to April.

== Hosts ==
The larvae feed on Festuca novaezealandiae.
