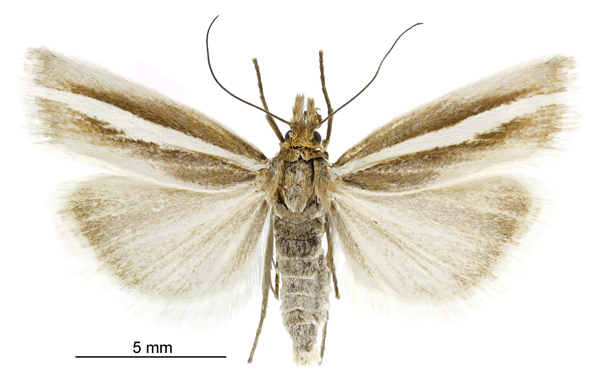
- Female
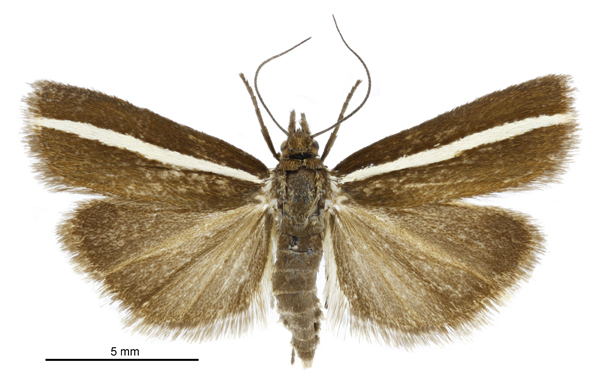
- Male

Scientific classification
- Kingdom: Animalia
- Phylum: Arthropoda
- Clade: Pancrustacea
- Class: Insecta
- Order: Lepidoptera
- Family: Crambidae
- Subfamily: Crambinae
- Tribe: Crambini
- Genus: Orocrambus
- Species: O. aethonellus

Binomial name
- Orocrambus aethonellus (Meyrick, 1882)

Synonyms
- Crambus aethonellus Meyrick, 1882; Crambus antimorus Meyrick, 1901; Crambus aulistes Meyrick, 1909; Crambus heteranthes Meyrick, 1901; Crambus meristes Meyrick, 1919; Crambus meritus Philpott, 1929; Crambus saristes Meyrick, 1909

= Orocrambus aethonellus =

Species of moth endemic to New Zealand

Orocrambus aethonellus is a moth in the family Crambidae. It was first described by Edward Meyrick in 1882. It is endemic to New Zealand. O. aethonellus has been recorded from the South Island. The habitat favoured by this moth includes sand hills and bogs from sea level up to altitudes of about 1,200 meters.

== Taxonomy ==
O. aethonellus was first described by Edward Meyrick in 1882 and originally named Crambus aethonellus. Meyrick gave a fuller description of this species in May 1883. George Hudson, in his 1928 book The butterflies and moths of New Zealand, discussed this species under the name Crambus aethonellus. In 1975 D. E. Gaskin revised New Zealand Crambini and placed this species in the genus Orocrambus. The lectotype specimen, collected at Mount Hutt by R. E. Fereday, is held at the Natural History Museum, London.

== Description ==
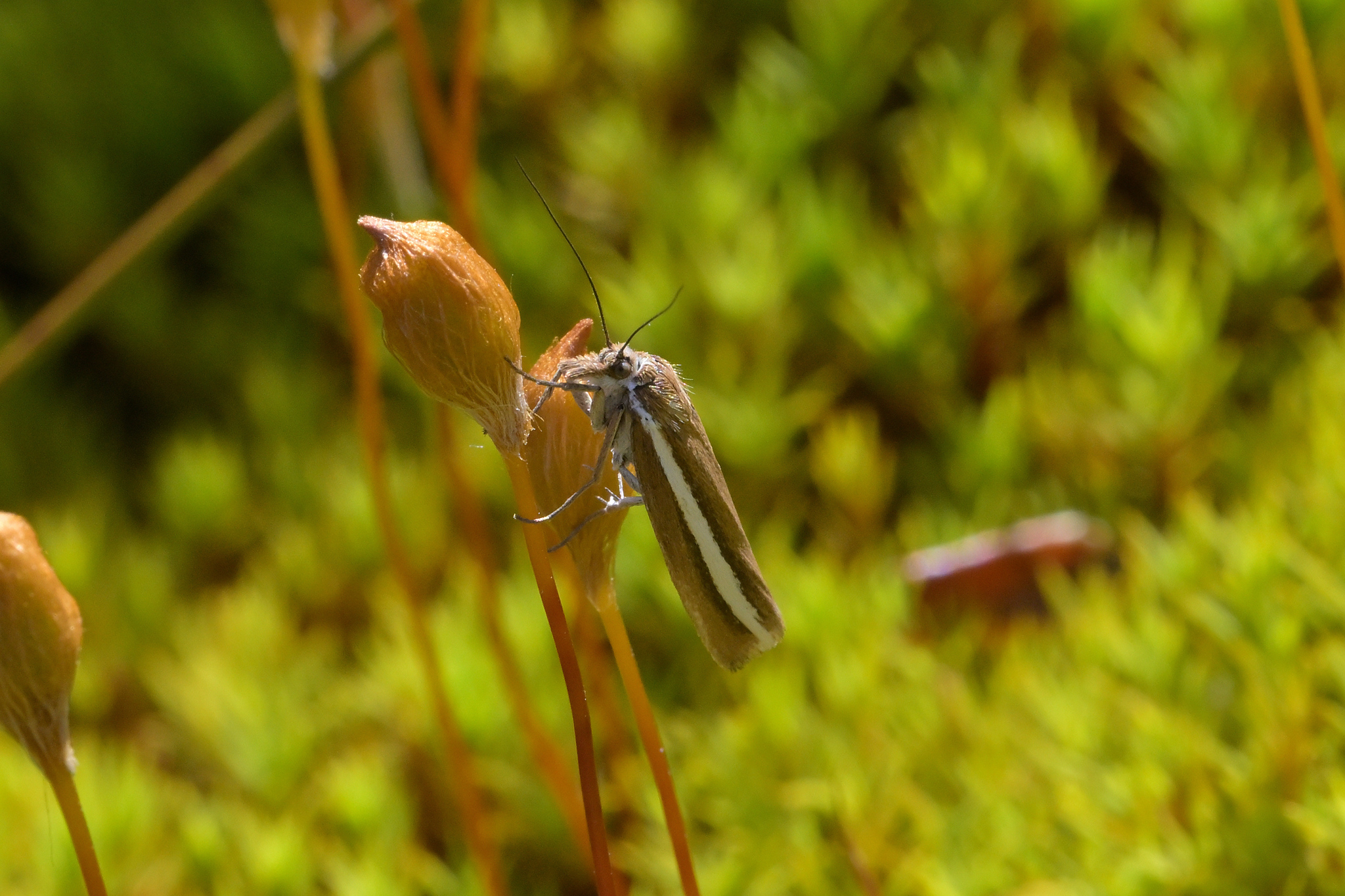
Living O. aethonellus.

The wingspan is 13–20 mm for males and 15–21 mm for females.

Meyrick described this species as follows:

Male.—18-19 mm. Head, palpi, and thorax deep ochreous-brown, shoulders with a small yellowish-white spot; palpi rather short, beneath ochreous-white towards base. Antenne dark fuscous. Abdomen dark fuscous, gradually suffused with pale ochreous posteriorly. Anterior and middle legs dark fuscous; posterior legs whitish-ochreous, apex of tarsi infuscated. Forewings short, moderately broad, costa almost straight, apex almost acute, hindmargin very slightly sinuate, nearly straight, moderately oblique ; rather bright deep ochreous-brown; costal edge narrowly ochreous-whitish, becoming gradually more ochreous towards base ; inner marginal edge sometimes very narrowly ochreous-whitish ; a straight moderately broad central longitudinal ochreous-white streak from base to hindmargin, attenuated on basal third and before hindmargin, more or less distinctly margined with dark fuscous: cilia pale whitish-ochreous, on basal third light grey, with a distinct ochreous-white spot on central streak. Hindwings dark fuscous ; cilia ochreous-white or whitish-ochreous, with a grey basal line.

== Distribution ==
This species is endemic to New Zealand.

== Habitat and hosts ==
The habitat favoured by this moth includes sand hills and bogs from sea level up to altitudes of about 1,200 meters.

== Behaviour ==
Adults have been recorded on wing from late October to late January.
