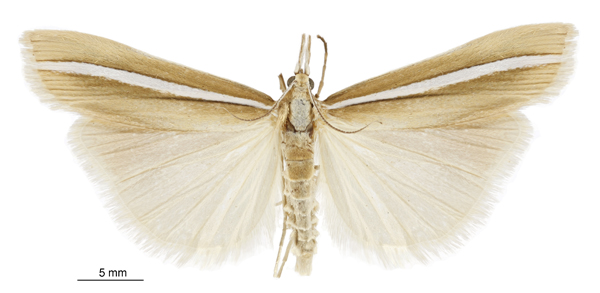
- Male

Scientific classification
- Kingdom: Animalia
- Phylum: Arthropoda
- Clade: Pancrustacea
- Class: Insecta
- Order: Lepidoptera
- Family: Crambidae
- Subfamily: Crambinae
- Tribe: Crambini
- Genus: Orocrambus
- Species: O. crenaeus

Binomial name
- Orocrambus crenaeus (Meyrick, 1885)

Synonyms
- Crambus crenaeus Meyrick, 1885; Crambus craeneus Bleszynski & Collins, 1962; Crambus diplorrhous Meyrick, 1885

= Orocrambus crenaeus =

Species of moth

Orocrambus crenaeus is a moth in the family Crambidae. It was described by Edward Meyrick in 1885. It is endemic to New Zealand, where it is known from the South Island. The habitat consists of alpine grasslands.

The wingspan is 31–38 mm. Adults have been recorded on wing from December to February. Adults of this moth are known to pollinate Brachyscome sinclairii.
