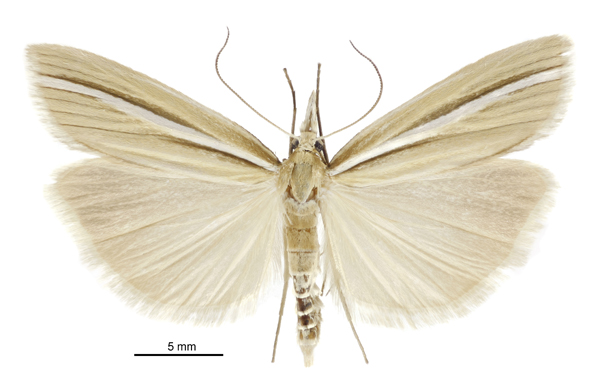
- Male
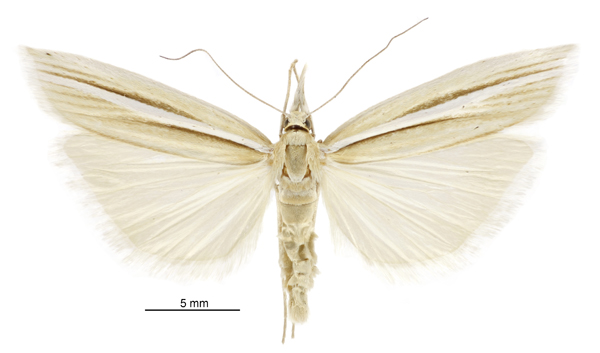
- Female

Scientific classification
- Kingdom: Animalia
- Phylum: Arthropoda
- Clade: Pancrustacea
- Class: Insecta
- Order: Lepidoptera
- Family: Crambidae
- Subfamily: Crambinae
- Tribe: Crambini
- Genus: Orocrambus
- Species: O. simplex

Binomial name
- Orocrambus simplex (Butler, 1877)

Synonyms
- Chilo simplex Butler, 1877

= Orocrambus simplex =

Species of moth

Orocrambus simplex is a moth in the family Crambidae. It was described by Arthur Gardiner Butler in 1877. It is endemic to New Zealand, where it has been recorded in Westland, Nelson Province, the central part of the North Island and the coastal area of southern Hawkes Bay. The habitat where this species lives consists of tussock grasslands.

The wingspan is 25–33 mm. Adults have been recorded on wing from November to February.

Larvae have been reared from Chionochloa rubra, Poa cita (formerly Poa caespitosa) and Poa annua.
