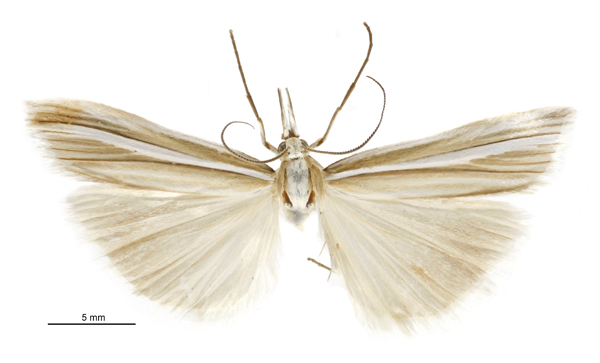
- Male

Scientific classification
- Kingdom: Animalia
- Phylum: Arthropoda
- Clade: Pancrustacea
- Class: Insecta
- Order: Lepidoptera
- Family: Crambidae
- Subfamily: Crambinae
- Tribe: Crambini
- Genus: Orocrambus
- Species: O. lewisi

Binomial name
- Orocrambus lewisi Gaskin, 1975

= Orocrambus lewisi =

Species of moth

Orocrambus lewisi is a moth in the family Crambidae. It was described by David E. Gaskin in 1975. It is endemic to New Zealand, where it has been recorded from the South Island, Stephens Island and the south-west tip of the North Island.

The wingspan is 28–30 mm. Adults have been recorded from October to March.

The larvae feed on Poa cita (formerly Poa caespitosa).
