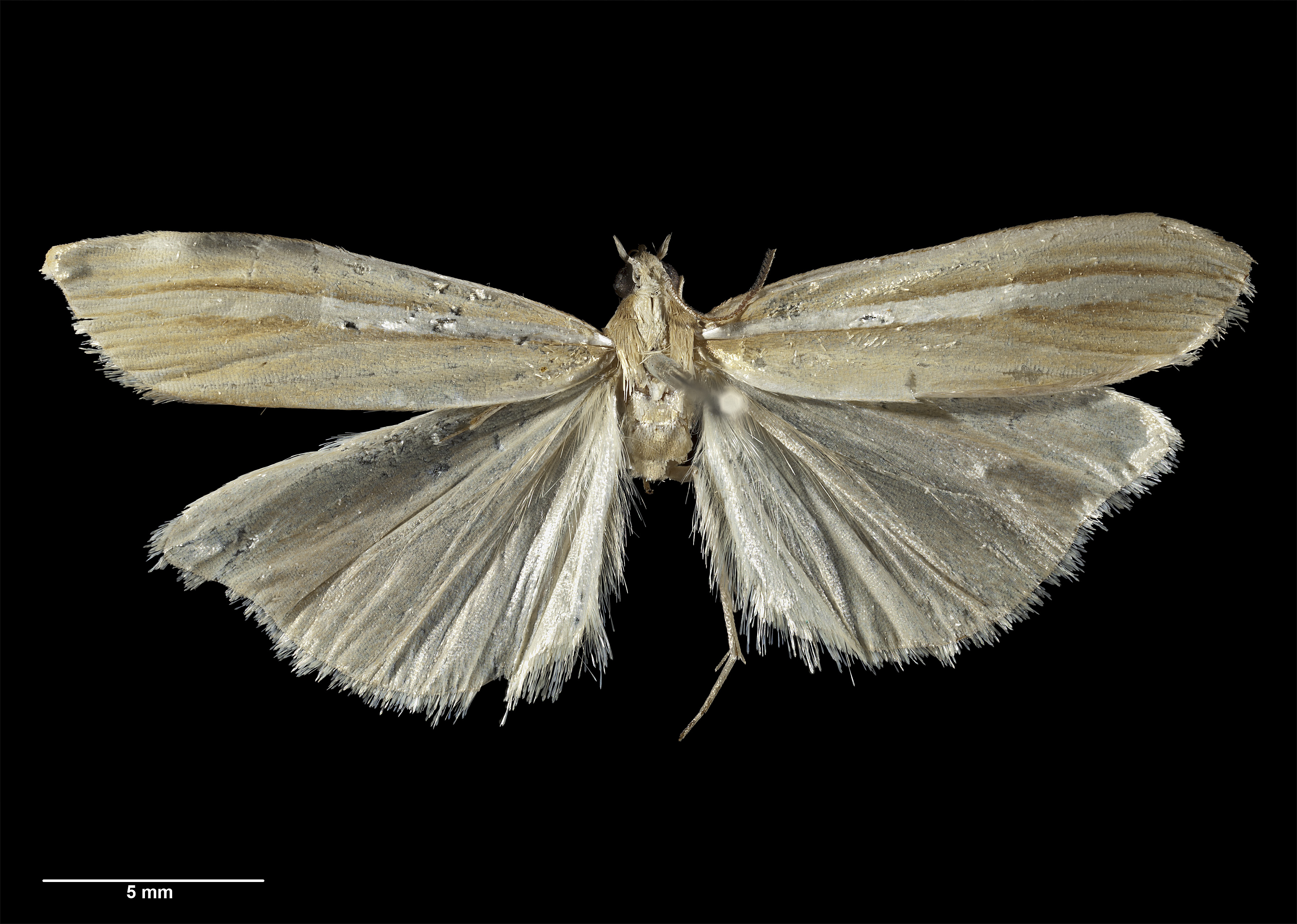

Scientific classification
- Kingdom: Animalia
- Phylum: Arthropoda
- Clade: Pancrustacea
- Class: Insecta
- Order: Lepidoptera
- Family: Crambidae
- Subfamily: Crambinae
- Tribe: Crambini
- Genus: Orocrambus
- Species: O. ordishi

Binomial name
- Orocrambus ordishi Gaskin, 1975

= Orocrambus ordishi =

Species of moth

Orocrambus ordishi is a moth in the family Crambidae. It was described by David E. Gaskin in 1975. This species is endemic to New Zealand, where it has been recorded from the central and eastern part of the South Island.

The wingspan is 30–34 mm for males and 28–32 mm for females. Adults are on wing from late December to April.
