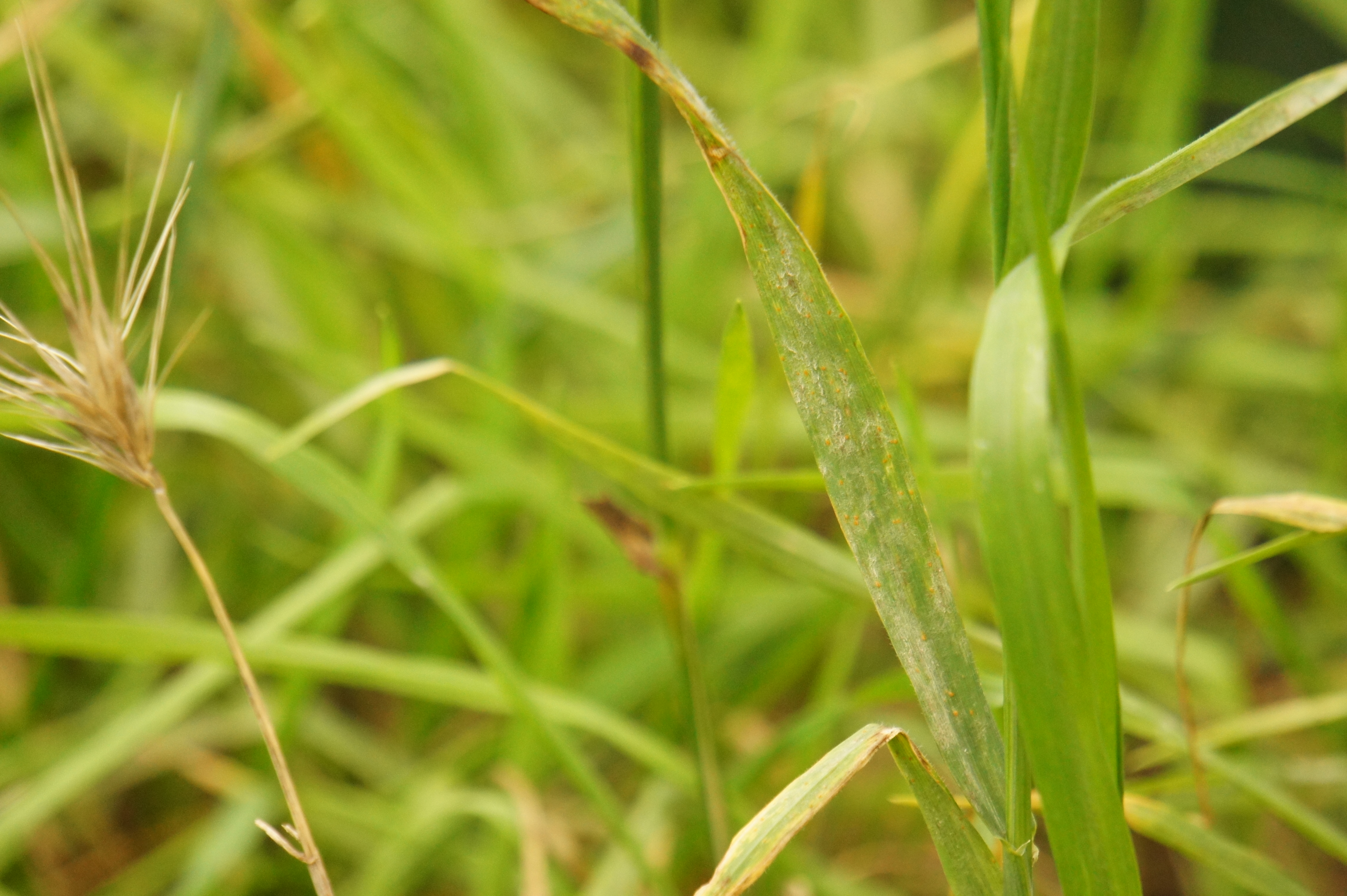
- Blumeria hordei on Hordeum murinum in the UK

Scientific classification
- Kingdom: Fungi
- Division: Ascomycota
- Class: Leotiomycetes
- Order: Helotiales
- Family: Erysiphaceae
- Genus: Blumeria
- Species: B. hordei

Binomial name
- Blumeria hordei M. Liu & Hambl., 2021

Synonyms
- Erysiphe graminis f. hordei-culti Jacz., 1927; Erysiphe graminis f. hordei-spontanei Jacz., 1927; Erysiphe graminis f. sp. hordei E. Marchal, 1902

= Blumeria hordei =

Species of fungus

Blumeria hordei is a species of powdery mildew in the family Erysiphaceae. It is found across the world on every continent bar Antarctica, where it infects plants in the genus Hordeum (barley). It has also been recorded on Agrostis exarata, Alopecurus aequalis, and Bromus.

== Description ==
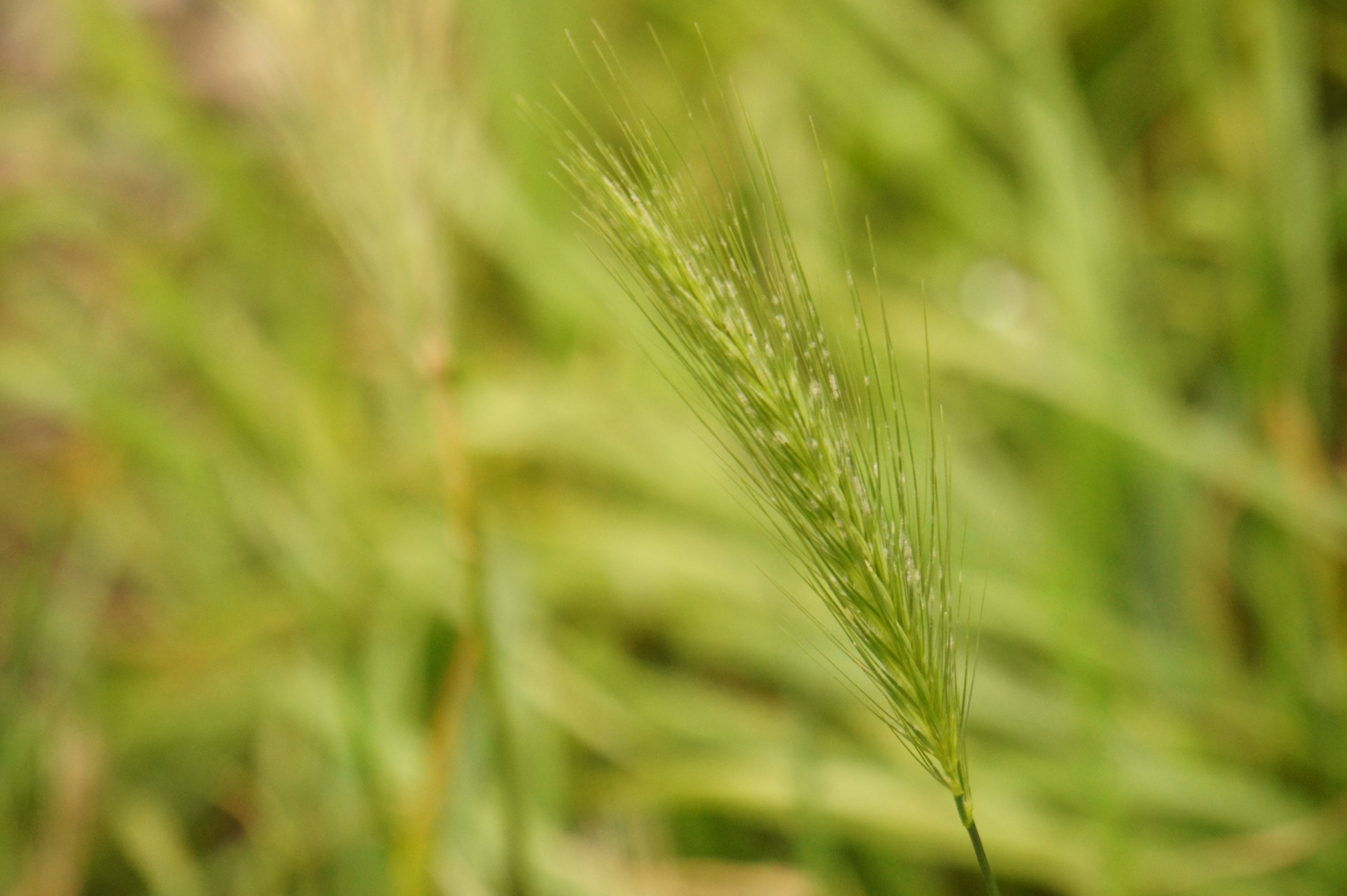
This species also infects inflorescences

The fungus forms thick white mycelial growth on the leaves of its hosts, which becomes pigmented greyish-brown with age. The mycelium is formed in spring and summer. Secondary mycelium is said to be dingy greyish-white to grey. When present, the chasmothecia are often densely packed. As with most Erysiphaceae, Blumeria hordei is highly host-specific, almost exclusively occurring on Hordeum species. Hordeum is also a host for multiple other species of Blumeria, including B. americana, B. graminis and B. dactylidis. Other hosts of B. hordei include Agrostis exarata, Alopecurus aequalis, and Bromus species. These often rather host other species of Blumeria, such as Blumeria graminicola on Alopecurus and Blumeria bulbigera and Blumeria bromi-cathartici on Bromus. Other genera of grasses host other Blumeria species, many of which are likely undescribed. Blumeria hordei can be found worldwide, wherever its host species are found.

== Taxonomy ==
Powdery mildew on Hordeum was first described by E. Marchal in 1902 as Erysiphe graminis f.sp. hordei, although formae speciales have no standing in the Code. M. Liu and Hambleton described the species Blumeria hordei in 2021 during a taxonomic review of Blumeria. Prior to this, all powdery mildews on grass hosts were considered to belong to Blumeria graminis. The variation in this species had been long observed, and many formae and formae speciales were created throughout the twentieth century. B. hordei was just one of seven new species described when Blumeria graminis was split up. The type specimen was collected on Hordeum vulgare in Quebec, Canada. The specific epithet refers to its host genus.

== Pathology ==
Blumeria hordei affects a commercially vital crop, barley, and has been reported as one of the most costly diseases of the world's most produced crops. Consequently, Blumeria hordei, especially in its former state as a forma specialis of Blumeria graminis, has (like B. graminis sensu stricto) studied at great length for both host resistance genes (to the mildew) and mildew resistance genes (to fungicides). The species is regarded as a useful route to identifying resistances in cultivated barley. Currently, most conventional treatments involve the application of fungicides, but work has been done to investigate breeding infection-resistant varieties of barley.

Due to its prevalence globally and its host specificity to a vital crop species, management of Blumeria hordei has been a high priority for millennia of barley producers. In the modern day, the most common management technique is the application of fungicides. As well as conventional fungicides, another chemical treatment for species of Blumeria involves treating barley with a silicon solution or calcium silicate slag. Silicon helps the plant cells defend against fungal attack by degrading haustoria and by producing callose and papilla. With silicon treatment, epidermal cells are less susceptible to powdery mildew.

Another way to control wheat powdery mildew is breeding in genetic resistance, using resistance genes to prevent infection. Many powdery mildew resistance alleles continue to be discovered in barley. However, Blumeria hordei can and has evolved to counteract the resistance provided by some alleles.

== Micromorphology ==
=== Description ===
The primary mycelium is not inhibited by the secondary mycelium. It is effuse or typically in patches, at first white, becoming pigmented, greyish-yellow to greyish-brown. The secondary mycelium is dense, appearing woolly to felt-like. It occurs on the leaf in patches, often around chasmothecia. It is coloured dingy greyish white to grey. The hyphal appressoria are described as nipple-shaped, occurring in opposite pairs. Conidia are broad and ellipsoid-ovoid. Conidiophores are single or in pairs, with a swollen foot-cell characteristic of the genus. They can be branched or unbranched, with a basal septum at the junction with the mother cell or elevated up to 10 μm high. The asci are typically broad ellipsoid-ovoid with short stalks. Ascospores were not observed by M. Liu et al.

=== Measurements ===
Primary hyphal cells measure 3–6 μm wide. Hyphal appressoria are 3–6 μm wide. Conidiophores are 60–120 × 5–7 μm with foot cells measuring 25–45 × 5–7 μm and varying between 10–15 μm wide in the middle and 5–7 μm wide at the basal septum. Conidia are 23–38 × 12–18 μm. The chasmothecia are 170–285 μm in diameter when mature.
