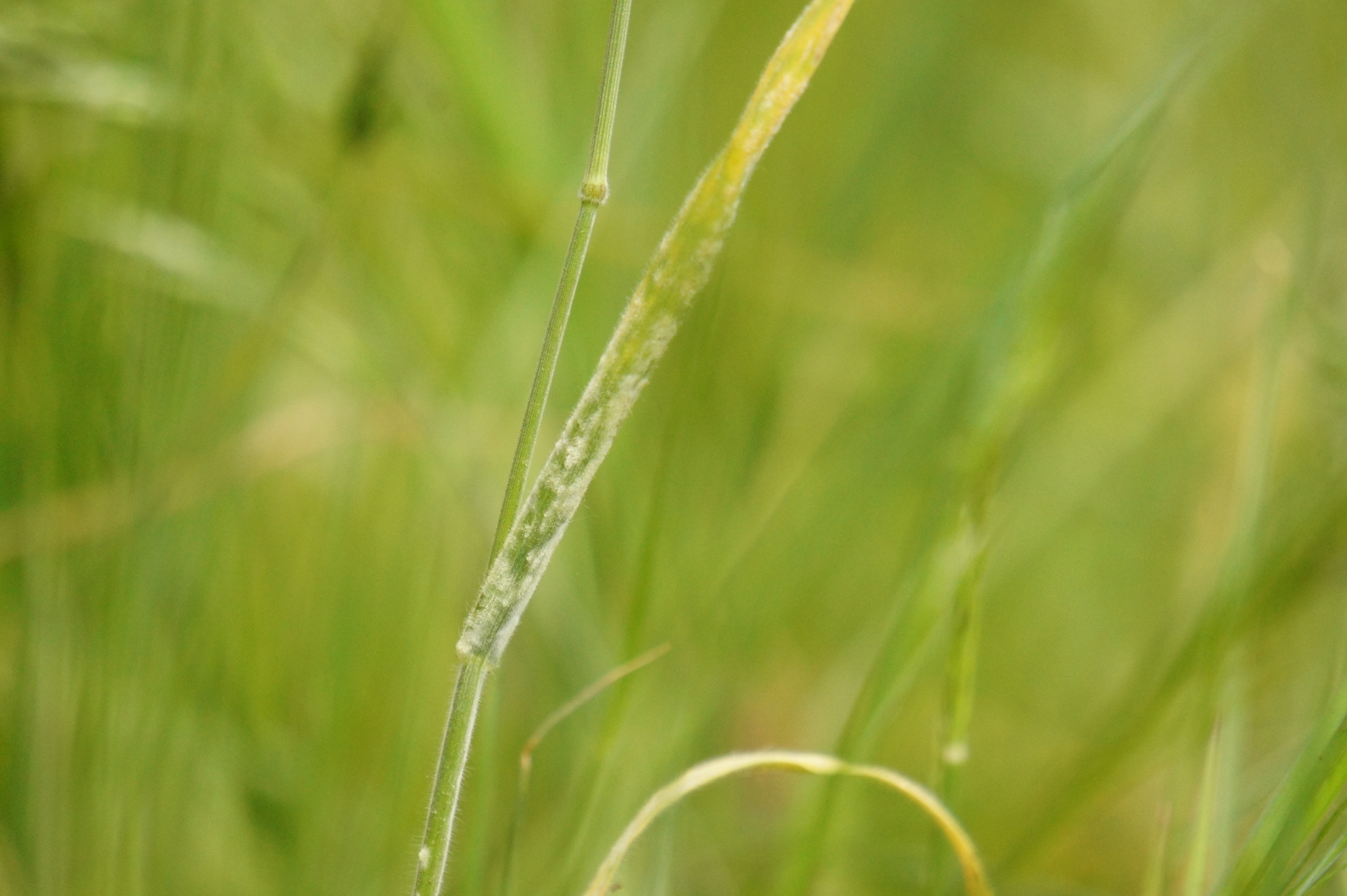
- Blumeria bulbigera on Bromus hordeaceus

Scientific classification
- Kingdom: Fungi
- Division: Ascomycota
- Class: Leotiomycetes
- Order: Helotiales
- Family: Erysiphaceae
- Genus: Blumeria
- Species: B. bulbigera

Binomial name
- Blumeria bulbigera (Bonord.) M. Liu & U. Braun, 2021

Synonyms
- Torula bulbigera Bonord., 1860; Oidium bulbigerum (Bonord.) Sacc. & Voglino, 1886; Oidium monilioides var. ochraceum Thüm., 1874; Oidium ochraceum (Thüm.) Mussat, 1901; Erysiphe graminis f. sp. bromi E. Marchal, 1902

= Blumeria bulbigera =

Species of fungus

Blumeria bulbigera is a species of powdery mildew in the family Erysiphaceae. It is found across the world on every continent bar Antarctica, where it infects plants in the genus Bromus (bromes).

== Description ==
The fungus forms thick white mycelial growth on the leaves of its hosts, which becomes pigmented ochraceous with age. The mycelium is formed from spring until late summer or autumn. When present, the chasmothecia are often densely packed. As with most Erysiphaceae, Blumeria bulbigera is highly host-specific, only occurring on Bromus species. One other species of powdery mildew infects Bromus, namely Blumeria bromi-cathartici on Bromus catharticus (rescue brome), and other genera of grasses host other Blumeria species, many of which are likely undescribed. Blumeria bulbigera can be found worldwide, wherever its host species are found.

== Taxonomy ==
Blumeria bulbigera was first described by Bonorden in 1860 as Torula bulbigera. The species was later placed in the anamorphic genus Oidium. M. Liu and Uwe Braun described the new combination Blumeria bulbigera in 2021 during a taxonomic review of Blumeria. Prior to this, all powdery mildews on grass hosts were considered to belong to Blumeria graminis. The variation in this species had been long observed, and many formae and formae speciales were created throughout the twentieth century, including Erysiphe graminis f.sp. bromi which represented this taxon. B. bulbigera was just one of seven new species described when Blumeria graminis was split up. The type specimen was collected in Germany on Bromus hordeaceus. The specific epithet refers to the swellings in the middle or end of the primary hyphae.

== Micromorphology ==
=== Description ===
The primary mycelium is effuse or typically in patches, at first whitish, later pigmented. The secondary mycelium occurs on the leaf in patches, often around chasmothecia. Conidia are broad and ellipsoid-ovoid and occasionally lemon-shaped. Conidiophores are usually near or next to one septum, and are erect, single or in pairs, with a swollen foot-cell characteristic of the genus. The chasmothecia (fruiting bodies) are loosely surrounded by secondary hyphae or may be exposed. The asci are typically ovoid and short-stalked.

=== Measurements ===
Primary hyphal cells measure 3–7 μm wide. Secondary hyphal cells measure 4–7 μm wide. Conidiophores are 80–130 × 5–6 μm with foot cells measuring 25–45 × 5–6 μm. Conidia are 27–35 × 13–18.5 μm. The chasmothecia are 150–200 μm in diameter when mature.
