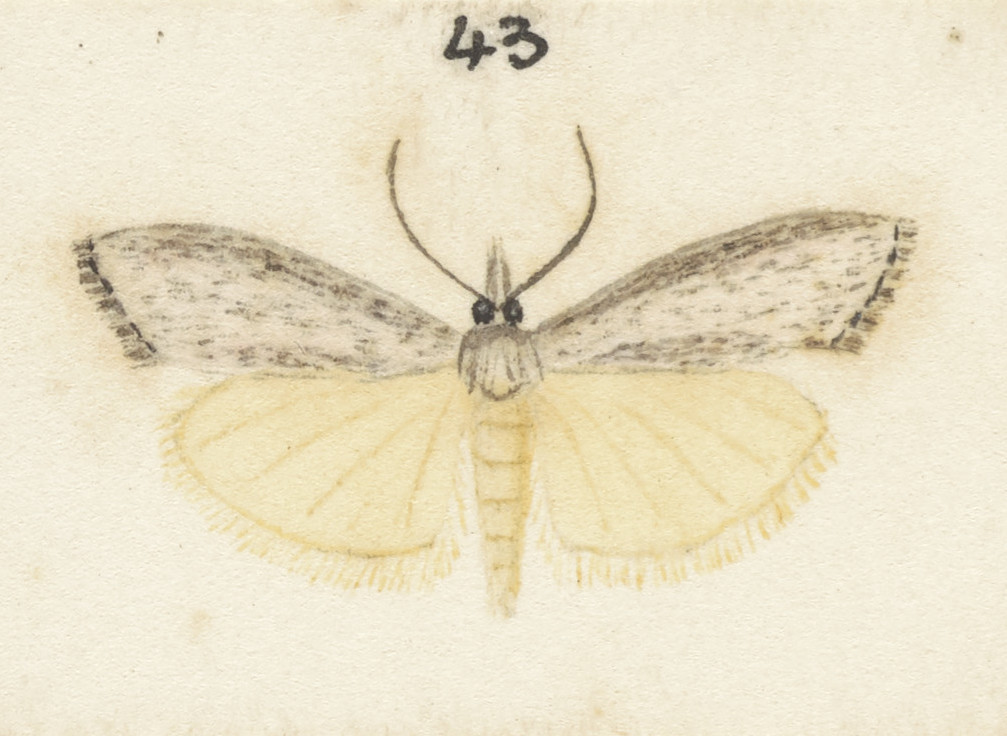
- Illustration of male

Scientific classification
- Kingdom: Animalia
- Phylum: Arthropoda
- Clade: Pancrustacea
- Class: Insecta
- Order: Lepidoptera
- Family: Crambidae
- Subfamily: Crambinae
- Tribe: Crambini
- Genus: Orocrambus
- Species: O. sophronellus

Binomial name
- Orocrambus sophronellus (Meyrick, 1885)

Synonyms
- Crambus sophronellus Meyrick, 1885

= Orocrambus sophronellus =

Species of moth

Orocrambus sophronellus is a moth in the family Crambidae. This species is regarded as being taxonomically unresolved. It is endemic to New Zealand and has been observed in the South Island. O. sophronellus inhabits short tussock grassland and are said to be associated with Carex muelleri. Adult moths are attracted to the lights and have been recorded on wing in March. In 2025 this species was classified as "data deficient" under the New Zealand Threat Classification System.

== Taxonomy ==
This species was first described by Edward Meyrick in 1885, from a specimen given to him by Richard William Fereday. Meyrick named the species Crambus sophronellus. Meyrick gave a more detailed description of the species later that year. In 1928 George Vernon Hudson also described and illustrated the species. In 1975 David E. Gaskin placed the species in the genus Orocrambus. Gaskin argues that Hudsons illustration in his 1928 book is actually of the species O. cyclopicus. As at 2025 this species is regarded as being taxonomically unresolved.

The type locality of the specimen is uncertain but is possibly Canterbury. The type specimen is held at the Natural History Museum, London.

== Description ==
Meyrick described the species as follows:

Female. — 19 mm. Head and thorax ochreous-white, coarsely irrorated with greyish-fuscous. Palpi long, whitish, externally irrorated with grey. Antennae grey. Abdomen whitish, irrorated with grey. Legs grey-whitish. Forewings elongate, tolerably oblong, costa hardly arched, apex round-pointed, hindmargin straight, rather strongly oblique; greyish-fuscous, densely irrorated with white, and with a few black scales : cilia whitish-grey mixed with white, base white. Hindwings light fuscous-grey, towards hindmargin darker; cilia grey- whitish.

== Distribution ==
This species is endemic to New Zealand. It has been recorded in Taparewa near Nelson, the Mackenzie Basin, and Central Otago. It is possibly also present in Canterbury.

== Life cycle and behaviour ==
Adult moths have been recorded on wing in March. The species is attracted to light.

== Habitat ==
O. sophronellus is thought to occur in short tussock grasslands.

== Host species ==
O. sophronellus is associated with Carex muelleri.

== Conservation status ==
In 2025 this species was classified by the New Zealand Department of Conservation as "data deficient" under the New Zealand Threat Classification System.
