= Meadow brome =

Meadow brome may refer to:

- Bromus biebersteinii
- Bromus commutatus
- Bromus erectus
- Bromus riparius
