= Severn Ham =

Protected area in Gloucestershire, England

Severn Ham, Tewkesbury
- Site of Special Scientific Interest
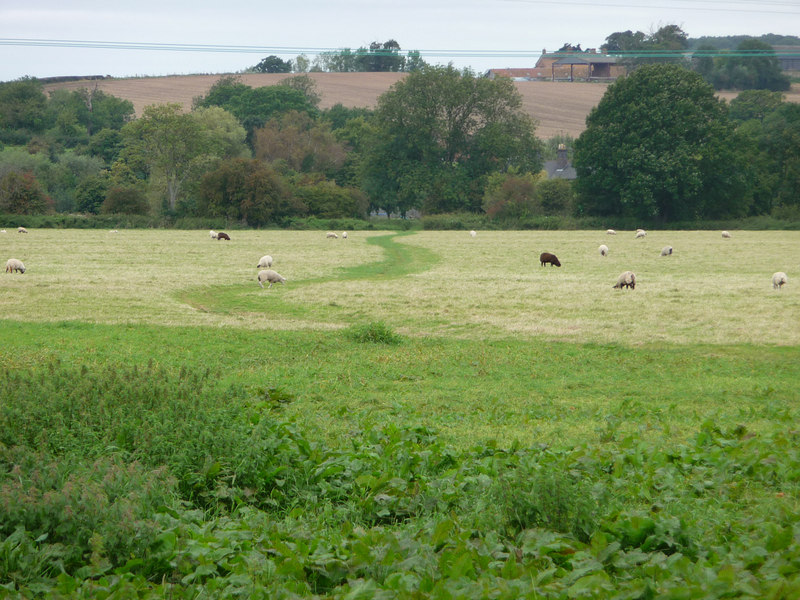
- Severn Ham
- Location of Severn Ham, Tewkesbury.
- Area of search: Gloucestershire
- Grid reference: SO885325
- Coordinates: 51.9925°N 2.1675°W
- Interest: Biological
- Area: 70.82 ha (175.0 acres)
- Notification date: 1974

Severn Ham, Tewkesbury (grid reference SO885325) is a 70.82-hectare (175.0-acre) biological Site of Special Scientific Interest in Gloucestershire near Tewkesbury, notified in 1974.

It is on the east side of the Severn to Old River Severn, Upper Lode SSSI.

== Habitat and flora ==
The site is important for protection being one of the few remaining ham meadows which are traditionally managed. It is sited on the alluvium of the Severn Vale and is a flooded area in the winter months. It is neutral grassland and mostly only semi-improved. There are specific requirements in respect of fertilisers for the site to ensure the protection of the wide-ranging flora. This includes the rare sulphurwort (Oenanthe silaifolia).

Grass species include cocksfoot, meadow foxtail, meadow barley, and smooth brome (Bromus racemosus). There is marsh foxtail in the wetter areas.

Flowering species such as meadow buttercup and lady's smock are plentiful. Trees and scrub grow on the margins.

== Fauna ==
Resident birds include lapwing, curlew and redshank.

== SSSI Source ==
- Natural England SSSI information on the citation
- Natural England SSSI information on the Severn Ham, Tewkesbury units
