= Blumeria americana =

Scientific classification
- Kingdom: Fungi
- Division: Ascomycota
- Class: Leotiomycetes
- Order: Helotiales
- Family: Erysiphaceae
- Genus: Blumeria
- Species: B. americana

Binomial name
- Blumeria americana M. Liu, 2021

Species of fungus

Blumeria americana is a species of powdery mildew in the family Erysiphaceae. It is found in North America where it infects multiple genera of plants in the family Poaceae (grasses), mainly in the tribe Triticeae, with one host in the Poeae.

== Description ==
The fungus forms thick mycelial growth on the leaves of its hosts, which soon becomes pigmented, greyish-orange or brownish-orange to rusty brown. The mycelium is formed from late spring or early summer to August. Secondary mycelium is said to be dingy greyish-white to grey. When present, the chasmothecia are often densely packed. As with most Erysiphaceae, Blumeria americana is fairly host-specific, having been most frequently recorded from Elymus, along with Leymus, Hordeum, Pascopyrum, Psathyrostachys, and Apera. However, many of these genera more commonly host other species of Blumeria (such as Hordeum with Blumeria hordei). The type host of Blumeria americana is Elymus repens – this species hosts Blumeria graminis in Eurasia (and potentially also in North America). Blumeria americana can be found only in North America, in any habitats where its host species can be found.

== Taxonomy ==
Blumeria americana was first described by Miao Liu in 2021. Prior to this, all powdery mildews on grass hosts were considered to belong to Blumeria graminis. The variation in this species had been long observed, and many formae and formae speciales were created throughout the twentieth century. B. americana was just one of seven new species described when Blumeria graminis was split up.

== Micromorphology ==
=== Description ===
The primary mycelium occurs in parallel with the secondary mycelium. It is effuse or typically in patches, at first white, becoming pigmented, greyish-orange or brownish-orange to rusty brown. The secondary mycelium is dense, appearing woolly to felt-like. It occurs on the leaf in patches, often around chasmothecia. It is coloured dingy greyish white to grey. The hyphal appressoria are described as nipple-, lobe-, or fork-shaped, occurring either singly or opposite in pairs. Conidia are broad and ellipsoid-ovoid. Secondary conidia can be lemon-shaped. Conidiophores are single or in pairs, with a swollen foot-cell characteristic of the genus. They can be branched or unbranched, with a basal septum at the junction with the mother cell or elevated up to 10 μm high. The chasmothecia (fruiting bodies) are semi-globose, with the upper surface depressed, later becoming concave. Chasmothecial appendages are simple and myceloid. The asci are typically oblong or ovoid with a wavy or branching stalk. Ascospores were not observed by M. Liu et al.

=== Measurements ===
Primary hyphal cells measure 27–42(–50) × 3–6(–8) μm. Hyphal appressoria are 4–5 μm wide or 4–7 μm for lobe or fork-shaped appressoria. Conidiophores are 220–260 μm long with foot cells measuring 25–53(–66) μm and varying between 10–15 μm wide in the middle and 5–7 μm wide at the basal septum. Primary conidia are (18–)20–31(–34) × 10–18 μm. Secondary conidia are 14–26(–29) × 8.5–14 μm. The chasmothecia are (110–)140–190(–220) μm in diameter when mature. Asci number 18–28 and are (69–)75–100(–104) × 32–45 μm.
