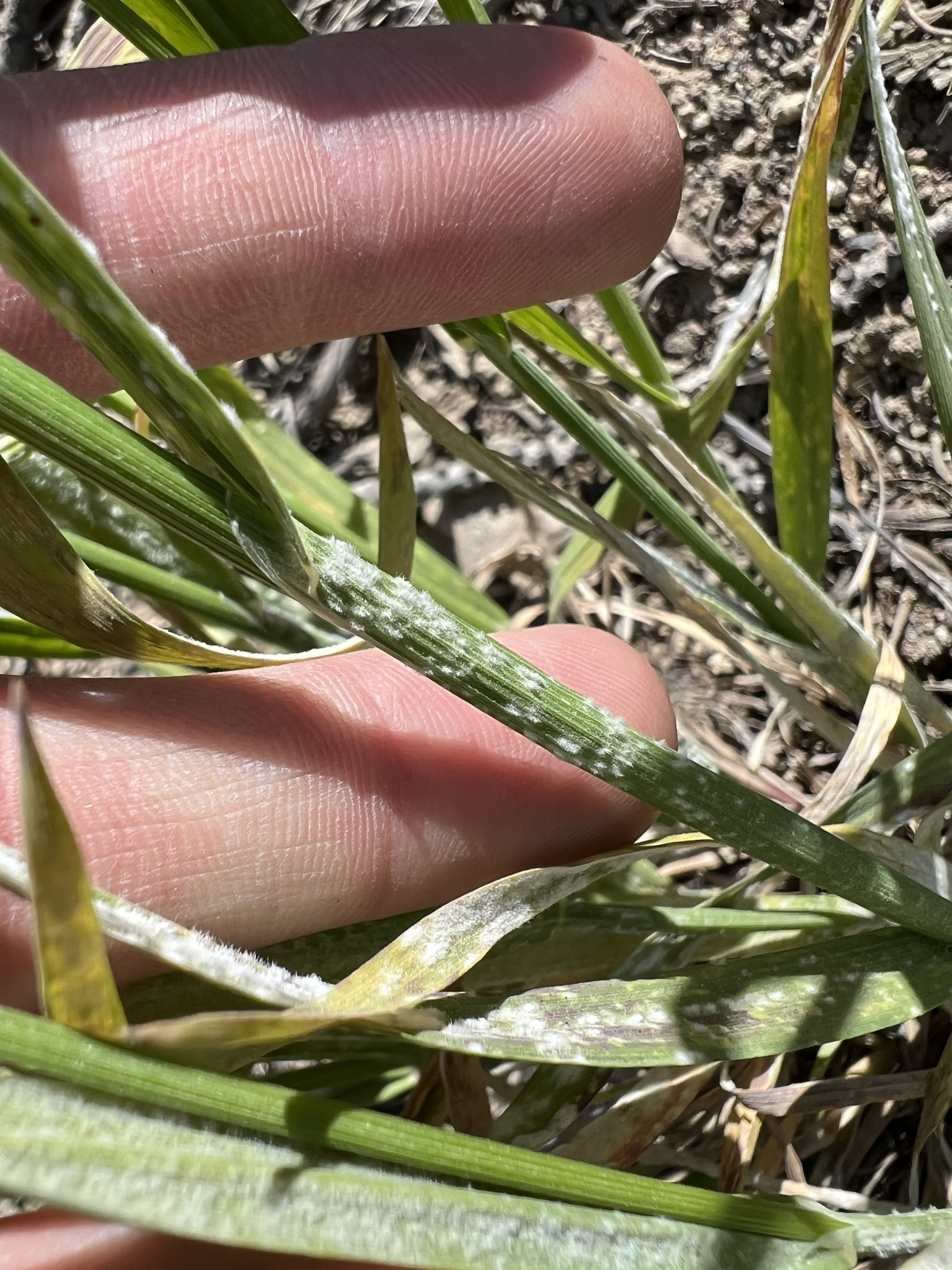
- Blumeria avenae on Avena in the US

Scientific classification
- Kingdom: Fungi
- Division: Ascomycota
- Class: Leotiomycetes
- Order: Helotiales
- Family: Erysiphaceae
- Genus: Blumeria
- Species: B. avenae

Binomial name
- Blumeria avenae M. Liu & Hambl., 2021

Synonyms
- Erysiphe graminis f.sp. avenae E. Marchal, 1902

= Blumeria avenae =

Species of fungus

Blumeria avenae is a species of powdery mildew in the family Erysiphaceae. It is found across the world on every continent bar Antarctica, where it infects plants in the genus Avena (oats).

== Description ==
The fungus forms thick white mycelial growth on the leaves of its hosts, which sometimes becomes faintly pigmented with age. The mycelium is formed from spring until autumn or even winter. Secondary mycelium is said to be dingy greyish-white to grey. When present, the chasmothecia are often densely packed. As with most Erysiphaceae, Blumeria avenae is highly host-specific, only occurring on Avena species. Other genera of grasses host other Blumeria species, many of which are likely undescribed. Blumeria avenae can be found worldwide, wherever its host species are found.

Blumeria avenae affects a commercially vital crop, and is said to be one of the main factors reducing oat yield quality and quantity. Consequently, much work has been done to investigate potential resistance and controls for the fungus. Most conventional treatments involve the application of fungicides, but work has been done to investigate breeding infection-resistant varieties of oats.

== Taxonomy ==
Blumeria avenae was first described by E. Marchal in 1902 as Erysiphe graminis f.sp. avenae, although formae speciales have no standing in the Code. M. Liu and Hambleton described the species Blumeria avenae in 2021 during a taxonomic review of Blumeria. Prior to this, all powdery mildews on grass hosts were considered to belong to Blumeria graminis. The variation in this species had been long observed, and many formae and formae speciales were created throughout the twentieth century. B. avenae was just one of seven new species described when Blumeria graminis was split up. The type specimen was collected in England. The specific epithet refers to its host genus.

== Micromorphology ==
=== Description ===
The primary mycelium is effuse or typically in patches, at first whitish, later pigmented. The secondary mycelium is dense, appearing woolly to felt-like. It occurs on the leaf in patches, often around chasmothecia. It is coloured dingy greyish white to grey sometimes becoming pigmented with age. The hyphal appressoria are described as nipple-shaped, occurring either singly or opposite in pairs. Conidia are broad and ellipsoid-ovoid and occasionally lemon-shaped. Conidiophores are usually near or next to one septum, and are erect, single or in pairs, with a swollen foot-cell characteristic of the genus. Chasmothecial appendages and ascospores were not recorded by M. Liu et al.

=== Measurements ===
Primary hyphal cells are 2–8 μm wide. Secondary hyphal cells are 3–6.5 μm wide. Hyphal appressoria are 3–6 μm wide. Conidiophores are 60–150 × (4–)5–7(–8) μm long with foot cells measuring (25–)30–45 × 5–6 μm and varying between 10–14 μm wide at the swelling and (4–)5–7(–10) μm wide at the basal septum. Conidia are 24–38.5(–44) × 11–19 μm. The chasmothecia are 160–200 μm in diameter when mature.
