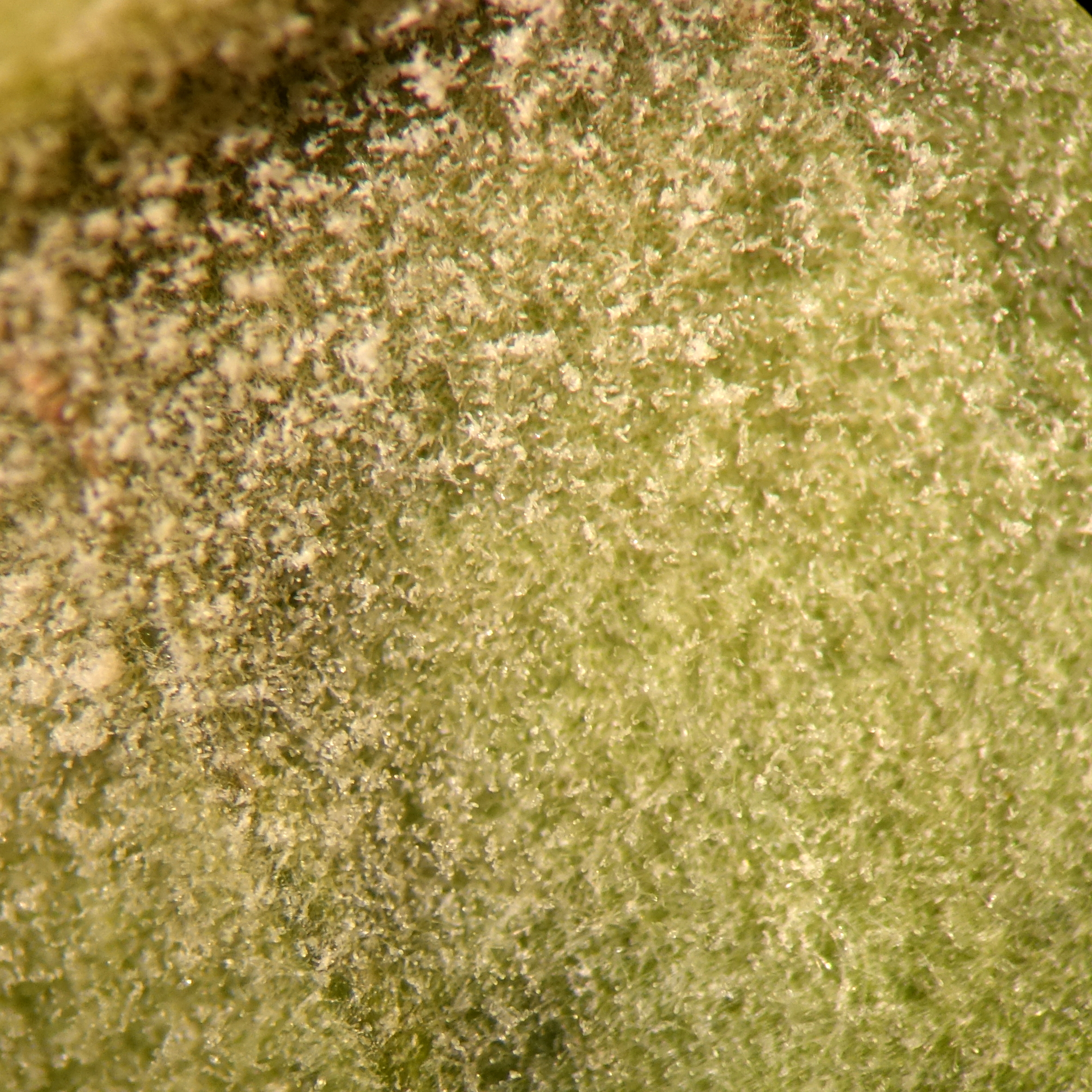

Scientific classification
- Kingdom: Fungi
- Division: Ascomycota
- Class: Leotiomycetes
- Order: Helotiales
- Family: Erysiphaceae
- Genus: Oidium
- Species: O. caricae-papayae

Binomial name
- Oidium caricae-papayae J.M. Yen, (1966)

Synonyms
- Acrosporium caricae (F. Noack) Subram., (1971); Oidium caricae F. Noack, (1898)

= Oidium caricae-papayae =

Species of fungus

Oidium caricae-papayae is a plant pathogen.
