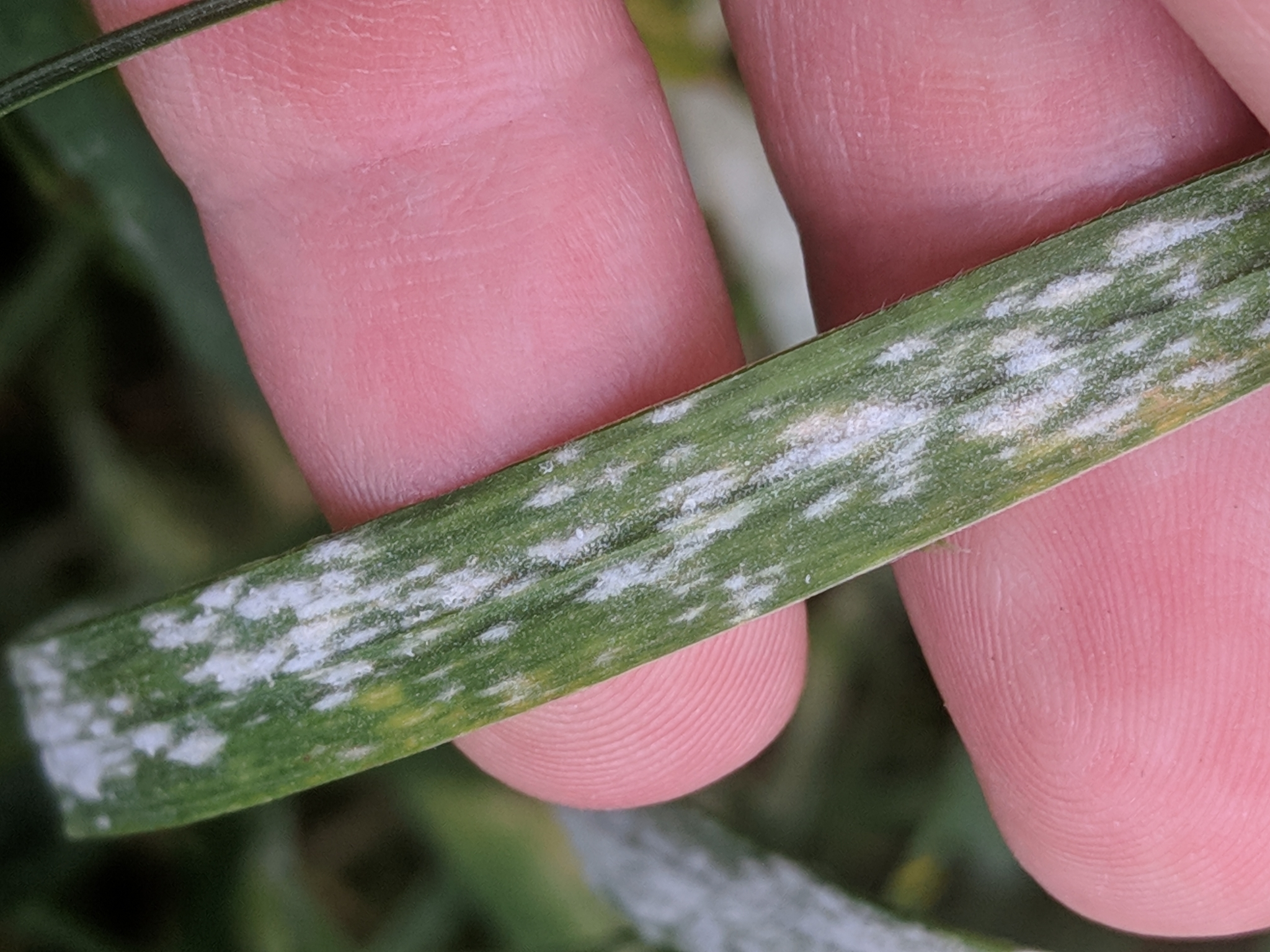
- Blumeria bromi-cathartici on Bromus catharticus

Scientific classification
- Kingdom: Fungi
- Division: Ascomycota
- Class: Leotiomycetes
- Order: Helotiales
- Family: Erysiphaceae
- Genus: Blumeria
- Species: B. bromi-cathartici

Binomial name
- Blumeria bromi-cathartici S. Takam. & M. Liu, 2021

= Blumeria bromi-cathartici =

Species of fungus

Blumeria bromi-cathartici is a species of powdery mildew in the family Erysiphaceae. It is found worldwide, where it infects Bromus catharticus (rescue brome).

== Description ==
The fungus forms thick white mycelial growth on the leaves of its hosts, which remains white with age. As with most Erysiphaceae, Blumeria bromi-cathartici is highly host-specific, only being known from a single species, Bromus catharticus. Another species of powdery mildew, Blumeria bulbigera, can be found on other species of Bromus. Other genera of grasses host other Blumeria species, many of which are likely undescribed. Blumeria bromi-cathartici can be found worldwide, wherever its host species are found, although it has yet to be observed in Australia or New Zealand.

== Taxonomy ==
Blumeria bromi-cathartici was first described by Susumu Takamatsu and Miao Liu in 2021 during a taxonomic review of Blumeria. Prior to this, all powdery mildews on grass hosts were considered to belong to Blumeria graminis. The variation in this species had been long observed, and many formae and formae speciales were created throughout the twentieth century. B. bromi-cathartici was just one of seven new species described when Blumeria graminis was split up. The type specimen was collected in Japan. The specific epithet refers to its host species.

== Micromorphology ==
=== Description ===
The primary mycelium is in thick patches, remaining whitish, or becoming slightly pigmented yellowish. The hyphal appressoria are described as nipple-shaped, occurring singly. Conidiophores are usually near or next to one septum, and are erect, single or in pairs, with a swollen foot-cell characteristic of the genus. Conidiophores form catenate conidia. Conidia are oblong and occasionally lemon-shaped. Chasmothecia including appendages and ascospores were not observed by M. Liu et al.

=== Measurements ===
Primary hyphal cells are 4–6(–7) μm wide. Conidiophores are up to 119 μm long with foot cells measuring (27–)30–50(–60) μm long and varying between 9.5–12.5 μm wide at the swelling and 4.7–7.7 μm wide at the basal septum. Conidia are 28–43 × 12–17.5 μm.
