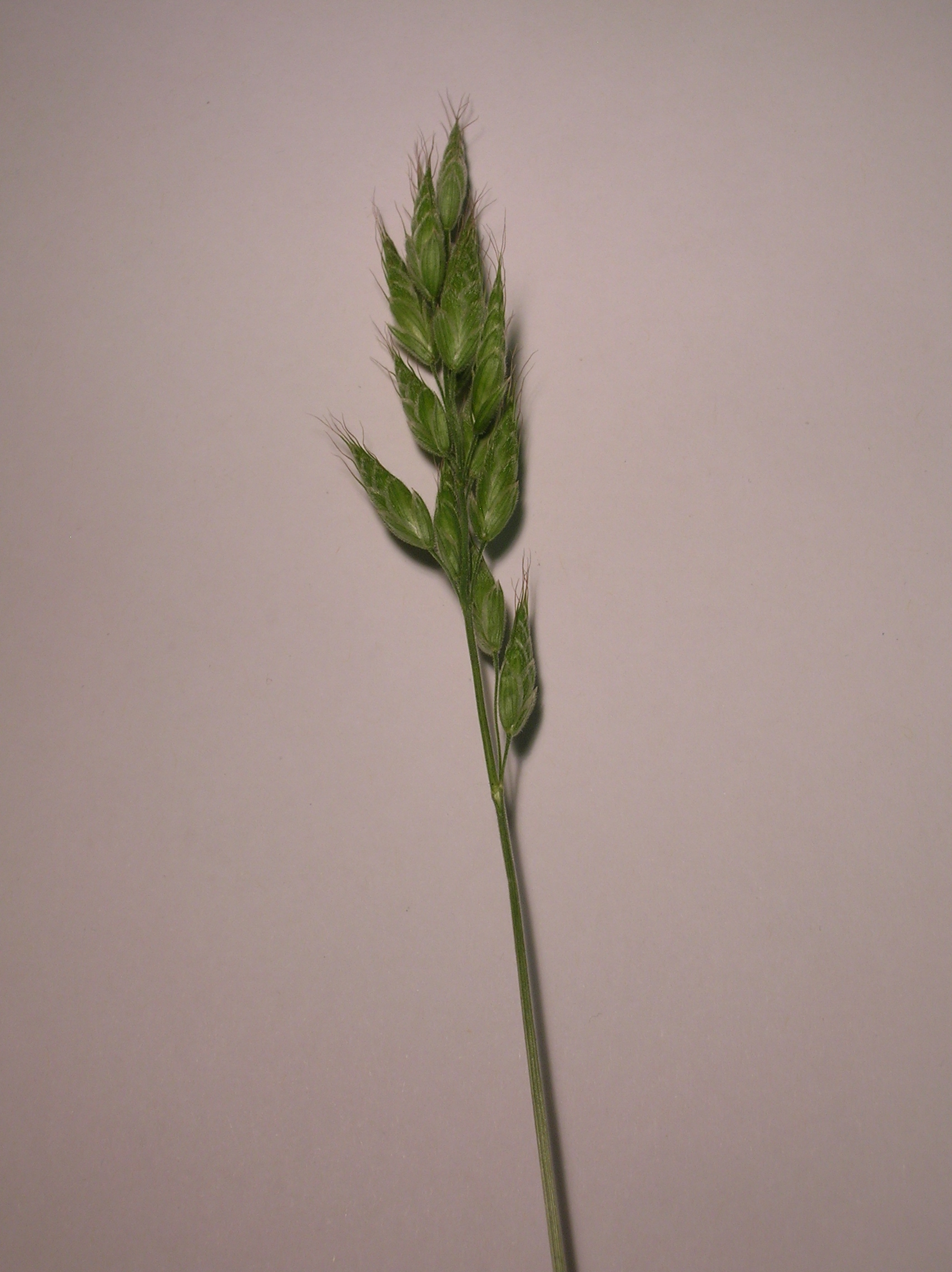
A panicle of Bromus commutatus Bromus hordeaceus!

Scientific classification
- Kingdom: Plantae
- Clade: Tracheophytes
- Clade: Angiosperms
- Clade: Monocots
- Clade: Commelinids
- Order: Poales
- Family: Poaceae
- Subfamily: Pooideae
- Genus: Bromus
- Species: B. commutatus

Binomial name
- Bromus commutatus Schrad.

Synonyms
- Brachypodium commutatum (Schrad.) P. Beauv.; Bromus commutatus var. apricorum Simonkai; Bromus hordeaceus var. commutatus (Schrad.) Fiori; Bromus mollis var. commutatus (Schrad.) Sanio; Bromus mutabilis var. commutatus (Schrad.) F. W. Schultz; Bromus racemosus var. commutatus (Schrad.) Maire & Weiller; Bromus racemosus var. commutatus (Schrad.) Coss. & T. Durand; Bromus secalinus commutatus (Schrad.) Lloret; Forasaccus commutatus (Schrad.) Bubani; Serrafalcus commutatus (Schrad.) Bab.; Serrafalcus racemosus (L.) Parl. Commutatus (Schrad.) Rouy

= Bromus commutatus =

Species of grass

Bromus commutatus, the meadow brome, is an annual or biennial species of plant in the grass family Poaceae. In the United States it is known as hairy chess.

== Description ==
The height ranges from 40 to 120 cm (47 in). The panicle is 7–20 cm, usually nodding and often spreading, but erect as first. The leaf-sheaths are hairy, the upper are usually hairless. B. commutatus is stouter than B. racemosus, the smooth brome, with a flower-head not drooping to one side and a broader elongated branched flower head.

== Meadow brome structure ==
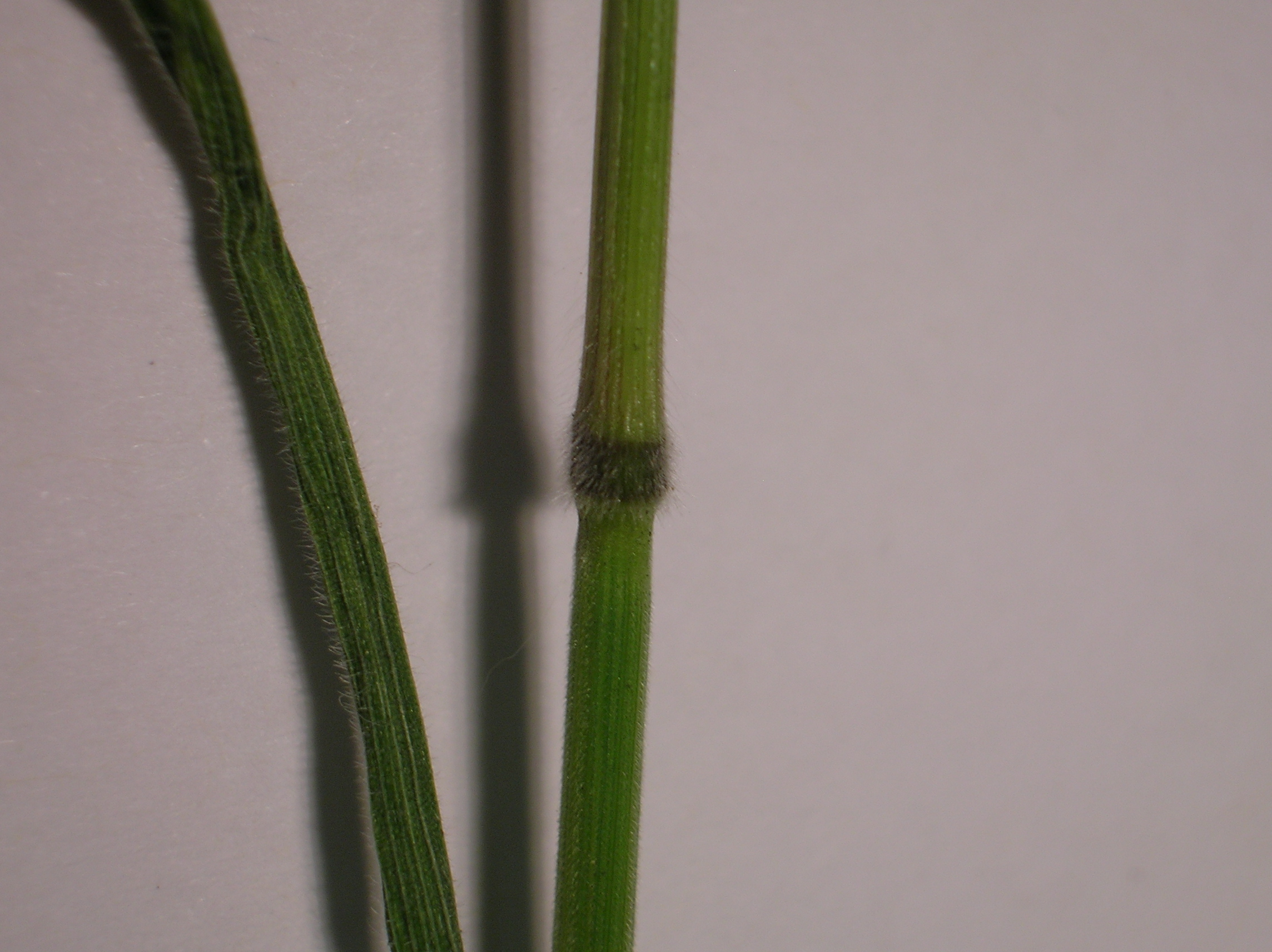
Node structure

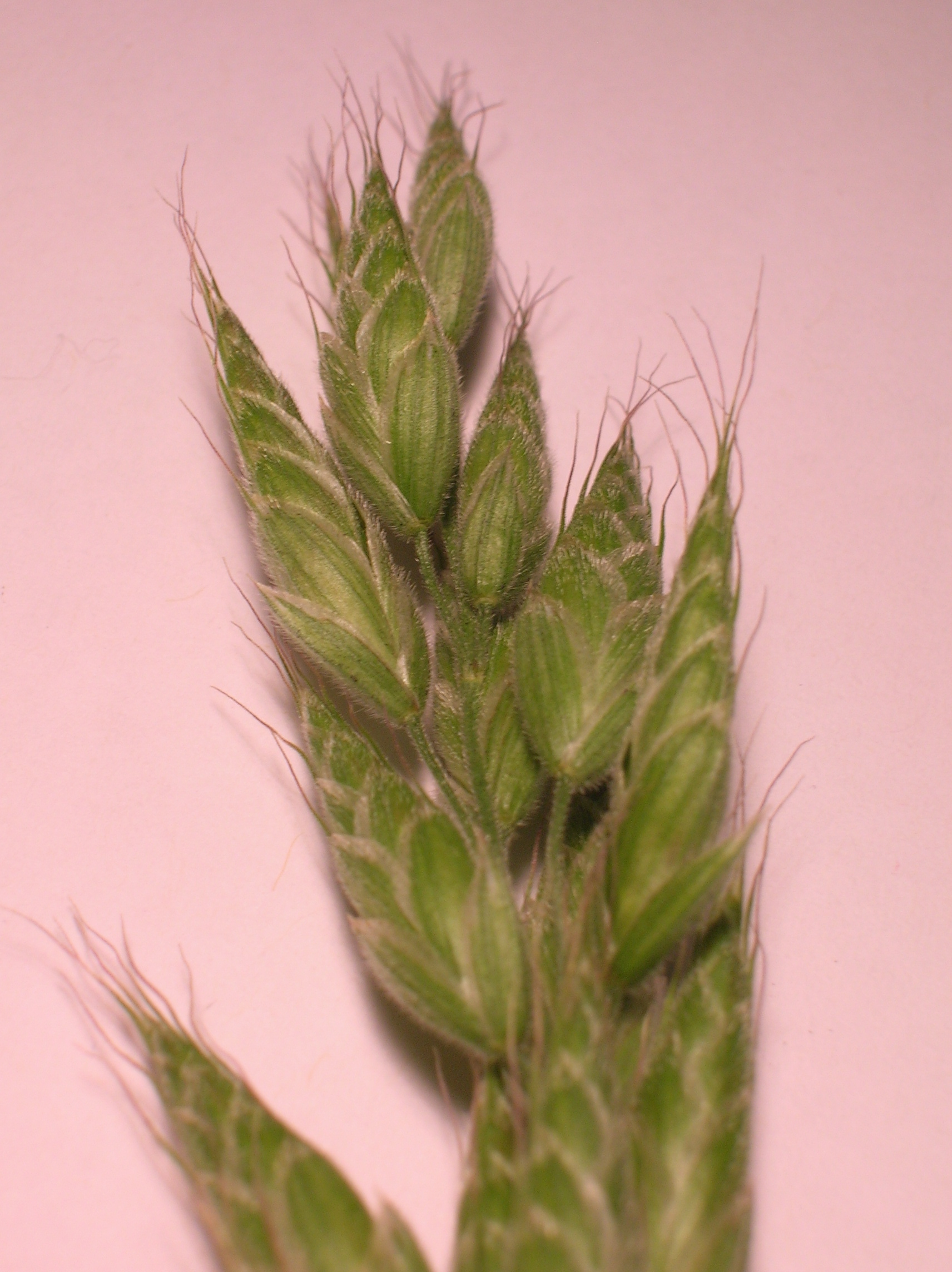
Panicle detail

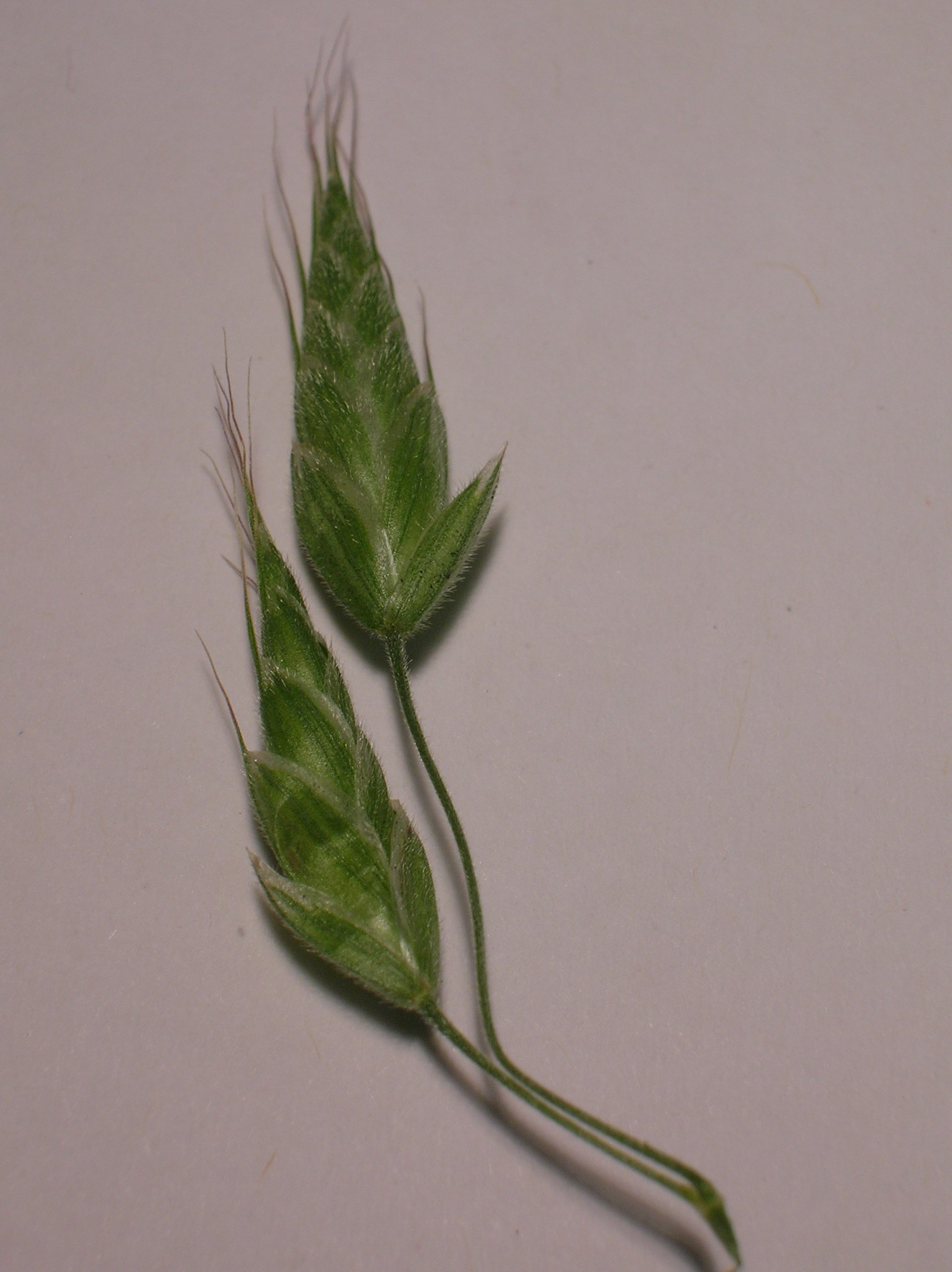
Spikelets detail

== Habitat and distribution ==
It is found in meadows, wasteground, road verges, hayfields and rough grassland. Found throughout the United Kingdom, it is common in England on the moist soils of water meadows; it is rare in Scotland, Ireland and Wales. It is found naturally throughout Europe, N. Africa, W. Asia. It has been introduced into North America and in the United States is known as 'Hairy Chess'. The flowering period is from May to July.

== Crop value ==
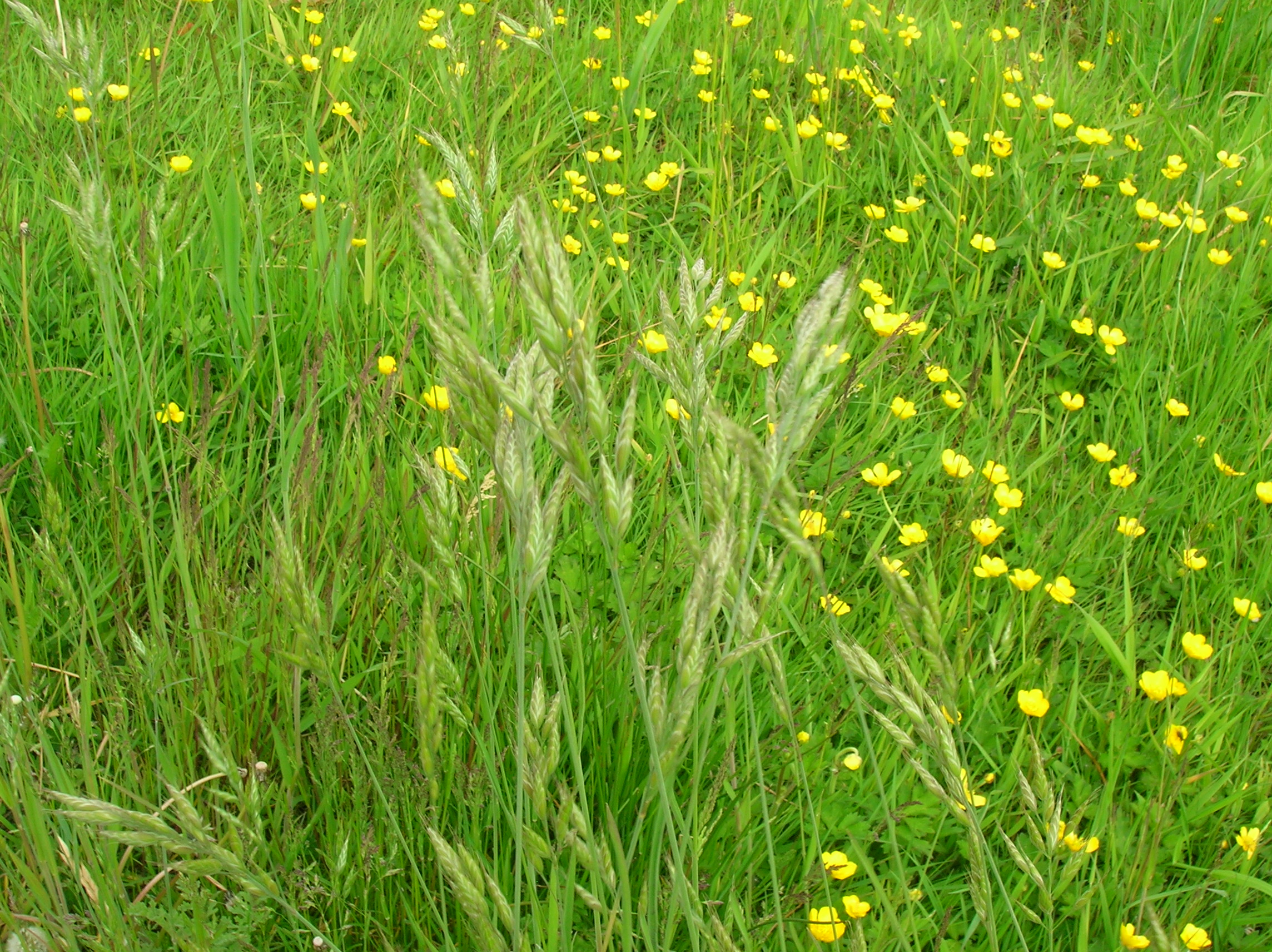
Meadow brome in a typical habitat

The species has no fodder value in the United Kingdom and is regarded as a weed. The attractive inflorescences may be used, either fresh or dry, in flower arrangements.

== Varieties ==
Bromus commutatus var. pubens Wats has spikelets which are not hairless, having soft hairs.
