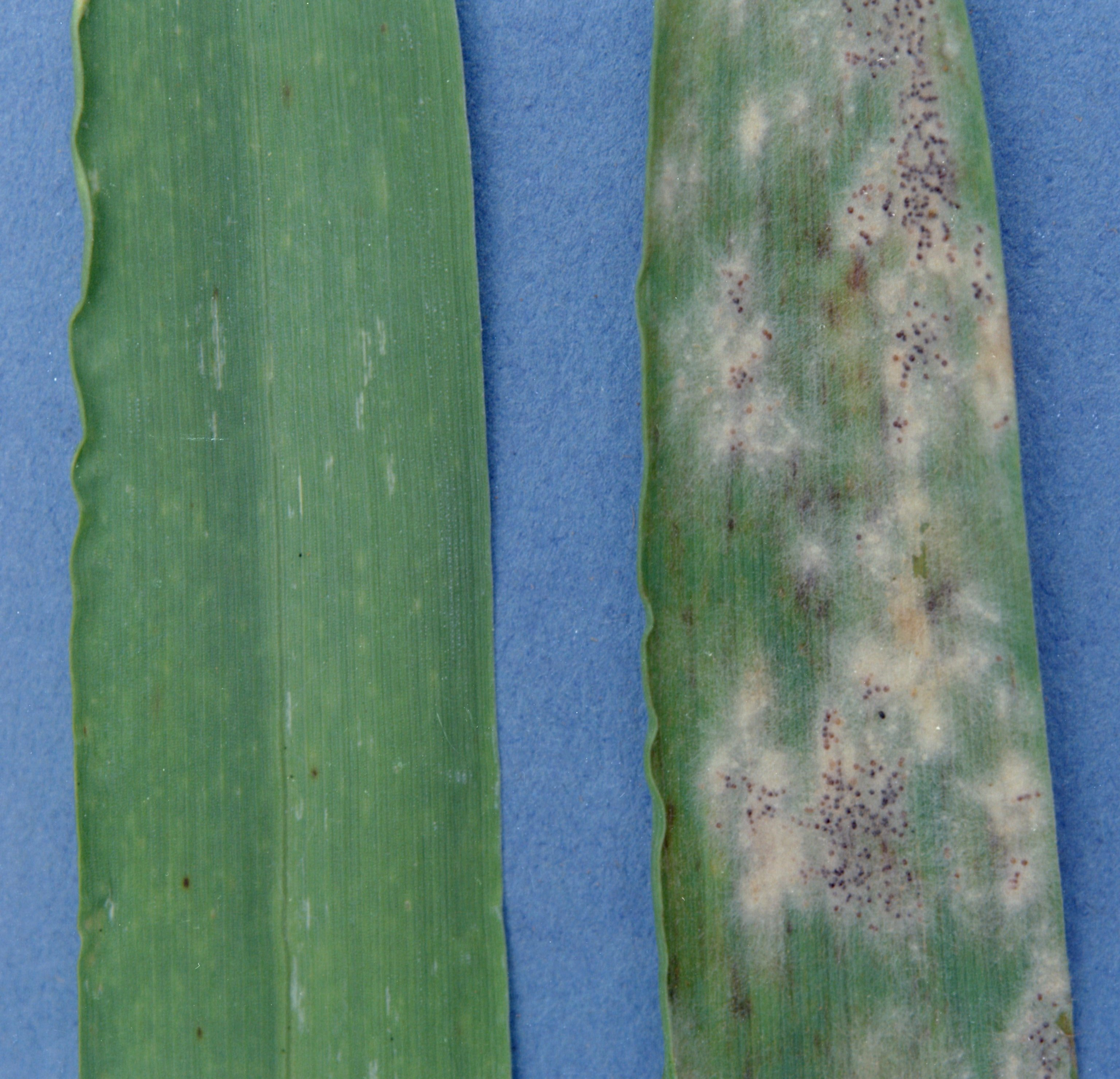
- A Blumeria species on a barley leaf

Scientific classification
- Kingdom: Fungi
- Division: Ascomycota
- Class: Leotiomycetes
- Order: Helotiales
- Family: Erysiphaceae
- Genus: Blumeria; Golovin ex Speer, 1975

Type species
- Blumeria graminis (DC.) Speer, 1975

Synonyms
- Oidium Link, 1824

= Blumeria =

Genus of fungi

Blumeria is a genus of plant pathogenic fungi in the family Erysiphaceae (powdery mildews). Members of the genus are found on all continents bar Antarctica and infect members of the Poaceae (grasses).

== Description ==
Blumeria species form thick mycelial growth on the leaves of their hosts. Depending on the species and the stage of infection, the mycelium can be white, grey, tan or brown. When present, the chasmothecia are often densely packed. Some species infect staple crops such as wheat and barley, and these have been the subject of numerous genomic and resistance analyses in order to determine a way of ensuring crop resistance to the powdery mildew.

== Taxonomy ==
Blumeria was once considered to be a monotypic genus, comprising the sole species Blumeria graminis (formerly known as Erysiphe graminis and with the anamorph Oidium monilinoides). The genus Blumeria was illegitimately erected by Golovin in 1958 and correctly by Speer in 1975. The genus currently contains eight species, with likely more yet to be described.

The type species of the former anamorph genus Oidium was O. monilinoides, which happened to be the anamorph of Blumeria graminis. With the 'one fungus, one name' change to the Code in 2012, anamorph genera were no longer accepted, meaning Oidium became a synonym of Blumeria. However, most species of Oidium are not taxonomically synonymous with Blumeria.

== Species ==
The genus comprises the following species:

- Blumeria americana M. Liu, 2021
- Blumeria avenae M. Liu & Hambl., 2021
- Blumeria bromi-cathartici S. Takam. & M. Liu, 2021
- Blumeria bulbigera (Bonord.) M. Liu & U. Braun, 2021
- Blumeria dactylidis M. Liu & Hambl., 2021
- Blumeria graminicola M. Liu & Hambl., 2021
- Blumeria graminis (DC.) Speer, 1975
- Blumeria hordei M. Liu & Hambl., 2021
