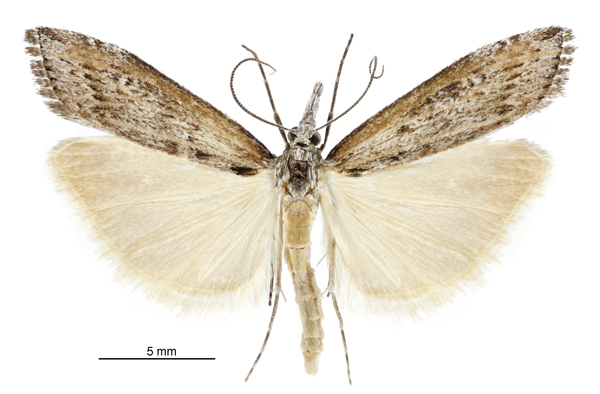
- Male

Scientific classification
- Kingdom: Animalia
- Phylum: Arthropoda
- Clade: Pancrustacea
- Class: Insecta
- Order: Lepidoptera
- Family: Crambidae
- Subfamily: Crambinae
- Tribe: Crambini
- Genus: Orocrambus
- Species: O. cyclopicus

Binomial name
- Orocrambus cyclopicus (Meyrick, 1883)

Synonyms
- Crambus cyclopicus Meyrick, 1883; Crambus sophistes Meyrick, 1905

= Orocrambus cyclopicus =

Species of moth

Orocrambus cyclopicus is a moth in the family Crambidae. It was described by Edward Meyrick in 1883. In 1975 David E. Gaskin wrongly synonymised Crambus sophistes with Orocrambus cyclopicus.

It is endemic to New Zealand. This species has been recorded from the eastern South Island and the southern part of the North Island. The habitat consists of lowland to alpine grasslands.

The wingspan is 22–30 mm. Adults have been recorded on wing from January to May.

The larvae feed on Bromus hordeaceus and Arrhenatherum elatius.
