= Old River Severn, Upper Lode =

Former meander of River Severn in Gloucestershire, England

- Site of Special Scientific Interest
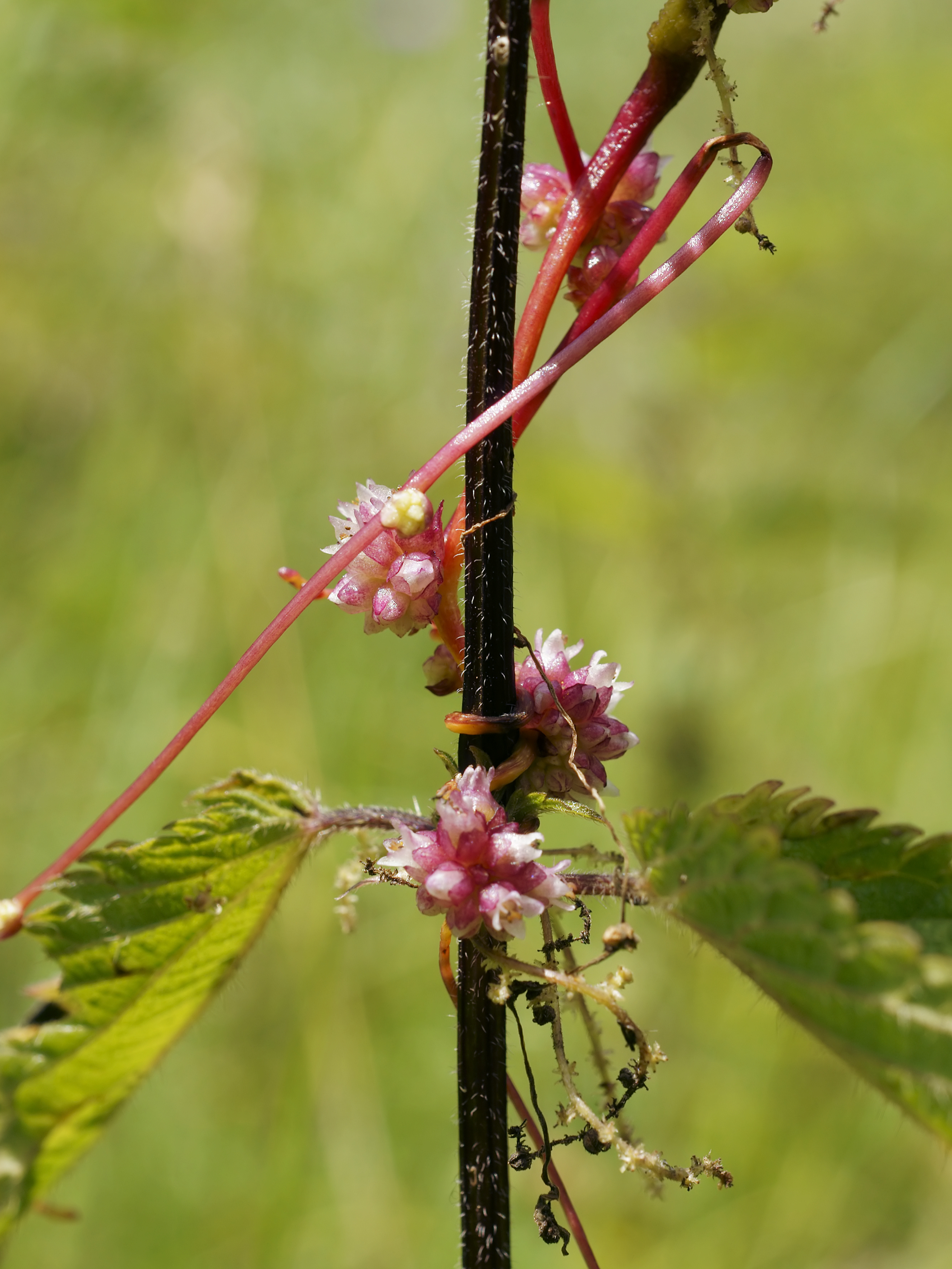
- Greater dodder on nettle

- Location within Gloucestershire
- Location of Old River Severn, Upper Lode.
- Area of search: Gloucestershire
- Grid reference: SO880331
- Coordinates: 51.996664°N 2.175462°W
- Interest: Biological
- Area: 3.72 ha (9.2 acres)
- Notification date: 1985

Old River Severn, Upper Lode (grid reference SO880331) is a 3.72-hectare (9.2-acre) biological Site of Special Scientific Interest in Gloucestershire, notified in 1985. It is a cross county border site between Gloucestershire and Herefordshire and Worcestershire.

It is on the west side of the Severn to Severn Ham, Tewkesbury SSSI.

== Location ==
The Severn at this site is an old meander which was cut off from the main flow of the river when Upper Lode lock was built. It is a relatively quiet backwater that joins the Severn at the south end.

== Habitat and flora ==
The meander now supports a diverse range of habitats as a result of the seclusion. These in turn support a variety of plant life and there are at least six nationally rare species. The channel has silted up at the furthest part from the main river. Where spoil has been dumped historically in the channel the area has become rough grassland.

Habitats are open water, marginal mud, inland saltmarsh, willow carr, neutral grassland, scrub and woodland. The main river controls the level of the water which fluctuates as the Severn is a tidal river.

Aquartic plants supported are pondweed, flowering rush, water forget-me-not, water-cress and water dock. There is white willow, crack willow and osier. In the area of rough grassland the nationally rare swamp meadow grass may be found. Woodland trees include alder and ash as well as willow.

Nationally rare species supported include greater dodder which parasitises nettle. There is also tasteless water-pepper, small water pepper, mudwort and needle spike rush. This is the only known site in Gloucestershire for small water pepper, mudwort and needle spike rush. Narrow-leaved water plantain, keeled garlic (Allium carinatus), glaucous bulrush (Schoenoplectus tabernaemontani) and sea club rush (Scirpus maritimus) are also recorded.

== Fauna ==
Birds include mallard, coot, reed warbler and sedge warbler. Kingfisher are present and waders are reported such as redshank, common sandpiper and lapwing. Dragonflies are present including the relatively scarce migrant hawker and white-legged damselfly.

== SSSI Source ==
- Natural England SSSI information on the citation
- Natural England SSSI information on the Old River Severn, Upper Lode units
