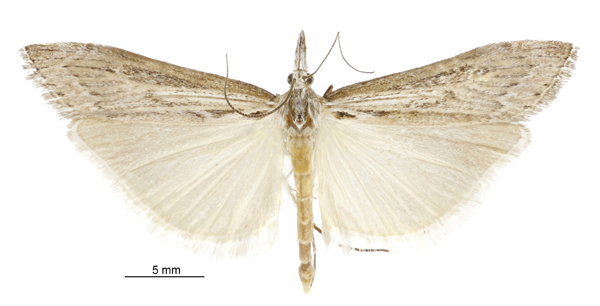
- Male

Conservation status
- Nationally Vulnerable (NZ TCS)

Scientific classification
- Kingdom: Animalia
- Phylum: Arthropoda
- Clade: Pancrustacea
- Class: Insecta
- Order: Lepidoptera
- Family: Crambidae
- Genus: Orocrambus
- Species: O. sophistes

Binomial name
- Orocrambus sophistes (Meyrick, 1905)

Synonyms
- Crambus sophistes Meyrick, 1905

= Orocrambus sophistes =

Species of moth

Orocrambus sophistes is a moth in the family Crambidae. This species is endemic to New Zealand and has been observed in South Island at the Mackenzie Basin, Central Otago and Otago Lakes areas. This moth is a dryland specialist and inhabits short tussock grasslands. The larval host species is Festuca novae-zelandiae. The adults of this species have been observed from mid January to April with the female being flightless. The adult male is attracted to light. This species has been classified as Nationally Vulnerable by the Department of Conservation.

== Taxonomy ==
This species was first described by Edward Meyrick in 1905 using a specimen collected by J. H. Lewis in Ida Valley, Otago. Meyrick named the species Crambus sophistes. In 1928, George Vernon Hudson also described and illustrated Crambus sophistes. In 1975, David E. Gaskin wrongly synonymised this species with Orocrambus cyclopicus. However, its transfer into the genus Orocrambus has been accepted. The type specimen is held at the Natural History Museum, London.

== Description ==
Meyrick described the male of the species as follows:

♂︎. 17 mm. Head, palpi, and thorax fuscous, suffusedly mixed with whitish; palpi 5. Antennae dark grey. Abdomen whitish, basal half brassy. Fore-wings very elongate, narrow, gradually dilated, costa gently arched, apex somewhat acute, termen rounded, rather strongly oblique; fuscous, irregularly irrorated with grey-whitish; a short suffused dark fuscous mark along dorsum towards base; a slender white streak, edged with scattered dark fuscous scales, along fold from base to middle, thence acutely angulated inwards to near dorsum, this portion edged posteriorly with some dark fuscous suffusion; two dark fuscous dots longitudinally placed in disc about 2/3; two sub-terminal series of short blackish dashes on veins, and a third less complete on termen : cilia whitish, with two interrupted fuscous lines. Hind-wings fuscous-whitish; cilia ochreous-white.

The female of the species is flightless. Although this species resembles other endemic species in its genus, it can be distinguished by labial palps. It can be distinguished from O. cyclopicus as it is larger in size and its female is short winged.

== Distribution ==
This species is endemic to New Zealand. The range of this species is the Mackenzie Basin, Central Otago and Otago Lakes. O. sophistes is possibly extinct in its type locality. This species has been collected at Devils Elbow at Coronet Peak.

== Life cycle and behaviour ==
Adults have been observed from mid-January to April. The male of the species is attracted to light.

== Habitat ==
O. sophistes is a dryland specialist and occurs in short tussock grasslands where its host plant is a common component.

== Host species ==
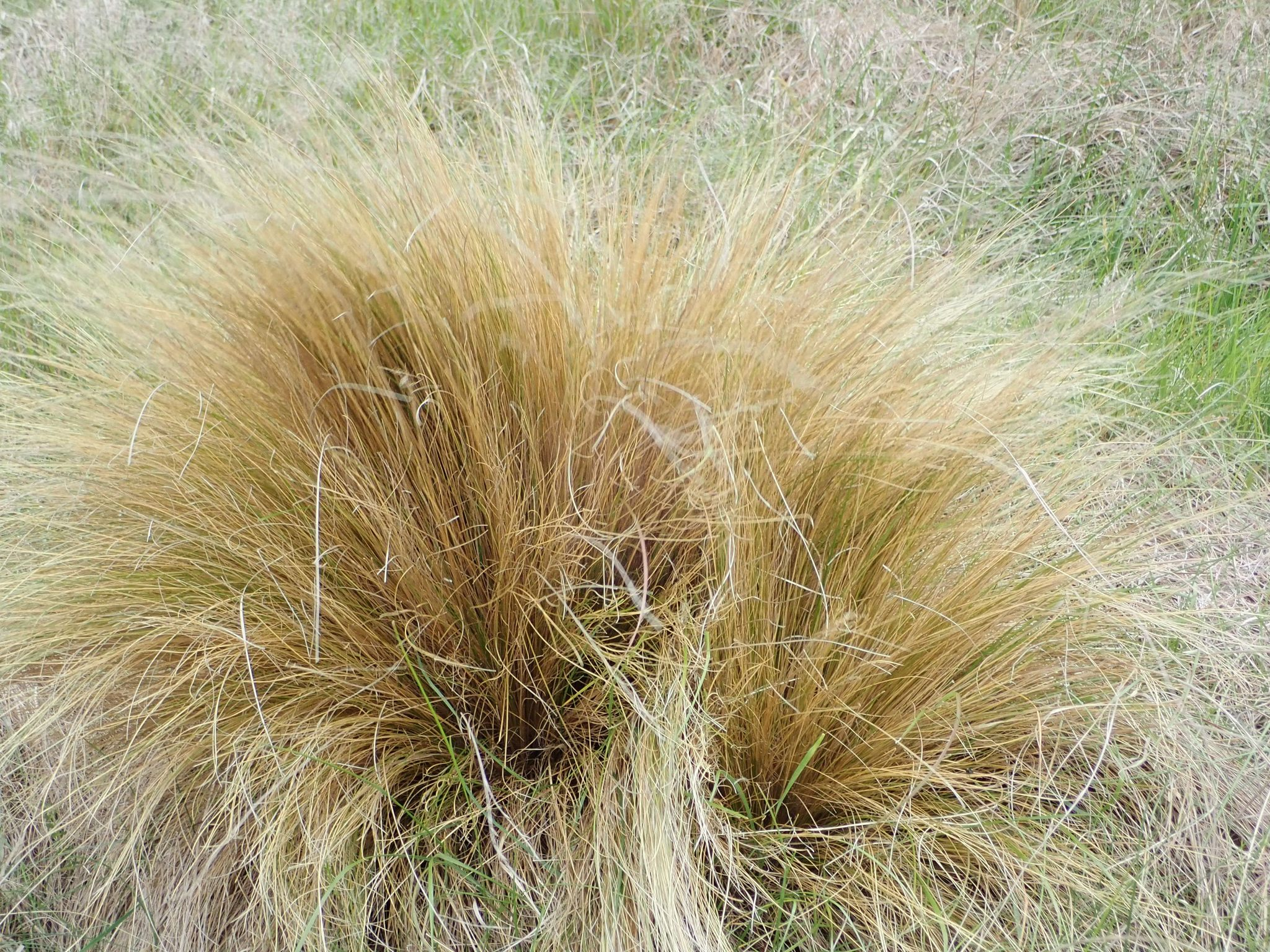
Festuca novae-zelandiae, host plant of O. sophistes.

O. sophistes is associated with the endemic grass Festuca novae-zelandiae.

== Conservation status ==
This moth is classified under the New Zealand Threat Classification system as being Nationally Vulnerable. The reduction in the range of this species aligns with the contraction of range of its endemic host along with the fact that, as a result of the flightlessness of the female, this species has a limited ability to disburse.

A proposed expansion of gold mining by OceanaGold at Macraes Flat, Central Otago, threatened O. sophistes population in Golden Bar, an open pit and one of three potential mine sites 55 km north of Dunedin. This led to objections by the Department of Conservation, three local rūnanga, and Forest & Bird; the latter cited "significant adverse effects on indigenous vegetation, fauna habitat, wetlands and freshwater ecosystems" if the area was mined, and in particular threats to this species. OceanaGold had previously proposed establishing the moth's host plant at a nearby site and recreating its habitat, but in May 2025, in response to criticism of this plan, they reserved the right not to proceed with mining at Golder Bar pending an environmental impact assessment.
