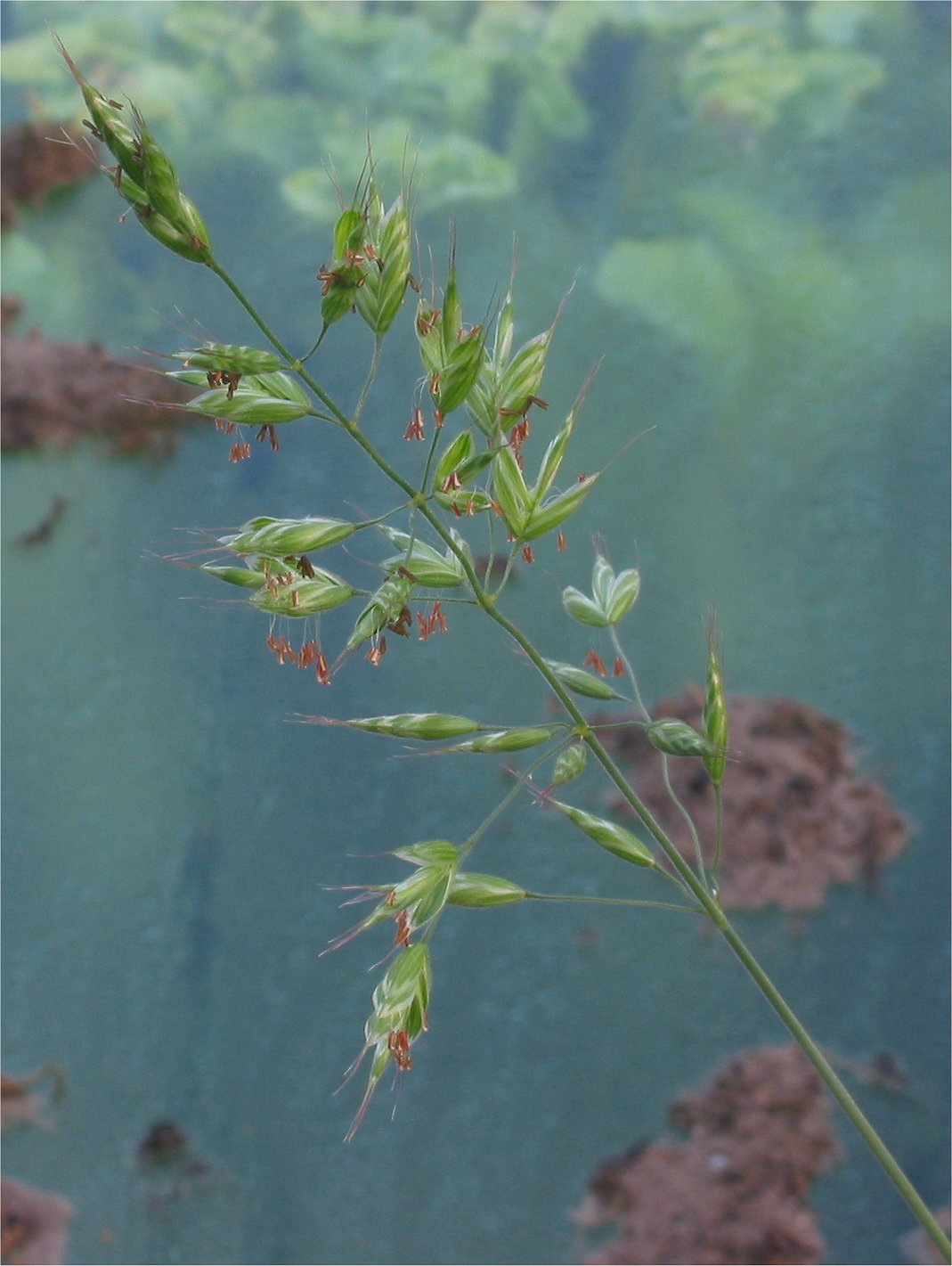

Scientific classification
- Kingdom: Plantae
- Clade: Tracheophytes
- Clade: Angiosperms
- Clade: Monocots
- Clade: Commelinids
- Order: Poales
- Family: Poaceae
- Subfamily: Pooideae
- Genus: Bromus
- Species: B. hordeaceus

Binomial name
- Bromus hordeaceus L.

Synonyms
- Bromus mollis L.

= Bromus hordeaceus =

Species of grass

Bromus hordeaceus, the soft brome, is an annual or biennial species of grass in the grass family (Poaceae). It is also known in North America as bull grass, soft cheat, and soft chess.

It is the most common species of Bromus in Britain, where it can be found on roadsides, waste ground, meadows, and cultivated land. It is found throughout Europe and western Asia, and was introduced into North and South America and Australia.

== Taxonomy ==
Previously known as B. mollis, this species belongs to a group of closely related species, including some hybrids, which are difficult to tell apart. Some of the other species in this group include: B. thominii, B. lepidus, B. ferronii, and B. molliformis.

== Description ==
The plant is pubescent entirely and lacks rhizomes. It can grow 7–110 cm (3–43 in) high, sometimes in tufts, sometimes singly.

The smooth, yellowish brown culms measure 0.5–5 mm (0.02–0.20 in) wide at their base, and are minutely to densely pubescent, with hairs measuring up to 0.6 mm (0.02 in) long. The moderately to densely pilose leaf sheaths are mostly closed, with hairs 1.2 mm (0.047 in) long. The plant lacks auricles. The membraneous and erose ligules are 1–2.6 mm (0.04–0.10 in) long and are glabrous or pubescent. The grey-green leaf blades are 2.2–18 cm (0.9–7.1 in) long and 1–5.3 mm (0.04–0.21 in) wide, with a pubescent adaxial surface and an abaxial surface pubescent with hairs about one quarter the length of those on the adaxial surface. The leaf margins are smooth or serrated.

The grey-green to purple panicles are 2.5–14 cm (1.0–5.5 in) long and 1–4 cm (0.39–1.57 in) wide. The panicles can be dense or reduced to just one spikelet. The erect to ascending or lax branches of the panicle are scabrous or pubescent, each branch bearing one spikelet.

The ovate-lanceolate spikelets are 1.7–3 cm (0.67–1.18 in), including the awns 3–8 mm (0.12–0.31 in) long. The rachillae can be visible when the spikelet is mature and the spikelet has six to eleven florets. The subequal glumes are minutely to densely pubescent and the keels are serrated. The lower glumes are 5.2–7 mm (0.20–0.28 in) long with three to five nerved, and the upper glumes are 6–8.5 mm (0.24–0.33 in) long and seven- to nine-nerved. The lemmas are 7.5–9 mm (0.3–0.4 in) long and 1.9–2.5 mm (0.07–0.10 in) wide, with seven to nine visible, conspicuous nerves. The lemmas have hyaline margins 0.3–0.6 mm (0.012–0.024 in) broad. The apex is bifid and the cleft is 0.3–0.7 mm (0.012–0.028 in) deep. The awns are 4–7.6 mm (0.16–0.30 in) long, arising 0.4–1.2 mm (0.016–0.047 in) below the lemma. The paleas are shorter than the lemmas, with glabrous backs and ciliate keels. The dark brown anthers are 0.3–1.3 mm (0.012–0.051 in) long.

It grows during winter and flowers from late spring onwards, maturing in the summer. The grass blooms in May and August.

Bromus hordeaceus is closely related to and difficult to distinguish from Bromus racemosus. The only obvious distinguishing characteristic is the level of lemma nerve protrusion; the lemma nerves are raised and conspicuous in B. hordeaceus while they are smooth and obscure in B. racemosus.

== Distribution and habitat ==
Bromus hordeaceus is native to the Mediterranean basin, and is now widely distributed across North America, Europe, Africa, and Australia. It grows in waste areas, road verges, fields, grassy plains, and sandy beaches. The grass prefers drained or dry soils consisting of clay loam or sand, especially areas tending to be less fertile. The plant is resistant to drought and temperature variations.

== Invasive species ==
Bromus hordeaceus can be a weed in cereal crops. It grows in wheat and spring barley crops competing and reducing their yield. The seeds can contaminate the crop seeds and lower seed quality.

There are very few herbicides that selectively control soft brome in wheat or barley. The management of this weed is mostly based on an integrated programme. This includes hygiene to minimise its introduction to the fields as well as cleaning the fence lines where the infestation is more severe. A good crop rotation is useful as B. hordeaceus can be controlled with several herbicides in most other crops in the rotation. Growers in New Zealand use stubble burning to reduce the seed input in the following crops.

== Subspecies ==
Bromus hordeaceus subsp. ferronii, the least soft brome, is a rare annual that occurs in northwestern Europe. The grass is tufted and erect or decumbent. The spikelets are villous and the awns are spreading or twisted. This subspecies can be used for erosion control.

Bromus hordeaceus subsp. hordeaceus, the soft brome or soft chess, is an annual or biennial occurring in Europe, western North America, and northeastern North America. The culms are 10–70 cm (3.9–27.6 in) tall. The subspecies lacks auricles and the ligules are hyaline and smooth. The panicles are 5–10 cm (2.0–3.9 in) long. The spikelets are cleistogamous. The lemmas are 8–11 mm (0.31–0.43 in) long. The apex of the ovary is pubescent. This subspecies is primarily a forage plant, and occurs in waste places and roadsides. The subspecies has a diploid number of 14 or 28.

Bromus hordeaceus subsp. molliformis is a tufted annual occurring in France, Italy, California, Idaho, and New Mexico. The culms are 15–25 cm (5.9–9.8 in) tall. The subspecies has a contracted panicle about 10 cm (3.9 in) long, with villous spikelets. The pubescent lemmas are 8–11 mm (0.31–0.43 in) long and have rounded margins. The scabrid awns are somewhat erect. The subspecies grows as a weed in cultivated areas, typically in dry soils but rarely in wetlands.

Bromus hordeaceus subsp. pseudothominii occurs in Europe and sporadically throughout North America. The culms are 10–70 cm (3.9–27.6 in) tall. The panicles are up to 10 cm (3.9 in) long. The typically glabrous lemmas are 6.5–8 mm (0.26–0.31 in) long. The awns are straight and erect. The subspecies can be mistaken for Bromus lepidus in its similar lemma form and characteristics. It grows in meadows and grasslands.

Bromus hordeaceus subsp. thominei, the lesser soft brome, occurs in West Europe and the western United States, in California and the Pacific coast of Canada. The culms are 2–16 cm (0.79–6.30 in) long. The panicles are 1–3 cm (0.39–1.18 in) long and often consist of a single spikelet. The pubescent or glabrous lemmas are 6.5–7.5 mm (0.26–0.30 in) long, with bluntly angled margins. The awns can become divaricate when mature. The subspecies grows in waste areas and sandy soils or dunes. The subspecies has a diploid number of 28.
