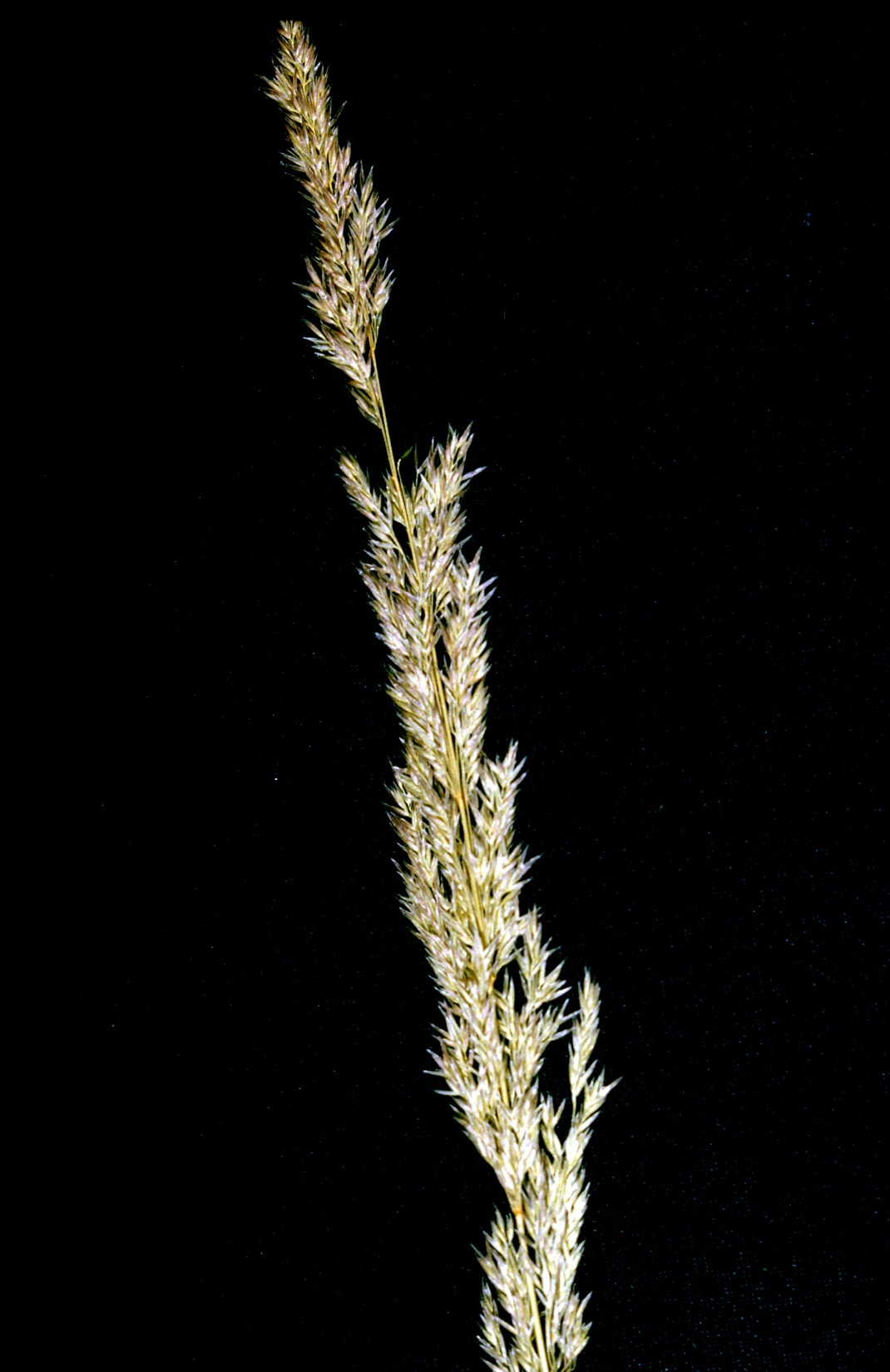

Conservation status
- Secure (NatureServe)

Scientific classification
- Kingdom: Plantae
- Clade: Tracheophytes
- Clade: Angiosperms
- Clade: Monocots
- Clade: Commelinids
- Order: Poales
- Family: Poaceae
- Subfamily: Pooideae
- Genus: Agrostis
- Species: A. exarata

Binomial name
- Agrostis exarata Trin.

Synonyms
- Agrostis aenea Agrostis alaskana Agrostis ampla Agrostis asperifolia Agrostis longiligula Agrostis melaleuca

= Agrostis exarata =

Species of grass

Agrostis exarata is a species of grass known by the common names spike bentgrass, spike bent, Pacific bentgrass, and spike redtop. It is native to western North America from Texas to the Aleutian Islands.

== Description ==
This is a common perennial grass reaching one to three feet in height with long, thin, flat leaves each with a ligule of 2–4 millimetres (0.079–0.157 in).

The tuft inflorescence may be up to 30 centimetres (12 in) long and is usually dense with tiny spikelets. It reproduces mainly by seed, but it can also spread via rhizome. This bunchgrass occurs in many plant communities in varied climates. It is considered good forage for livestock.
