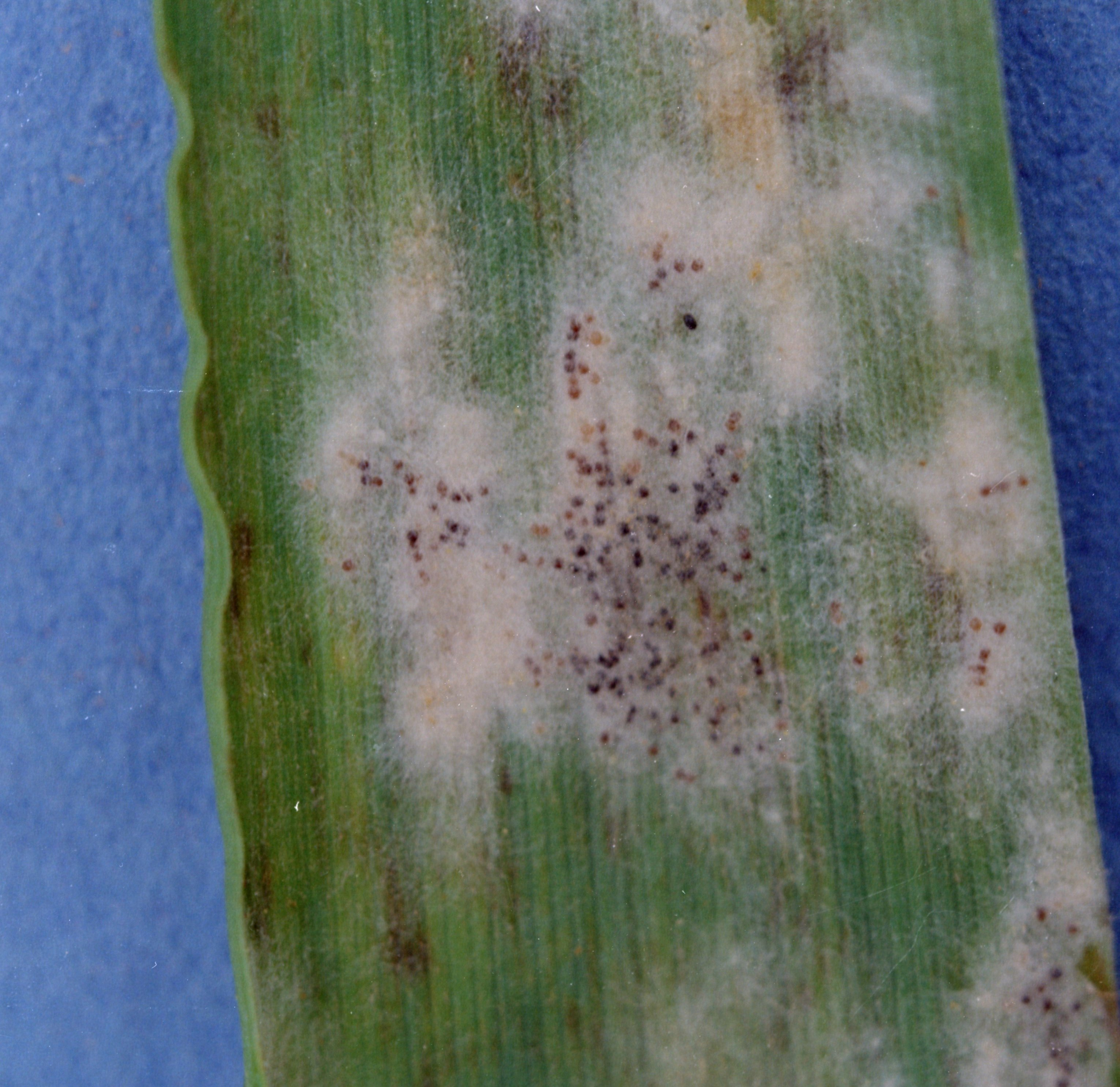
- Blumeria, to which the type species of Oidium now belongs. Oidium monilioides is the only Oidium species to belong to Blumeria, the rest belong to other genera.

Scientific classification
- Kingdom: Fungi
- Division: Ascomycota
- Class: Leotiomycetes
- Order: Helotiales
- Family: Erysiphaceae
- Genus: Oidium; Link, 1824

Type species
- Oidium monilioides (Nees) Link, 1824

= Oidium (genus) =

Former fungal anamorph genus

Oidium was an anamorphic genus of plant pathogenic fungi in the family Erysiphaceae (powdery mildews). Members of the genus were found on a very large variety of plant species across multiple families and distributed on every continent bar Antarctica.

== Description ==
Oidium species were the anamorphs of multiple powdery mildew genera, meaning they were the asexual reproduction stage of the species, spreading via means of conidia dispersed in water or wind. These fungi appear as white patches of mycelium on the leaves of their hosts.

== Taxonomy ==
The genus Oidium had been assigned to anamorphs of powdery mildews (often where the teleomorph or its taxonomic affinity was not necessarily known) for over a century before the 'one fungus, one name' changes in the Melbourne Code made the genus obsolete. With this change, fungi that had previously been known under two binomial names (one for the anamorph and one for the teleomorph) were now to be known only under the teleomorph name. As the type species of Oidium was O. monilioides, which had the teleomorph Blumeria graminis, Oidium sensu stricto was officially absorbed into Blumeria. However, unlike other anamorphic genera which clearly corresponded to a single teleomorphic genus, Oidium species now belonged to many different genera. While many Oidium species have now been given their new correct combination, some are still undefined and haven't been updated.

Further complicating the matter is the fact that Oidium was also formerly used to refer to multiple taxa outside the Erysiphaceae. One example is the yeast Candida albicans, once known as Oidium albicans. The commonly used name for powdery mildew in French is "oïdium" (with the same roots as the scientific name – the word has its origins in the New Latin word ōidium, equivalent to Ancient Greek ᾠόν (ōión, "egg") + -idium), likely referring to the egg-shaped conidia that are common in these fungal anamorphs. "Oidium" can also refer to a conidium itself.
