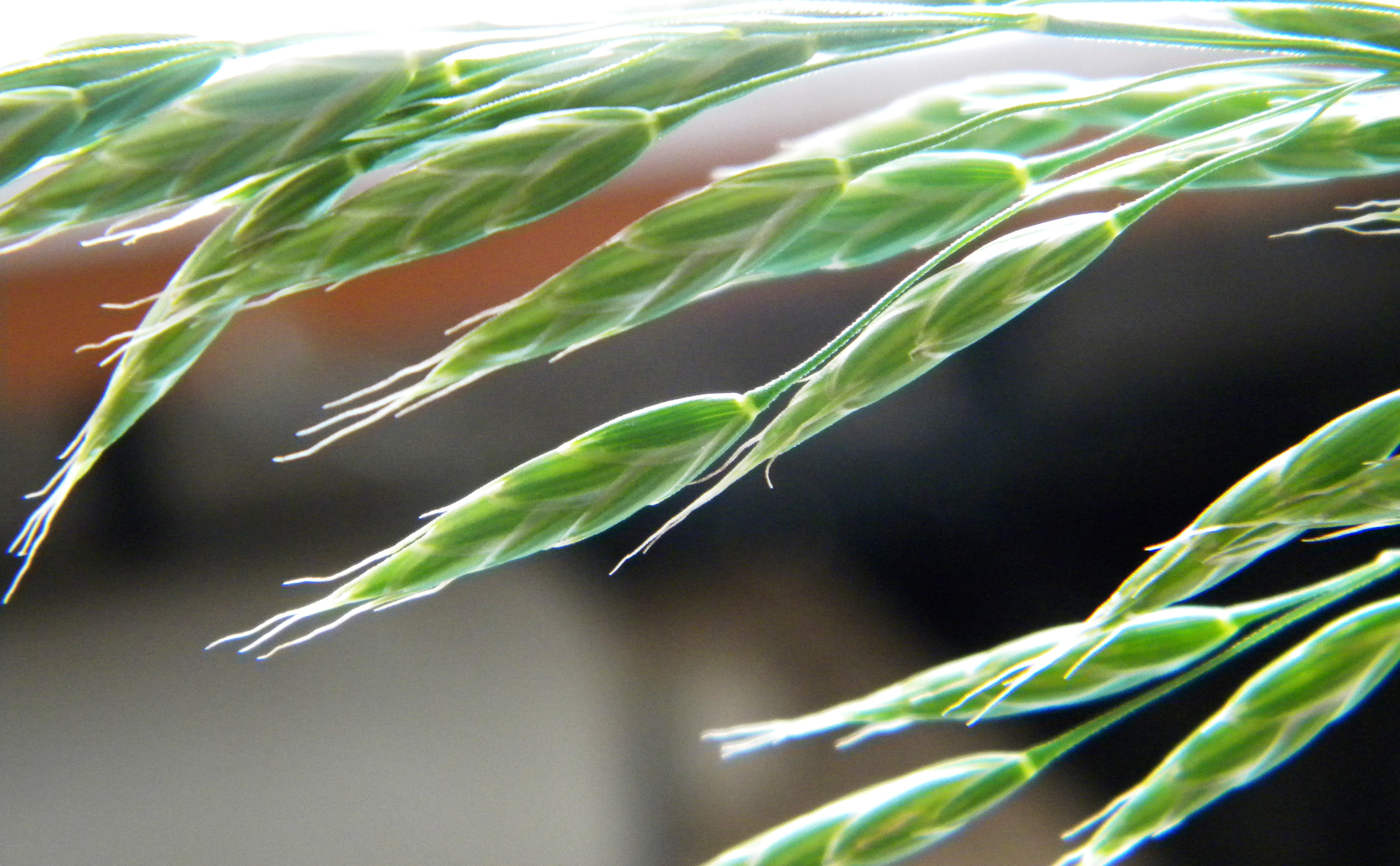
- Seedheads
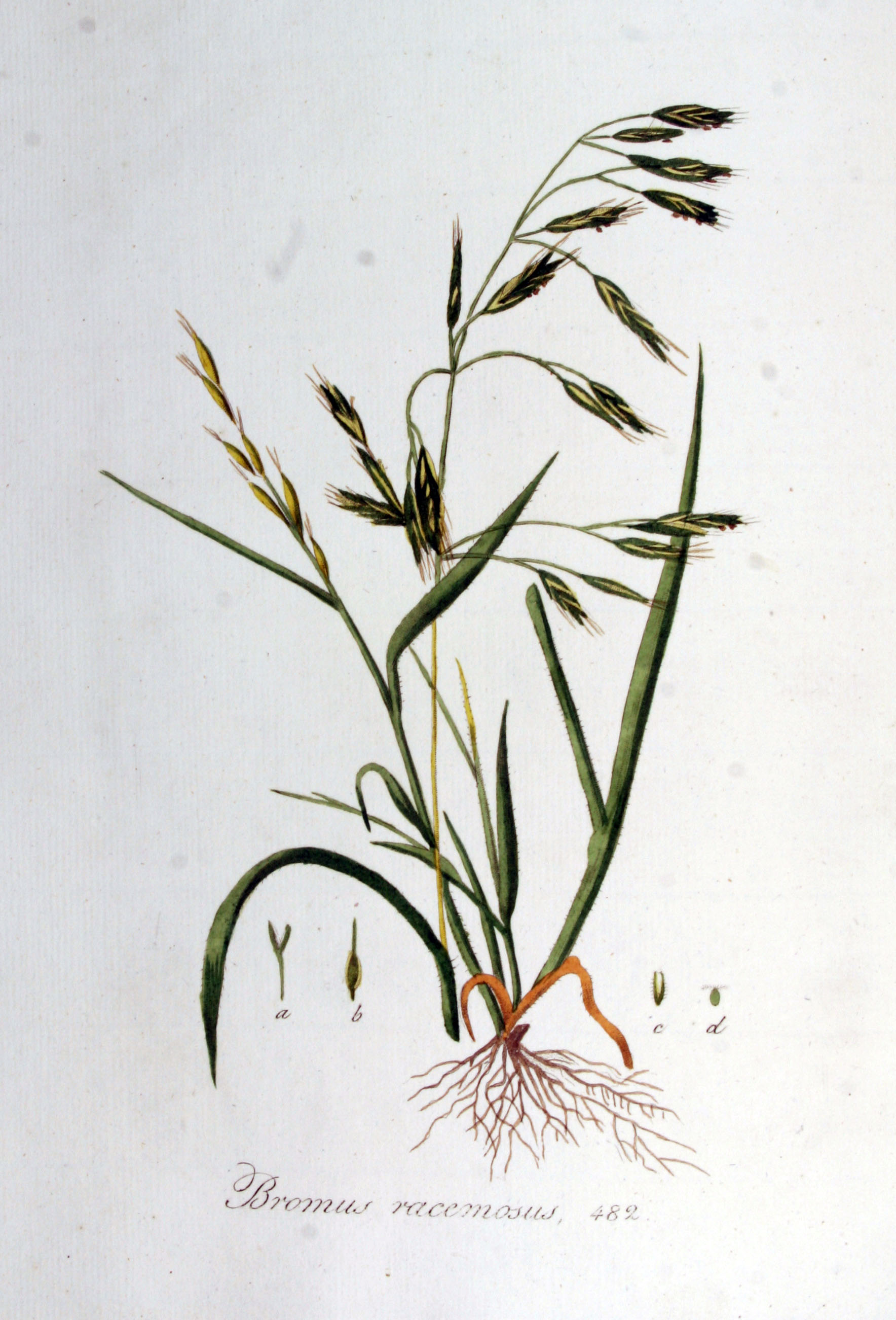
- Botanical illustration

Scientific classification
- Kingdom: Plantae
- Clade: Tracheophytes
- Clade: Angiosperms
- Clade: Monocots
- Clade: Commelinids
- Order: Poales
- Family: Poaceae
- Subfamily: Pooideae
- Genus: Bromus
- Species: B. racemosus

Binomial name
- Bromus racemosus L.

Synonyms
- List: Bromus agrarius Hornung ex Steud.; Bromus hordeaceus var. glabrescens (Coss.) Shear; Bromus hordeaceus f. leiostachys (Hartm.) Hyl.; Bromus hordeaceus f. leptostachys (Pers.) Wiegand; Bromus leptostachys (Pers.) Steud.; Bromus lusitanicus Sales & P.M.Sm.; Bromus mollis var. glabrescens Coss.; Bromus mollis f. leiostachys (Hartm.) Fernald; Bromus mollis var. leiostachys Hartm.; Bromus mollis var. leptostachys Pers.; Bromus multiflorus Roth; Bromus popovii Drobow; Bromus racemosus f. brachystachys (Schur) Todor; Bromus racemosus subsp. lusitanicus (Sales & P.M.Sm.) H.Scholz & Spalton; Bromus racemosus f. pratorum (Schur) Todor; Bromus supernovus H.Scholz; Bromus tuzsonii Pénzes; Forasaccus racemosus (L.) Bubani; Michelaria hirsuta Davr.; Serrafalcus racemosus (L.) Parl.; Serrafalcus velutinus Parl.

= Bromus racemosus =

Species of grass

Bromus racemosus, the smooth brome or bald brome, is a species of flowering plant in the family Poaceae. It is native to subarctic and temperate Eurasia, and widely introduced elsewhere, including North America, Iceland, the Southern Cone of South America, the Korean Peninsula, Australia, and New Zealand. It grows in alkaline meadows and in waste places.

== Description ==
Bromus racemosus is an annual grass growing 17–60 cm (6.7–23.6 in) tall. Its smooth culms are 1–2.1 mm (0.039–0.083 in) wide at their base. Its brown nodes are minutely to densely pubescent, with these soft and wavy hairs growing up to 1.2 mm (0.047 in) long. Its membranous and glabrous ligules are 0.5–2 mm (0.020–0.079 in) long. Its leaf blades are 2.7–12 cm (1.1–4.7 in) long and 1–3 mm (0.039–0.118 in) wide; the adaxial surface of the blade is densely covered by stiff hairs growing up to 0.8 mm (0.031 in) long, and the abaxial surface is densely covered with stiff hairs which are typically shorter, growing up to 0.6–0.8 mm (0.024–0.031 in). The margins of the blades are smooth or serrulate. Its panicles are 3–8.5 cm (1.2–3.3 in) long and 1–2.5 cm (0.39–0.98 in) wide, with erect to ascending branches which range between scabrous and pubescent. Each branch has a single spikelet, with the lowest inflorescence node having one to four branches. The ovate-lanceolate spikelets are 1.5–2.2 cm (0.59–0.87 in) long, with the rachilla occasionally visible at maturity. The spikelets have six to nine florets. Its glumes are smooth or scabrous, with lower glumes 5.2–6.7 mm (0.20–0.26 in) long and upper glumes 6.2–8.5 mm (0.24–0.33 in) long. The lower glumes have three to five nerves, upper glumes have seven to nine nerves, and lemmas have seven to nine nerves. Its lemmas are 6.5–9.5 mm (0.26–0.37 in) long, and its awns are 3.4–8.5 mm (0.13–0.33 in) long.

== Habitat and distribution ==
In its native Europe, Bromus racemosus occurs in moist meadows and grasslands, though it is threatened by changes in agricultural grassland management. In its introduced habitat in North America, B. racemosus occurs in waste places, fields, roadsides, and gravelly hills in scattered locations throughout the United States and Canada. In South America, the grass occurs in the southern Andes of Argentina and Chile.
