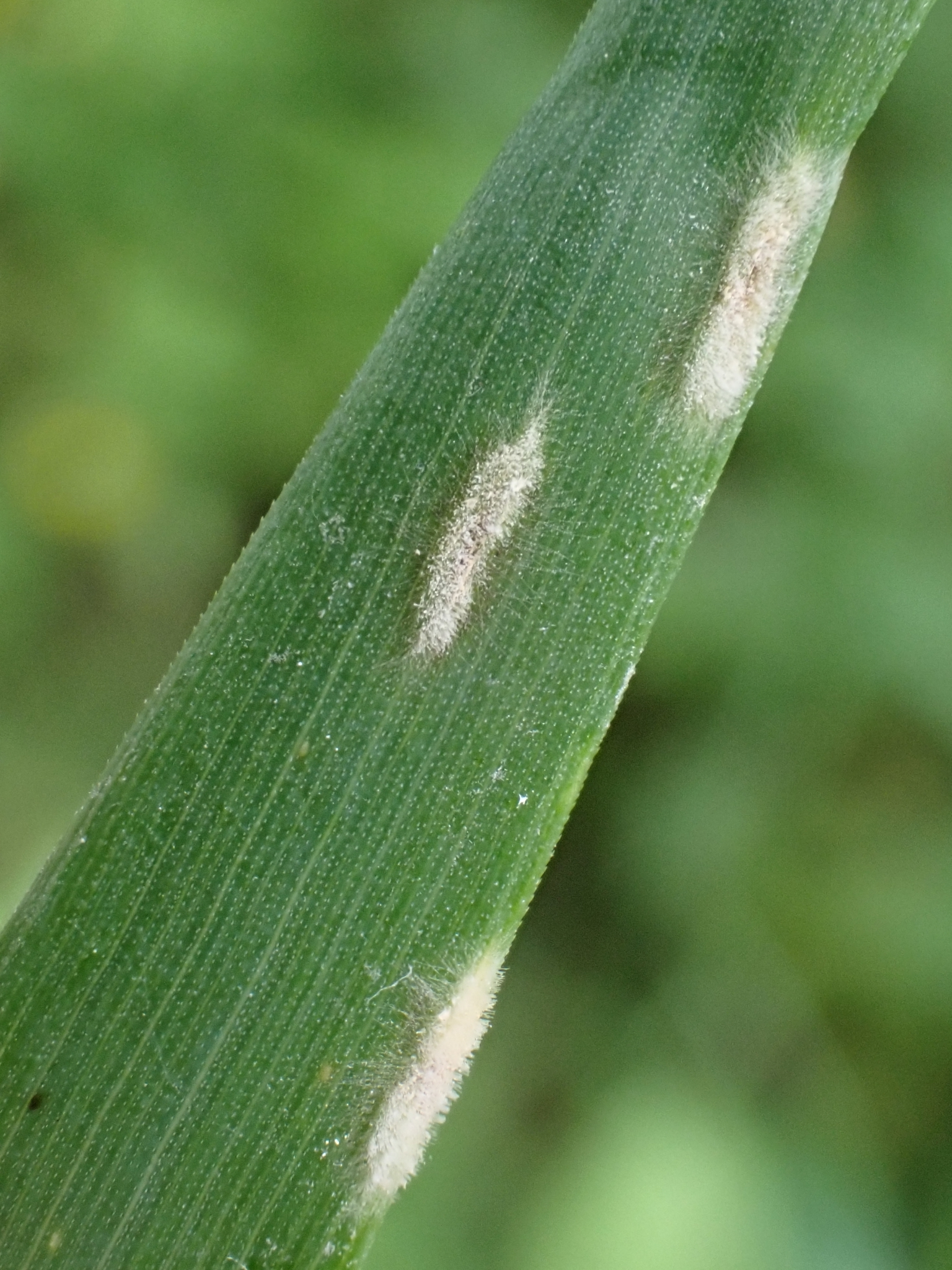
- Blumeria graminis on Elymus repens in Sweden

Scientific classification
- Kingdom: Fungi
- Division: Ascomycota
- Class: Leotiomycetes
- Order: Helotiales
- Family: Erysiphaceae
- Genus: Blumeria
- Species: B. graminis

Binomial name
- Blumeria graminis (DC.) Speer, 1975

Synonyms
- List: Erysiphe graminis DC., 1815; Alphitomorpha communis var. graminearum Wallr., 1819; Erysibe communis var. graminum Link, 1824; Acrosporium monilioides Nees, 1817; Oidium monilioides (Nees) Link, 1824; Oospora moniliaforme Wallr., 1833; Oospora moniliformis Wallr., 1833; Torula papillata Bonord., 1861; Oidium papillatum (Bonord.) Sacc. & Voglino, 1886; Torula rubella Bonord., 1860; Oidium rubellum (Bonord.) Sacc. & Voglino, 1886; Monilia hyalina Fr., 1815; Acrosporium hyalinum (Fr.) Sumst., 1913; Oidium tritici Lib., 1837; Torula tritici (Lib.) Corda, 1842

= Blumeria graminis =

Species of fungus

Blumeria graminis is a species of powdery mildew in the family Erysiphaceae. It is found around the world where it infects a variety of hosts in the family Poaceae (grasses). It was formerly considered to be the only species of powdery mildew infecting grasses, however there are now at least seven other species in the genus Blumeria.

== Description ==
The fungus forms thick white mycelial growth on the leaves of its hosts. With time, the mycelium often turns to tan brown. When present, the chasmothecia are often densely packed. This species reportedly thrives in cool, humid climates and proliferates in cloudy weather conditions. As with most Erysiphaceae, Blumeria graminis is fairly host-specific, although it still has a large host range compared to many members of the family. Blumeria graminis can be found infecting Aegilops, Brachypodium, Dasypyrum, Elymus (including Hystrix), Hordeum, Milium, Phleum, Secale, and Triticum. However, many of these genera more commonly host other species of Blumeria (such as Hordeum with Blumeria hordei). Blumeria graminis can be found on all continents bar Antarctica and in any habitats where its host species can be found. All Erysiphaceae are obligate biotrophs which require a living host to survive, and Blumeria graminis is no exception.

== Taxonomy ==
Blumeria graminis was first described by de Candolle in 1815 with the basionym Erysiphe graminis. The former anamorph of this species was Oidium monilinoides. The genus Blumeria was apparently erected to accommodate this species due to its differences with Erysiphe by Golovin in 1958, however this was illegitimately created as it came with no Latin description. In 1975, Speer correctly redescribed the genus and coined the new combination Blumeria graminis. The variation in this species had been long observed, and many formae and formae speciales were created throughout the twentieth century. In 2021, Blumeria graminis was split up into multiple different species with varying levels of host specificity. The generic name Blumeria is in honour of Samuel Blumer, a Swiss botanist and mycologist whose observations originally indicated the powdery mildews on grasses differed from others in the genus Erysiphe.

== Pathology ==
Blumeria graminis in its former, broadly defined, state has been used many times for studies on the evolutionary relationships between hosts and pathogens. Sequencing of the genome of the (then) B. graminis. f. sp. tritici, allowed inference of important aspects of its evolution. The ability to infect tetraploid as well as domesticated hexaploid wheat, was seen to be the result of mildew genomes being mosaics of ancient haplogroups that existed before wheat domestication. The species has even been used to investigate the relationship between two different pathogens on the same host. One study found that the number, size, and reproductive capacity of colonies of Blumeria graminis was reduced by the presence of Zymoseptoria tritici.

Due to its prevalence globally and its host specificity to a vital crop species, management of Blumeria graminis has been a high priority for millennia of wheat producers. In the modern day, the most common management technique is the application of fungicides. As well as conventional fungicides, another chemical treatment involves treating wheat with a silicon solution or calcium silicate slag. Silicon helps the plant cells defend against fungal attack by degrading haustoria and by producing callose and papilla. With silicon treatment, epidermal cells are less susceptible to powdery mildew.

Another way to control wheat powdery mildew is breeding in genetic resistance, using resistance genes to prevent infection. Over 100 formally and/or temporarily designated powdery mildew resistance genes/alleles have so far been identified in wheat. However, Blumeria graminis can and has evolved to counteract the resistance provided by some alleles.

== Micromorphology ==
=== Description ===
The primary mycelium is first white, becoming pigmented. The secondary mycelium is dense, appearing woolly to felt-like. It occurs on the leaf in patches, often around chasmothecia. The original colour of mycelium is dingy greyish white to grey, which turns tan-coloured with age. The hyphal appressoria are described as nipple-shaped, occasionally lobe-shaped, occurring either singly or opposite in pairs. Conidiophores have a swollen foot-cell characteristic of the genus. The chasmothecia (fruiting bodies) are surrounded by bristle-like secondary hyphae. Chasmothecial appendages are found in the lower half, and are simple and myceloid. The peridium of the chasmothecia is obscure and irregularly polygonal. Blumeria graminis has eight spores per ascus which are roughly ellipsoid and colourless. The asci are typically subcylindrical or saccate.

=== Measurements ===
Primary hyphal cells measure 30–55 × 3–7 μm. Secondary hyphal cells measure 220–500 × 3–7 μm. Hyphal appressoria are 3.5–7 μm wide. Conidiophores are 60–170 × 4–7 μm with foot cells measuring (20–)25–35(–40) × 5–7 μm. Conidia are (23–)28–40(–45) × (10–)14–18(–20.5) μm. The chasmothecia are 175–245(–260) μm in diameter when mature with peridium cells 8–20 μm in diameter. Asci number 6–30 and are (50–)80–95(–105) × 20–45 μm with ascospores measuring 20–24 × 10–14 μm.
