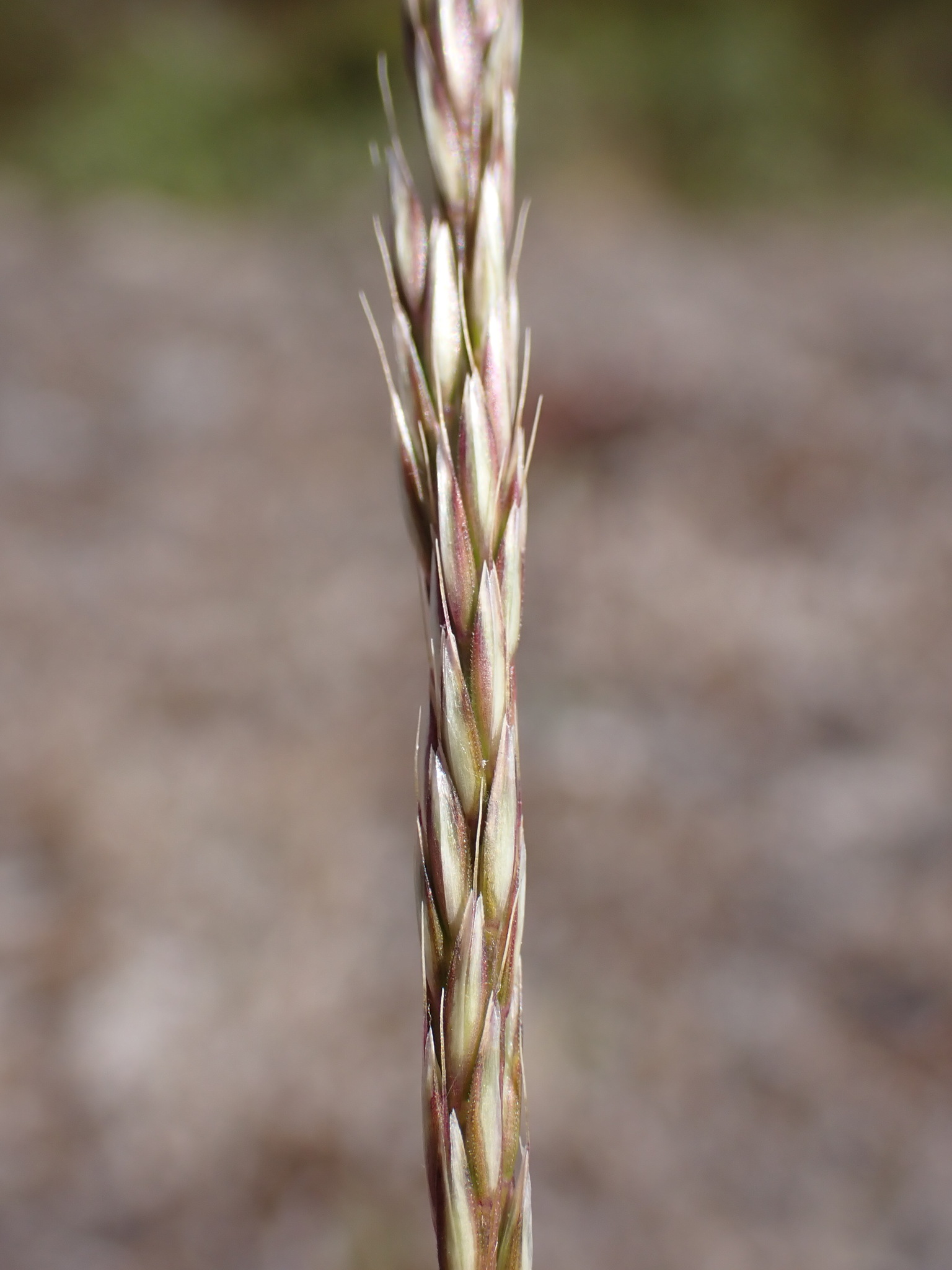
- Pentapogon avenoides in Upper Hutt

Conservation status
- Not Threatened (NZ TCS)

Scientific classification
- Kingdom: Plantae
- Clade: Tracheophytes
- Clade: Angiosperms
- Clade: Monocots
- Clade: Commelinids
- Order: Poales
- Family: Poaceae
- Subfamily: Pooideae
- Genus: Pentapogon
- Species: P. avenoides

Binomial name
- Pentapogon avenoides (Hook.f.) P.M.Peterson, Romasch. & Soreng

= Pentapogon avenoides =

Species of grass

Pentapogon avenoides, or mountain oat grass, is a common species of grass endemic to New Zealand, where it is found throughout. With Pentapogon crinitus, it's the most widespread species of Pentapogon in New Zealand. It can be found in open areas such as grasslands, as well as scrub and light forest, and is found from sea level to the alpine zone.

It was originally described as Agrostis avenoides by Joseph Dalton Hooker in 1864. It has undergone a number of taxonomic changes in the recent past, but has also been known as Deyeuxia avenoides and Calamagrostis avenoides.

== Description ==
P. avenoides grows in small, slender tufts, with 15-75cm culms, tipped with a panicle inflorescence. Panicles are 3.5–20 cm long, and usually very thin (c. 0.8–2.5 mm diameter). Spikelets are 1-flowered, 3-7mm long, and light green to purplish green. The glumes totally enclose the floret, except for the lemma awn, which exceeds them. Florets are tipped by a callus, whose hairs are important for identification. It has callus hairs to ⅓ the length of the lemma, a rachilla prolongation 0.8–1.5 mm in length, and its awn coming from near the base of the lemma.

It has 2n = 70 chromosomes, which is equivalent to a 10x ploidy level.

==== Similar species ====
P. avenoides is most similar to the short-awned Pentapogon species with contracted panicles, such as P. youngii, P. lacustris, and P. quadrisetis.

P. avenoides is most similar to P. lacustris, from which it differs by its awn being from near the base of the lemma (versus from the upper quarter) and the rachilla being tipped by a long hair tuft. P. avenoides can be cleistogamous or chasmogamous, whereas P. lacustris is exclusely cleistogamous. P. lacustris is also a very rare species known from only a few sites.

Given their shared distribution, P. avenoides is more likely to be confused with P. quadrisetis. P. quadrisetis is usually a larger plant, and has no rachilla prolongation.

== Distribution ==
The distribution of Pentapogon avenoides from AVH and iNaturalist records.

P. avenoides is endemic to New Zealand. It is common throughout the North, South, Stewart, and Chatham Islands.

The type specimen of P. avenoides was collected from Rangitata River in Canterbury by Andrew Sinclair & Julius von Haast in January 1860. It was mentioned by Hooker in his description, but was only formally designated as a lectotype by Elizabeth Edgar in 1995.

== Habitat and ecology ==
P. avenoides plant in habitat in the Ruahine Ranges

The habitat ranges from light forest cover to scrub and grassland (including tussock grassland), from sea level to the alpine region.

==== Associated species ====
P. avenoides is often described growing in depleted native grasslands. At one site, it is described as growing in hard tussock (Festuca novae-zelandiae) grassland, alongside matagouri (Discaria toumatou) shrubs, and other grasses such as Anthosachne scabra, Rytidosperma species, and the daisy Celmisia gracilenta.

At another site, it is described as growing in an exotic grassland dominated by browntop (Agrostis capillaris) and sweet vernal grass (Anthoxanthum odoratum), alongside species like the small native heath Styphelia nesophila, the mat-daisy Raoulia subsericea, golden spaniard (Aciphylla aurea) and hard tussock (Festuca novae-zelandiae).

It can also be found in shrubland and forest environments, such as in heather (Calluna vulgaris) shrubland with forest fairy grass (Rytidosperma gracile) and under light black beech (Nothofagus solandri)/hard beech (N. truncata) forest on clay banks.

==== Pathogens ====
Claviceps ergot infecting a P. avenoides seed

P. avenoides is a host of the fungus Glomerella graminicola, which has been found on a specimen from Waikumete Cemetery in Auckland. It is also a host of the fungus Puccinia graminis, with one specimen from Porters Pass. Both fungi form leaf-spots or leaf-streaks on the leaves of numerous grass species.

It is also a host of an unknown Claviceps ergot fungus, an insect-dispersed fungus which parasitises the seeds of grasses.

==== Life cycle ====
P. avenoides flowers predominantly from December to February, with seeds developing soon thereafter. Seeds slowly disperse by wind after they dry out, with empty (or nearly empty) panicles often remaining on the plant for many months.

P. avenoides with chasmogamous flowers

The flowers are capable of self-crossing, but some plants will also out-cross. Many plants are exclusively self-crossing, due to their cleistogamous flowers, whose pistils and anthers never open to the air. Some individuals have chasmogamous flowers, whose pistils and anthers do open to the air, allowing them to be wind-pollinated. Other than having visible anthers and pistils outside of their florets, chasmogamous plants have much larger anthers, more robust culms, and wider panicles. While these plants are seemingly distinct from one-another, there is no geographical separation, with both forms growing together.

== Threats ==
P. avenoides is classified as Not Threatened under the New Zealand Threat Classification System. In the regional conservation statuses, it is classified as Not Threatened in Otago and Wellington, Threatened – Regionally Endangered in Northland, and Data Deficient in Auckland. In Northland, there is only an estimated 250–1000 known plants.

== Taxonomy ==
It was originally described as Agrostis avenoides by Joseph Dalton Hooker in 1864, from plants collected from Rangitata River in Canterbury, and the lake district of Otago.

Pentapogon avenoides, as illustrated by John Buchanan in 1880

In 1880, John Buchanan created a combination for it in Deyeuxia. Later, in 1908, Leonard Cockayne created a combination in Calamagrostis. The preferred names have oscillated between these two since then.

Northern Hemisphere treatments generally sink Deyeuxia into Calamagrostis. More recently, in 2022, molecular evidence found that Deyeuxia and Australasian and Malesian Calamagrostis were grouped together in a clade with Dichelachne in subtribe Echinopogoninae, apart from Calamagrostis. They made a combination for a number of New Zealand and Australian species, one of which was P. avenoides, within Pentapogon, for the first time. Since then, the remainder of the New Zealand taxa (Pentapogon aucklandicus, P. lacustris, and P. youngii) have been moved from Deyeuxia into Pentapogon. All remaining species formerly placed within Dichelachne and Deyeuxia are now recognised by the New Zealand Flora Committee as within Pentapogon.

==== Potential segregate taxa ====
Recent cytological work suggests that some populations have different sized genomes. This indicates that there are likely undescribed taxa currently recognised within the species.

==== Etymology ====
Pentapogon: From the Greek pente, meaning five, and pogon, meaning beard, referring to the traditional identification of the genus being based on it having 5 awns.

avenoides: From the Latin Avena, meaning oat (this is also the modern binomial name for the oat genus), and the Latin suffix -oides, meaning -like, referring to the oat-like structure of the inflorescence.

== Gallery ==
P. avenoides panicle

P. avenoides florets

P. avenoides in scrub habitat

P. avenoides specimen
