= Bromus lithobius =

Scientific classification
- Kingdom: Plantae
- Clade: Tracheophytes
- Clade: Angiosperms
- Clade: Monocots
- Clade: Commelinids
- Order: Poales
- Family: Poaceae
- Subfamily: Pooideae
- Genus: Bromus
- Species: B. lithobius

Binomial name
- Bromus lithobius Trin.

Species of plant

Bromus lithobius is a species of brome grass known by the common name Chilean brome in English. It is native to Chile and Argentina, but is introduced in Australia and New Zealand. It was described as Bromus lithobius by Carl Bernhard von Trinius in 1835.

It is one of several species in the Bromus catharticus complex within the Bromus section Ceratochloa, all of which are hexaploids with the chromosome count 2n=42.

== Description ==
B. lithobius, showing short pubescent hairs

Bromus lithobius is a short, tufted pasture grass with spreading culms. Its culms bare an open panicle inflorescence, 10-20 cm long. Its spikelets are 2-3.5 cm long, with five to seven flowers. Its lemmas are pubescent and usually purple-suffused. The lemmas have a 4-6 mm awn.

=== Similar species ===
Bromus lithobius is part of Bromus section Ceratochloa, which are separated from other Bromus sections by their strongly keeled (folded, like the keel of a boat) lemmas, which make the spikelets laterally-compressed.

It can be separated from other members of the section Ceratochloa by the longer awns and distinctly pubescent hairs on its lemmas.

- From Bromus catharticus, B. lithobius has a more compact seed-head with upright or spreading branches. It has pubescent hairs, rather than being glabrous or scabrid.
- From B. cebadilla, B. lithobius has a longer lower glume (6-7.5mm rather than 4-4.5mm), is hairier, and is evenly green rather than green and yellow.

== Distribution ==
Bromus lithobius is native to Chile and Argentina, but introduced and naturalised in New Zealand and Australia.

=== Native range ===
In Chile, it is found from the IV to the XI Region, and in Argentina is found in the Andean-Patagonian region, southern Neuquén and northern Río Negro.

=== Introduced range ===
In New Zealand, it is found in North Island throughout south of Auckland City; in the South Island it is found in Nelson, Marlborough, and Canterbury.

In Australia, B. lithobius is found in Victoria and Tasmania. It is uncommon in Victoria, with most collections from domestic gardens in the vicinity of Melbourne. In Tasmania it in known only from around Hobart. One specimen listed from New South Wales has more recently been determined as Bromus coloratus.

=== Type specimen ===
The type locality of Bromus lithobius is described by Carl Bernhard von Trinius as "Chil. in lapidosis And. de Sta. Rosa", translating to: "in the stony places of the Andes of Santa Rosa, Chile".

== Habitat and Ecology ==
B. lithobius in grassland habitat

While in its native change (Chile) B. lithobius largely grows in natural grasslands and roadsides, it is normally found in human-associated environments in Australia and New Zealand. There, it often found associated with pastoral habitats, lawns, berms, urban waste spaces, and other exotic-dominated habitats.

As such, it is typically associated with other species common to those landscapes. In New Zealand, this means exotic species such as Cynodon dactylon, Digitaria sanguinalis, Trifolium repens, and Paspalum dilatatum, as described in one lawn in Whanganui, or species such as Iris foetidissima, Bromus catharticus, Bromus diandrus, Solanum nigrum, and Euphorbia peplus on a consolidated dune near Nelson.

B. lithobius grows from around sea level up to 1,800 metres.

=== Associated species ===
On Motukahakaha Island in the Hauraki Gulf, it is described as forming dense swards in black backed gull (Larus dominicanus) colonies.

B. lithobius is a host of the parasitic bacterion Xanthomonas bromi Vauterin, which causes wilt on species of Bromus.

=== Reproductive ecology ===
A B. lithobius with chasmogamous flowers

Bromus lithobius can reproduce either with cleistogamous (selfing) or chasmogamous (out-crossing) flowers. Cleistogamous flowers stay closed and are self-pollinated, whereas chasmogamous flowers open anthers and pistills to the air, allowing wind-pollination.

In Australia it flowers from October-January, and in New Zealand from September-February. In New Zealand it goes to seed from September-June.

== Taxonomy ==
B. lithobius was described by Carl Bernhard von Trinius in Linnaea volume 10, page 303 in 1835, from specimens collected in Santa Rosa, Chile.

=== Etymology ===
Bromus - from the Greek bromos (oat), out of broma (food).

lithobius - from the Latin lith- (rock or stone) and Greek bios (life), as in living on rock or stone.
