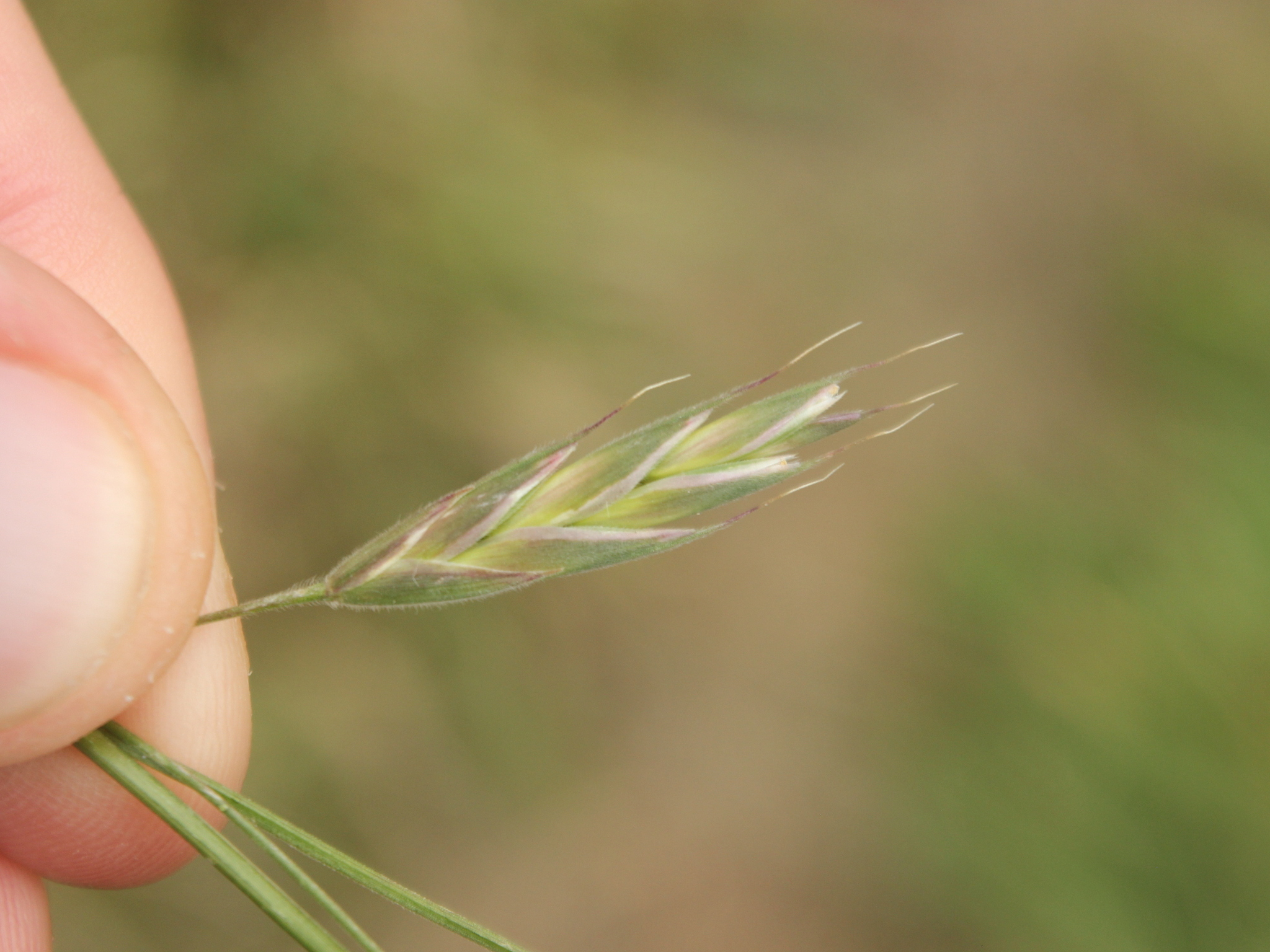

Scientific classification
- Kingdom: Plantae
- Clade: Tracheophytes
- Clade: Angiosperms
- Clade: Monocots
- Clade: Commelinids
- Order: Poales
- Family: Poaceae
- Subfamily: Pooideae
- Genus: Bromus
- Species: B. cebadilla

Binomial name
- Bromus cebadilla Steud.

= Bromus cebadilla =

Species of plant

Bromus cebadilla is a species of brome grass known by the common names Chilean brome, stripey brome, grazing brome, or pasture brome prairie grass in English, as well as cebadilla, llanco, lanco, or pasto del perro in Spanish. It is native to Chile and Argentina, but is introduced in several countries.

It is one of several species in the Bromus catharticus complex within the Bromus section Ceratochloa, all of which are hexaploids with the chromosome count 2n=42.

== Description ==
Bromus cebadilla is a short, tufted pasture grass with culms up to 130cm. Culms bare an open panicle inflorescence, 11.5-30cm long. Spikelets are 2.5-4cm long, and 5-9-flowered. Lemmas are glabrous to minutely hairy, and tend to be yellowy at bases and green at tips, occasionally reddish or purplish. The lemmas have a 3.5-9mm awn.

Bromus cebadilla is part of Bromus section Ceratochloa, which are separated from other Bromus sections by their strongly keeled (folded, like the keel of a boat) lemmas, which make the spikelets laterally-compressed. From most other Ceratochloa, it can be distinguished by either being glabrous or having very short hairs on the lemmas, but never being scabrid, and by its yellow-green lemmas.

=== Similar species ===
B. cebadilla is likely to be confused with B. catharticus (some treatments reduce it to a variety of this species - Bromus catharticus var. elatus), B. carinatus, and B. lithobius.

B. cebadilla is found throughout its range with B. catharticus. It is differentiated by the elliptic, rather than elliptic-oblong spikelets, and the longer awn (3.5-9mm rather than 0-3.5mm). B. cebadilla typically has tighter green florets with yellowy bases, whereas B. catharticus is variable in colour. In appearance it is more like B. carinatus than B. catharticus, with its long, thin spikelets and long awns.

B. cebadilla and B. lithobius are both found in Chile, Argentina, Australia, and New Zealand. B. lithobius has a longer lower glume (6-7.5mm c.f. 4-4.5mm in B. cebadilla), reliably pubescent lemmas, giving it a purplish colour. B. lithobius lacks the yellow-green colouration of B. cebadilla.

B. cebadilla and B. carinatus are found together and regularly confused in parts of California. The Bromus sitchensis complex (which includes B. carinatus), is distinguished from the Bromus catharticus complex (which includes B. cebadilla) by the lemmas which have 9-11 veins versus 7 prominent nerves.

== Distribution ==
Bromus cebadilla is native to the Andean-Patagonian region of Chile and Argentina. It is introduced and naturalised in New Zealand (South Island), Australia (Tasmania, New South Wales, and Victoria), and the United States (California). It has also been collected a single time in Arizona in 2008, and twice Oregon in 1908 and 1910.

=== Native Range ===
In Chile it is present practically throughout, being common from the coastal plains up to 1,000 metres above sea level in the Andes, as well as on Robinson Crusoe Island in the Juan Fernández archipelago. In Argentina, it is largely recorded along the border with Chile in western Patagonia, as well as on Tierra del Fuego.

Four type specimens are listed, all from Rancagua in the Juan Fernandez Islands of Chile. B. valdivianus, a synonym, was later described from specimens collected in Valdivia, Chile.

=== Introduced Range ===
In New Zealand, the first specimens of B. cebadilla were collected by Donald Petrie in 1910, likely in his garden in Mount Eden. By 1995, it was widely distributed, with many collections in the Central Plateau from Rotorua through to Lake Taupō and Tongariro National Park, as well as isolated collections from Cuvier Island, Auckland City, Blenheim, and Greendale near Christchurch. From 1992, it became commercially grown and distributed as a forage grass for agriculture, under the cultivar name 'Grasslands Gala'. From the Second Edition of the Flora V (Poaceae) in 2010, the additional locations of The Noises, Whanganui, and Mākaro/Ward Island in Wellington were listed. In 2025, B. cebadilla was commonly recorded throughout the Wellington Region, in the vicinity of Hamilton, and in the Nelson-Tasman area, as well as being found in many scattered localities, such as near Ruakākā, on Mayor Island, near Napier, in Palmerston North, and throughout the Canterbury and Otago Regions. There is a single specimen recorded from Chatham Island in 1992 that is not mentioned in any flora.

In Australia, the state and national flora's record B. cebadilla in New South Wales (as B. stamineus), Victoria, the Australian Capital Territory, and near Hobart, Tasmania.

In the United States, B. cebadilla is naturalised in California, and has been adventive in Oregon and Arizona. On GBIF, it is recorded mostly around the San Francisco Bay Area, near Sacramento and the Channel Islands, and in the Central Coast region.

== Habitat ==
In Chile, it grows in natural grasslands as well as along streets and roads in cities.

In New Zealand and California, B. cebadilla is listed as a roadside, grassland, and garden weed, characteristic of disturbed places. In California, it is a common garden and orchard weed, growing in disturbed soils.

== Uses ==
Reportedly, B. cebadilla produces good foliage in humid places and is considered a good forage crop. It is used for this in Chile, Argentina, and in New Zealand. In New Zealand it is noted as being intolerant of waterlogging, and as such is generally found in dry pastures.

== Ecology ==
In New Zealand, B. cebadilla is a host for the bacteria Pseudomonas syringae and Xanthamonas, which can cause wilting in wet conditions. It is impacted by the insects Hessian fly (Mayetiola destructor) and Argentine stem weevil (Listronotus bonariensis). Additionally, the fungi Ustilago bullata, Cercosporella bromivora, and Spermospora bromivora have been recorded growing on B. cebadilla leaves.

B. cebadilla is a largely self-crossing species with cleistogamous (un-opening) flowers, which occasionally produces chasmogamous (open) flowers that are wind-pollinated. It has a chromosome count of 2n=42.

=== Phenology ===
B. cebadilla flowers in November–January in Australia. In New Zealand, its flowering and fruiting peaks in November, but occurs sporadically throughout the year.

== Taxonomy ==
The type specimens of B. cebadilla were collected by Carlo Giuseppe Bertero in 1828 from Rancagua in the Juan Fernandez Islands of Chile. Based on those specimens, Ernst Gottlieb von Steudel (Steud.), described the species in 1854 in Synopsis plantarum glumacearum. Type specimens include ST: 117, 118, 861, and 1411.

Two synonyms, B. unioloides var. elata and B. stamineus were also described in 1854. B. valdivianus, another synonym, was described in 1857. In New Zealand from 1995, Bromus stamineus was considered separate from B. cebadilla and B. valdivianus (which were listed as synonyms under B. valdivianus). However, B. cebadilla and B. stamineus were described from the same specimen (ST 117; P; IT: US-865524 (fragm. ex P)). While both names were published in the same year, B. stamineus is thought to have been published in mid-1854, whereas B. cebadilla was published in April, and consequently takes priority. Thus, the two names are now generally considered synonyms by most sources, in favour of B. cebadilla. B. valdivianus, while valid, is usually considered the same species, and was published 3 years after B. cebadilla.

In 2006, the new name 'B. catharticus var. elatus' was published, based on the 1854 taxon Bromus unioloides var. elata, recognising the recent change from Bromus unioloides to Bromus catharticus. In the paper, their view was that B. cebadilla was not sufficiently morphologically different from B. catharticus to warrant recognition as separate species. This name is preferred in Argentina, California (United States), and Victoria (Australia).

Bromus cebadilla is regarded as the preferred taxon in several countries (including New Zealand, and most of Australia), as well as by the international plant taxonomy database POWO and the Catalogue of New World Grasses IV, with B. stamineus, B. catharticus var. elatus, and B. valdivianus listed as some of its synonyms.

Recognition in the United States depends on the author, with Flora of North America and The University and Jepson Herbaria using B. catharticus var. elatus, while the Catalogue of New World Grasses IV, and Systematics of California Grasses both use B. cebadilla.

=== Breeding experiments ===
Despite being reduced to a variety of B. catharticus in some sources, at least two studies have found that they produce near-sterile hybrids. The first, in 1949, found that hybrids produced less than 5% of the number of seeds that their parents produced. The second, in 1955, found that hybrids had a seed fertility rate of 15% compared to 90% in parent species.

== Etymology ==
Bromus - from the Greek bromos (oat), out of broma (food).

cebadilla - from the Spanish cebada (barley) and -illa (diminutive). As in 'little barley'.

== Gallery ==
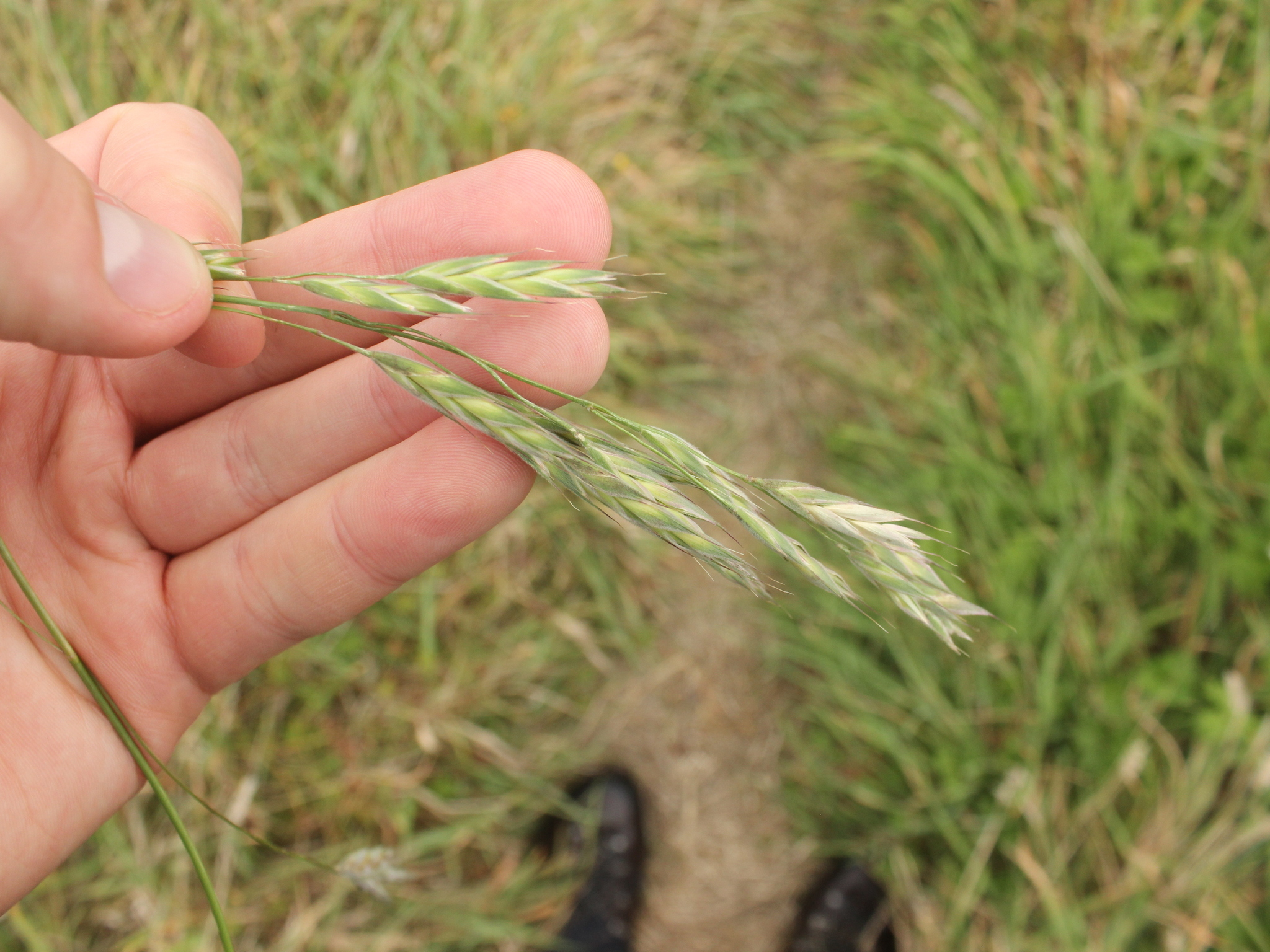
Bromus cebadilla panicle in Wellington, New Zealand

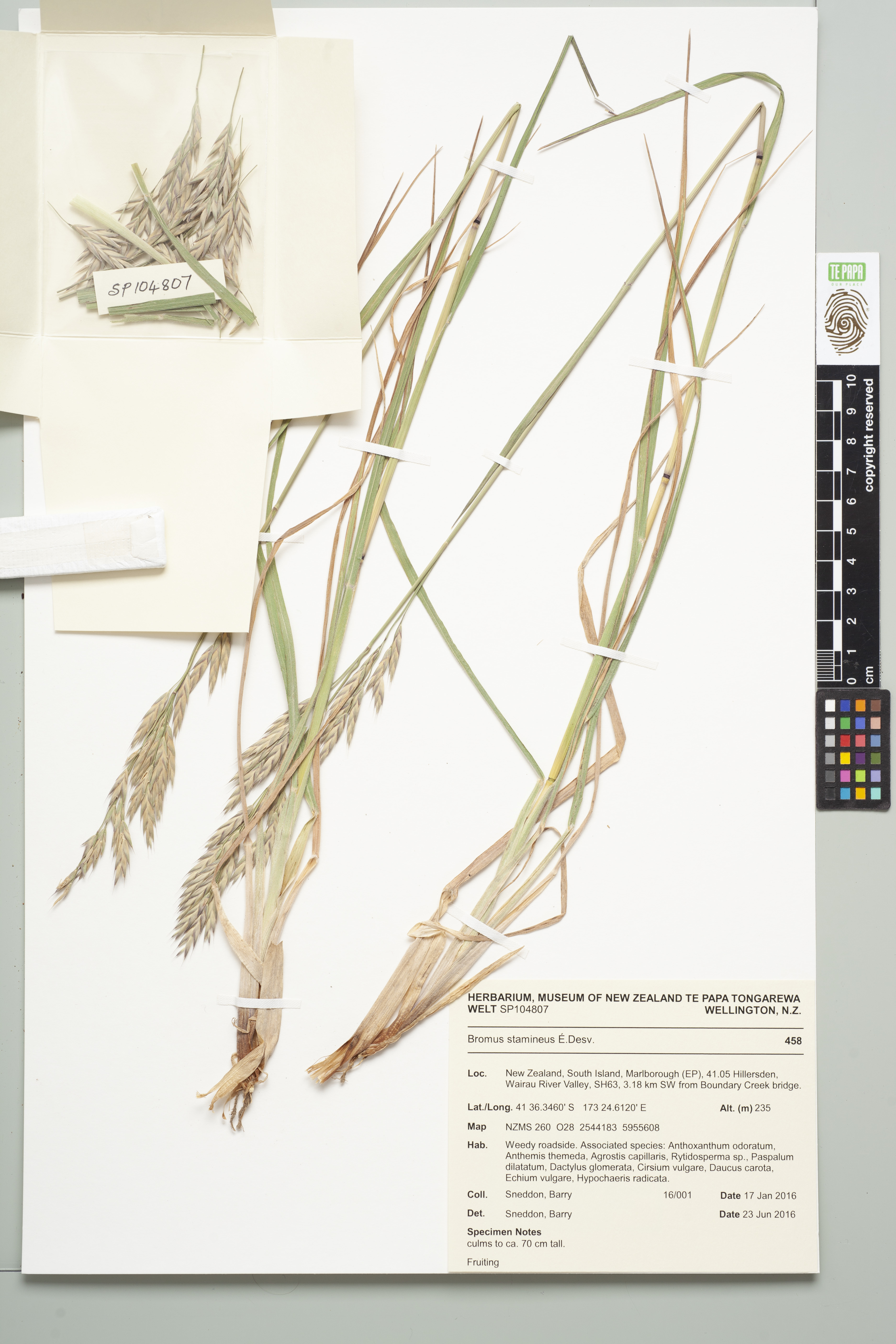
Bromus cebadilla specimen at Te Papa Herbarium (WELT)

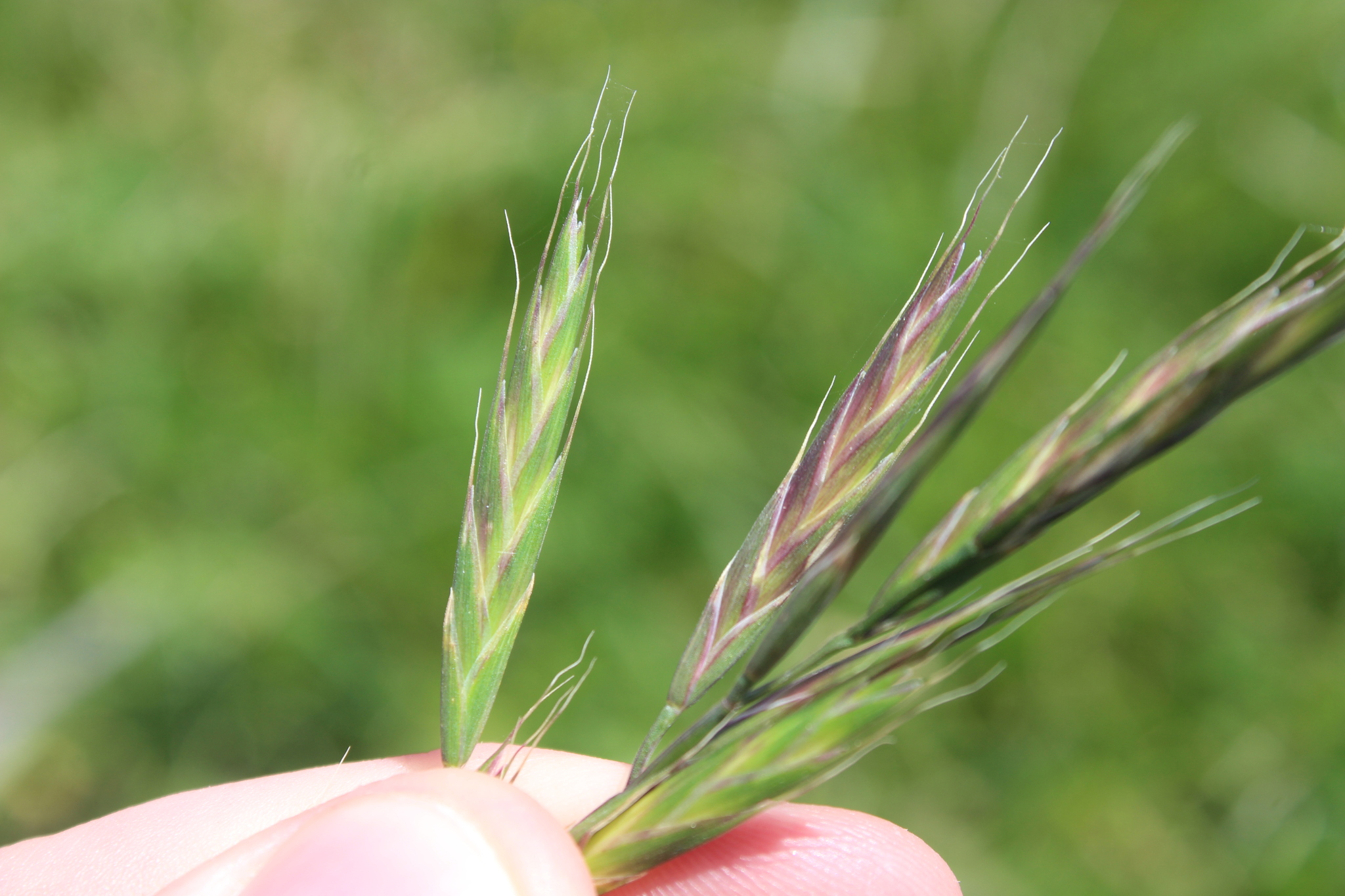
Bromus cebadilla plant, showing sun-reddened colouration

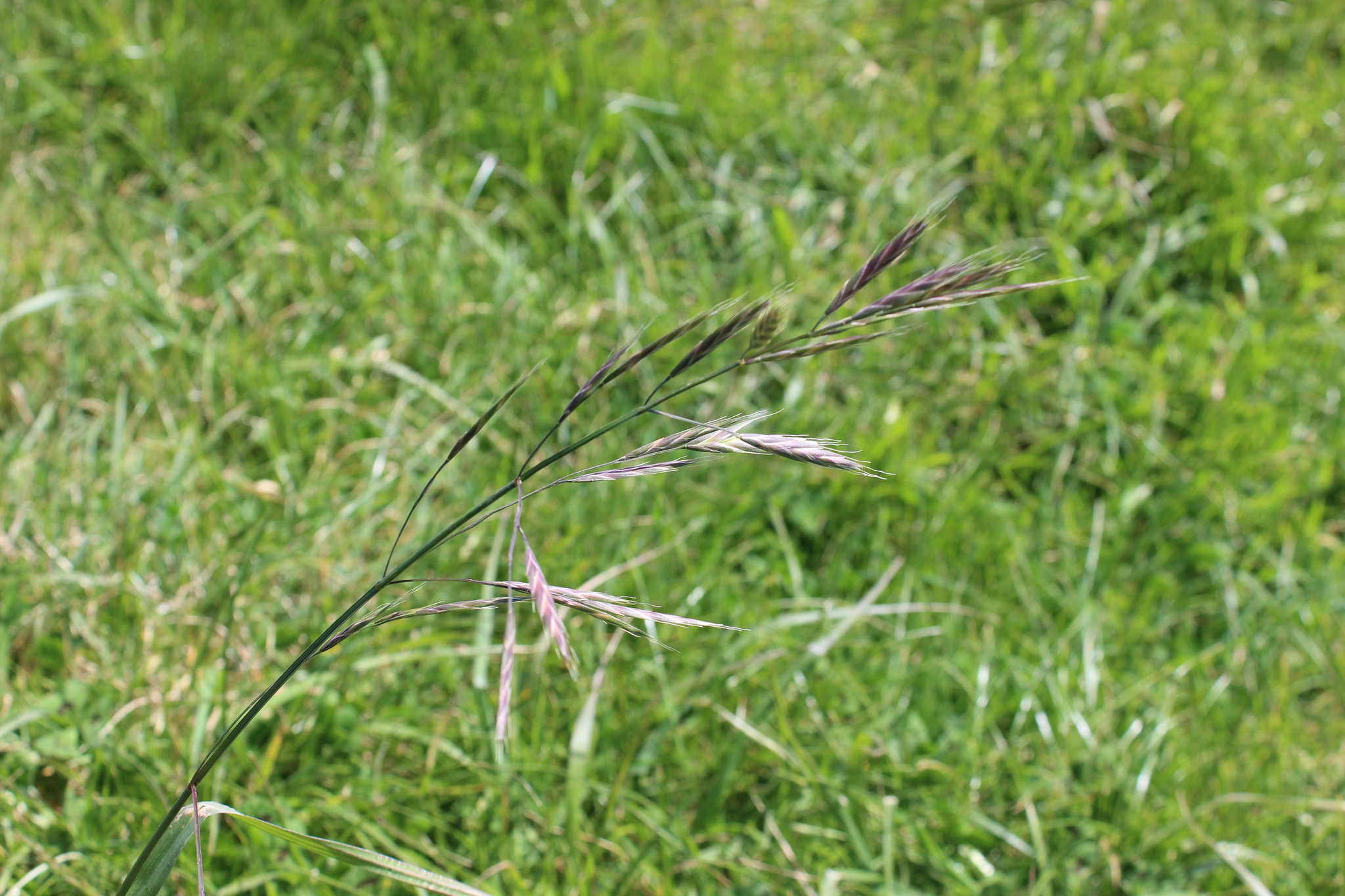
Whole plant of Bromus cebadilla
