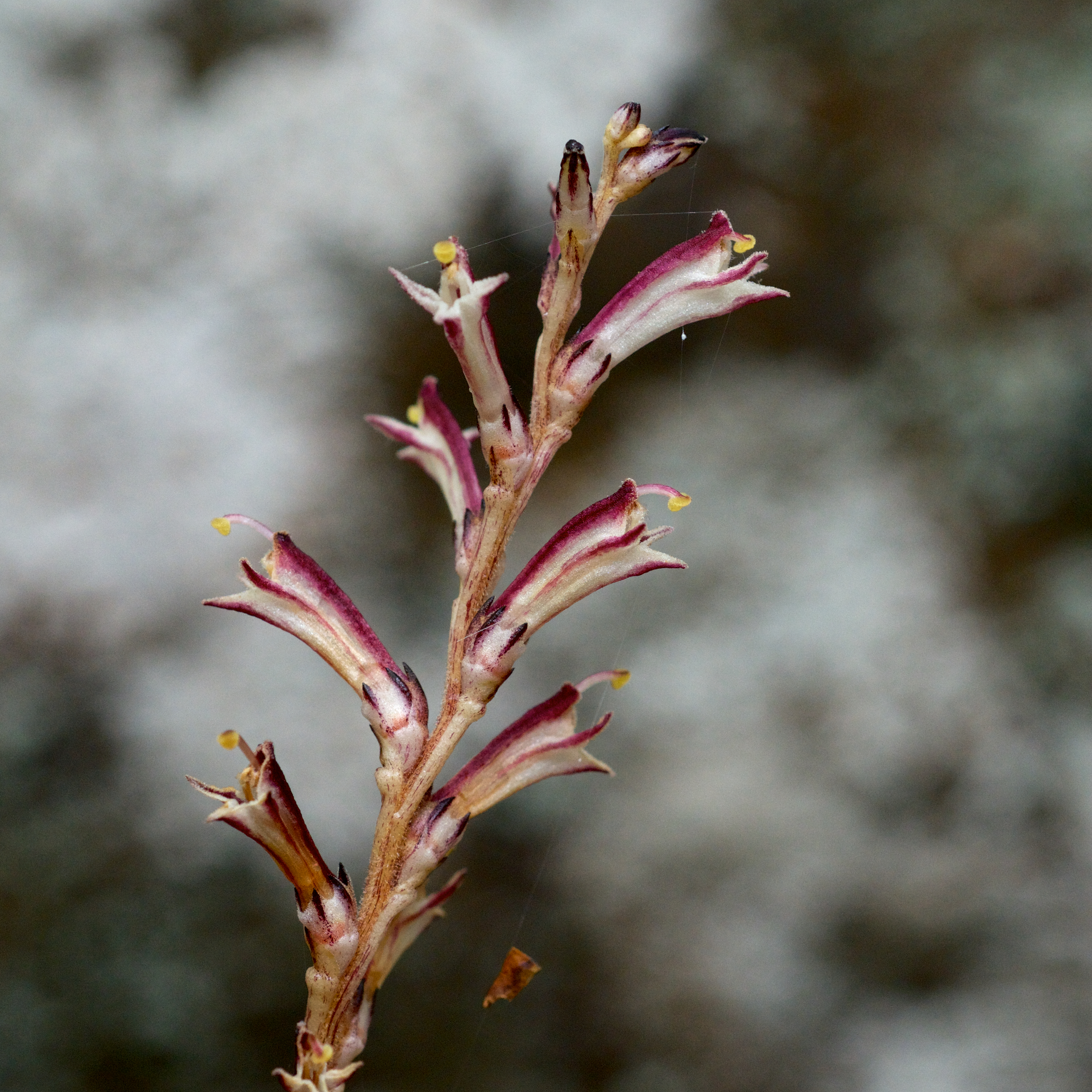

Scientific classification
- Kingdom: Plantae
- Clade: Tracheophytes
- Clade: Angiosperms
- Clade: Eudicots
- Clade: Asterids
- Order: Lamiales
- Family: Orobanchaceae
- Tribe: Orobancheae
- Genus: Epifagus; Nutt.
- Species: E. virginiana

Binomial name
- Epifagus virginiana (L.) Barton

Synonyms
- Epifagus americanus Nutt.; Leptamnium virginianum (L.) Raf.; Mylanche virginiana Wallr.

= Epifagus =

Genus of flowering plants in the broomrape family

Epifagus virginiana, commonly called beech drops (or beech-drops or beechdrops), is an obligate parasitic plant which grows and subsists on the roots of American beech. It is a member of the family Orobanchaceae. The genus Epifagus is monotypic—containing only E. virginiana. The name Epifagus derives from Greek "epi" meaning "on" or "upon", and "Fagus" which is the genus name of beech.

== Description ==
Beechdrops is a parasitic plant native to eastern North America. It entirely lacks chlorophyll and produces many brown stems up to 30 cm (12 in) tall on which it bears small white and purple flowers that appear in July through October. The flowers have tubular, zygomorphic corollas ~8 mm long containing a single style and four stamens. The dried flower stalks will persist throughout the winter. The flowers on the lower parts of the plant are cleistogamous (self-pollinating), while the tops of the stems have chasmogamous (cross-pollinating) flowers, which may be sterile.

Beechdrops contain very small alternate, scale-like leaves, which are a vestigial structure from an ancestor which was photosynthetic.

== Host and symptoms ==
Epifagus virginiana, also known as beechdrops, is an obligate parasite to Fagus grandifolia, beech trees. It has been found on maple trees, but it is believed this is a case of mistaken identity. E. virginiana grows off of the roots of its host but is not known to cause significant harm to the beech tree. Beechdrops grows on shallow roots at varying distances from the trunk of F. grandifolia. The roots of the host release a chemical that triggers the germination of E. virginiana. It is believed that the older the host tree, the more this chemical is released. The parasite develops a haustorium that grows into beech roots to draw nutrients from its host, as beechdrops does not photosynthesize. E. virginiana does not tolerate disturbances in its connection to F. grandifolia. As E. virginiana develops a tuber, the haustorium diminishes to the point that when E. virginiana has reached maturity, there is no visible haustorium, instead the parasite and host are connected through their roots and the beechdrops’ tuber.

== Life cycle ==
Epifagus virginiana germinates when a chemical signal is released from the beech tree’s roots. During early stages of development, beechdrops lives independently from its host, instead relying on nutrients from the seed. It may take several years for an above-ground structure to form. These early stages of E. virginiana are a few millimeters in size and butter yellow. Beechdrops then develops a haustorium that grows into the host’s roots. At maturity, the haustorium degrades and a tuber develops. During late summer and early fall, E. virginiana flowers. Beechdrops produces two types of flowers: chasmogamous and cleistogamous. Chasmogamous flowers are cross-pollinated flowers that grow at the top of the plant and are sometimes sterile. Cleistogamous flowers are self-fertile; these flowers grow at the base of the plant. Seeds from E. virginiana are small and are dispersed by rainwater. Between dispersal and germination, seeds experience a cellular change; the embryo changes colors and its cells develop granules.

== Environment ==
Epifagus virginiana’s host environment is mainly temperate forests in northeastern North America, including the Midwest of the U.S., and Canada. Beechdrops are found in Indiana, Ohio, and Michigan in significant numbers. They have been documented along the East Coast from Maine to South Carolina. E. virginiana is pollinated by Prenolepis imparis, the winter ant. This insect pollination is required for pollination in the chasmogamous flowers. E. virginiana relies upon ant pollination to produce cross pollinated seeds along with self-fertilized seed. It is not believed that ants pollinate the self-fertile cleistogamous flowers. Beechdrops are used to monitor forest health because of their dependence on their host and the sensitivity to its environment. E. virginiana’s host, beech trees, can advance in a forest faster than E. virginiana is able to. The presence of F. grandifolia is used to predict when E. virginiana will arrive in an area. E. virginiana is not a tree health concern but the lack of its presence is a sign that forest health is declining.
