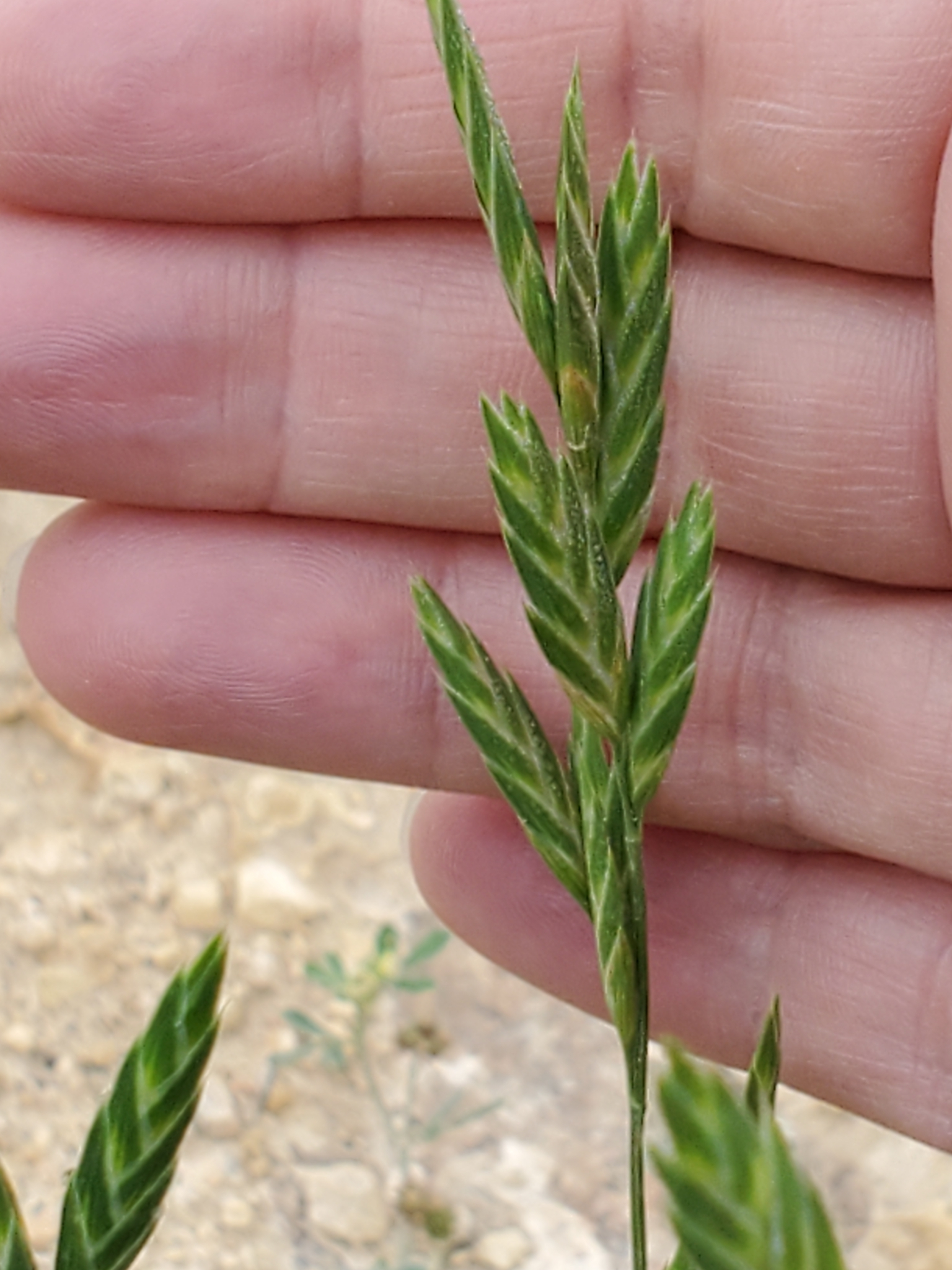
- Compact inflorescence

Scientific classification
- Kingdom: Plantae
- Clade: Embryophytes
- Clade: Tracheophytes
- Clade: Angiosperms
- Clade: Monocots
- Clade: Commelinids
- Order: Poales
- Family: Poaceae
- Subfamily: Pooideae
- Genus: Bromus
- Species: B. brevis

Binomial name
- Bromus brevis Steud.

Synonyms
- Ceratochloa brevis (Steud.) B.D.Jacks.; Bromus brevis festucarioides Covas & Millott; Bromus catharticus var. rupestris (Speg.) Planchuelo & P.M.Peterson; Bromus unioloides f. brevis (Steud.) Kloos; Bromus unioloides var. brevis (Steud.) Hack.; Bromus unioloides var. rupestris Speg.

= Bromus brevis =

Species of grass

Bromus brevis, is a species of brome grass endemic also known by the common names pampus brome (English), cebadilla pampeana and cebadilla de la sierra (Spanish - Argentina), and by the indigenous name lanku kachu (Ranquel). It was described by German botanist and zoologist Christian Gottfried Daniel Nees von Esenbeck in 1854 in Synopsis plantarum glumacearum.

It is endemic to central and southwest Argentina, and introduced and naturalised in New Zealand and Australia.

B. brevis is one of several species in the Bromus catharticus complex within the Bromus section Ceratochloa, all of which are hexaploids with the chromosome count 2n=42.

== Description ==
Bromus brevis is an annual to perennial grass with short, stiffly erect narrow, pubescent-leaved tufts, up to 30-75cm. It usually has short panicle inflorescences (8-15cm), born on erect culms. Spikelets are 1-2 cm, ovate-oblong, with light bicoloured yellowish-green florets. Lemmas are 7-9-nerved, with very short, silky, appressed hairs, and are awnless, mucronate, or have short awns (0.5-0.8mm).

The distribution of Bromus brevis overlaps entirely with Bromus catharticus. From that species, it can be distinguished by its compact spikelet borne on short pedicels (1.5-5 mm long), on erect panicles. Spikelets are 9-24 mm long, often have awnless or mucronate lemmas, or have awns shorter than 3 mm.

== Distribution ==
The native range of Bromus brevis in Argentina is in the political provinces Buenos Aires, Chubut, Córdoba, Entre Ríos, La Pampa, Mendoza, Neuquén, Río Negro, San Juan, San Luis, Santa Cruz and Tucumán. These states are found within the Pampean, Monte, and Patagonian biogeographical provinces.

B. brevis is also introduced and naturalised to the South Island of New Zealand and the Australian states of New South Wales, Tasmania, and Victoria. It is also listed as adventive in Europe, with records in the United Kingdom, Spain, Belgium, and Netherlands.

=== Naturalised area ===
In New Zealand, the oldest B. brevis record was collected in 1958 in Raggedy Range, Central Otago. It has since been found in Canterbury (near Amberley and Lincoln), and localised in Central Otago.

In Australia, B. brevis is found in the Northern, Central, and Southern Tablelands, as well as the North-Western and Central-Western Slopes, and in Eastern Tasmania.

== Habitat ==
Bromus brevis is a xeric plant (a plant that grows in dry habitats) from 0-2600 m.a.s.l, often found on sandy riverbanks and slopes. It is sometimes found on forest margins and permanent polyphytic meadows in the semi-arid Pampas and Puna grasslands.

In New Zealand, its habitat is described as roadsides and waste ground. Similarly, in Australia it is described as growing in disturbed areas, especially on granitic soils.

=== Associated species ===
B. brevis is recorded as codominant with Cynodon dactylon in alleyways within pear orchards in Patagonia.

In Bahia Blanca, Argentina, B. brevis grows in communities of Chañar (Geoffroea decorticans) treeland, with Medicago minima, Bromus hordeaceus, Hordeum murinum, Hordeum pusillum, and Lolium multiflorum.

== Biology ==
B. brevis is one of several species in the Bromus catharticus complex within the Bromus section Ceratochloa, all of which are hexaploids with the chromosome count 2n=42. A 1985 study produced an allodecaploid hybrid between B. catharticus and B. brevis, which had one basic, highly homologous genome, which formed up to 7 quadrivalents. This suggests that both species are allopolyploids.

=== Breeding system ===
Like most species in Bromus section Ceratochloa, B. brevis flowers both through chasmogamy (outcrossing through open flowers) and cleistogamy (self-pollinating through closed flowers), with each kind of flower existing on the same spikelet.

B. brevis maintains very high levels of fertility through selfing, with 91% of cleistogamous flowers producing seeds.

==== Phenology ====
B. brevis can be annual, biennial, or perennial depending on conditions. In Australia, it flowers from August to January.

In Buenos Aires, Argentina, B. brevis begins flowering chasmogamously before flowering cleistogamously. It flowers chasmogamously from September to October, and cleistogamously from October to early January.

== Ecology ==
Bromus brevis is an important pasture species in arid and semi arid areas of Argentina, primarily being eaten by cattle. It is a host of the fungi Ustilago bullata and the powdery mildew fungus Blumeria. It is a host of the Russian wheat aphid (Diuraphis noxia) and is eaten by the grasshoppers Dichroplus elongatus and Dichroplus maculipennis.

== Uses ==
Being a xeric grass, B. brevis is an important forage and fodder grass in arid and semi-arid regions of Argentina.

B. brevis was known as lanku kachu to the Ranquel indigenous people, who ate it raw, or used it to make a flour for thickening meat broth or to make into bread.

== Taxonomy ==
Bromus brevis was described by German botanist and zoologist Christian Gottfried Daniel Nees von Esenbeck in 1854 in Synopsis plantarum glumacearum, with no type specimens listed. The location listed is Mendoza, Argentina.

=== Type specimens ===
The type of one synonym of B. brevis (B. unioloides var. brevis) was listed as "Colonia Ruiz", near Villa de Rosario, in Córdoba Province, collected by Georg Hans Emmo Wolfgang Hieronymus in 1802.

==== Subspecific taxonomy ====
A segregate subspecies - B. brevis subsp. festucaroides was described in 1981, based on different forms of compression in anthers and caryopses. However, there is a whole range of forms between it and the type subspecies, so it is typically not recognised as distinct.

=== B. brevis as part of B. catharticus ===
B. brevis has at times been considered a variety or subspecies of B. catharticus. First in 1896, Carlo Luigi Spegazzini described Bromus unioloides var. rupestris, but noted that it has a very different appearance from Bromus unioloides (now called B. catharticus). Then, in 1904, Eduard Hackel described Bromus unioloides var. brevis.

==== Evidence for ====
These earlier positions were largely ignored until 1991, when Dr. Ana María Planchuelo attempted to define species boundaries within the Bromus catharticus complex of section Ceratochloa. She collected 16 morphological characteristics from 91 herbarium specimens of B. catharticus, B. brevis, B. bonariensis, and various varieties thereof, and analysed them phenetically. Based on the chosen characters, she found little differentiation between B. brevis and B. catharticus. In 1998, based on this paper. she reinstated Bromus unioloides var. rupestris under the updated name Bromus catharticus var. rupestris.

==== Evidence against ====
Evidence supporting the differentiation of the two species was published in a 1992 study (and a preceding doctoral thesis) by Dr. Carlos Naranjo. In these studies, he demonstrated using crossing experiments, phenetics, and chemotaxonomy that B. brevis and B. catharticus are distinct.

Despite some records in the wild, he found that hybrids were difficult to produce between B. brevis and B. catharticus, and had low fertility when successful. From four hybrids produced between the two species, only 2.8% of flowers produced mature seeds, and only one fertile seed was obtained, indicating extremely low fertility. Additionally, the pollen fertility rate was 7.9%. This was possibly due to structural differences in chromosomes or genetic sterility. Additionally, hybridism is unlikely to occur in the natural environment due to pre-fertilisation barriers:

1. Most flowers in both species are cleistogamous (self-pollinating), and;
2. Chasmogamous flowers were found to be temporally isolated between species.

Phenetic analysis, including 18 continuous and discrete characters, found that B. brevis was distinct from B. catharticus, but similar to B. parodii and B. bonariensis, a result shared by crossing and chemotaxonomic results.

A separate paper from 2015 sequenced the ndhF gene for 67 accessions of B. catharticus from throughout the Pampean Region, using B. brevis as a control. The result showed B. brevis as clearly a sister group to the B. catharticus accessions. However, the tree was not nested.

== Etymology ==
Bromus - from the Greek bromos (oat), out of broma (food).

brevis - Latin for short, referring to the short culms.

== Gallery ==
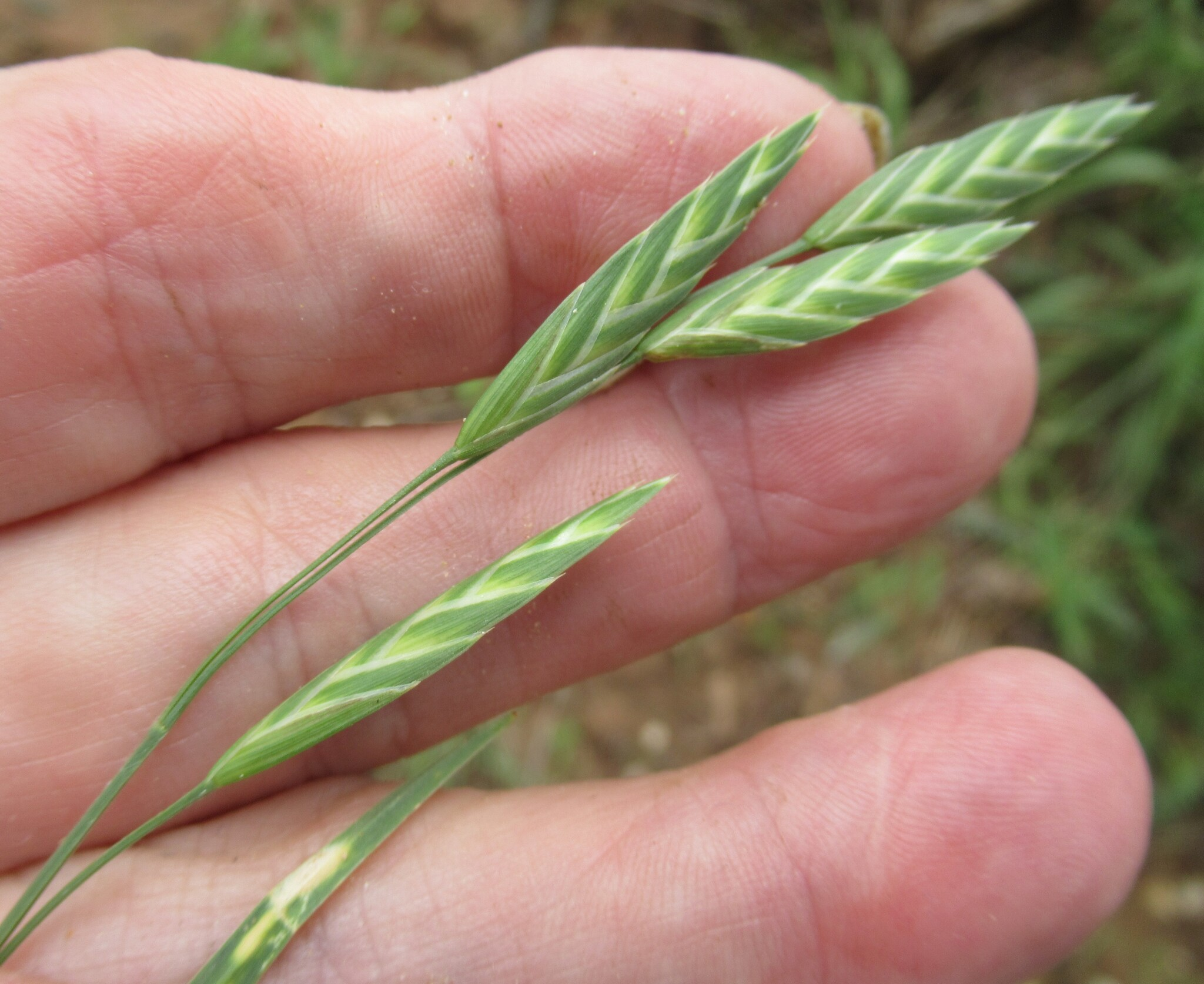
B. brevis compact inflorescence

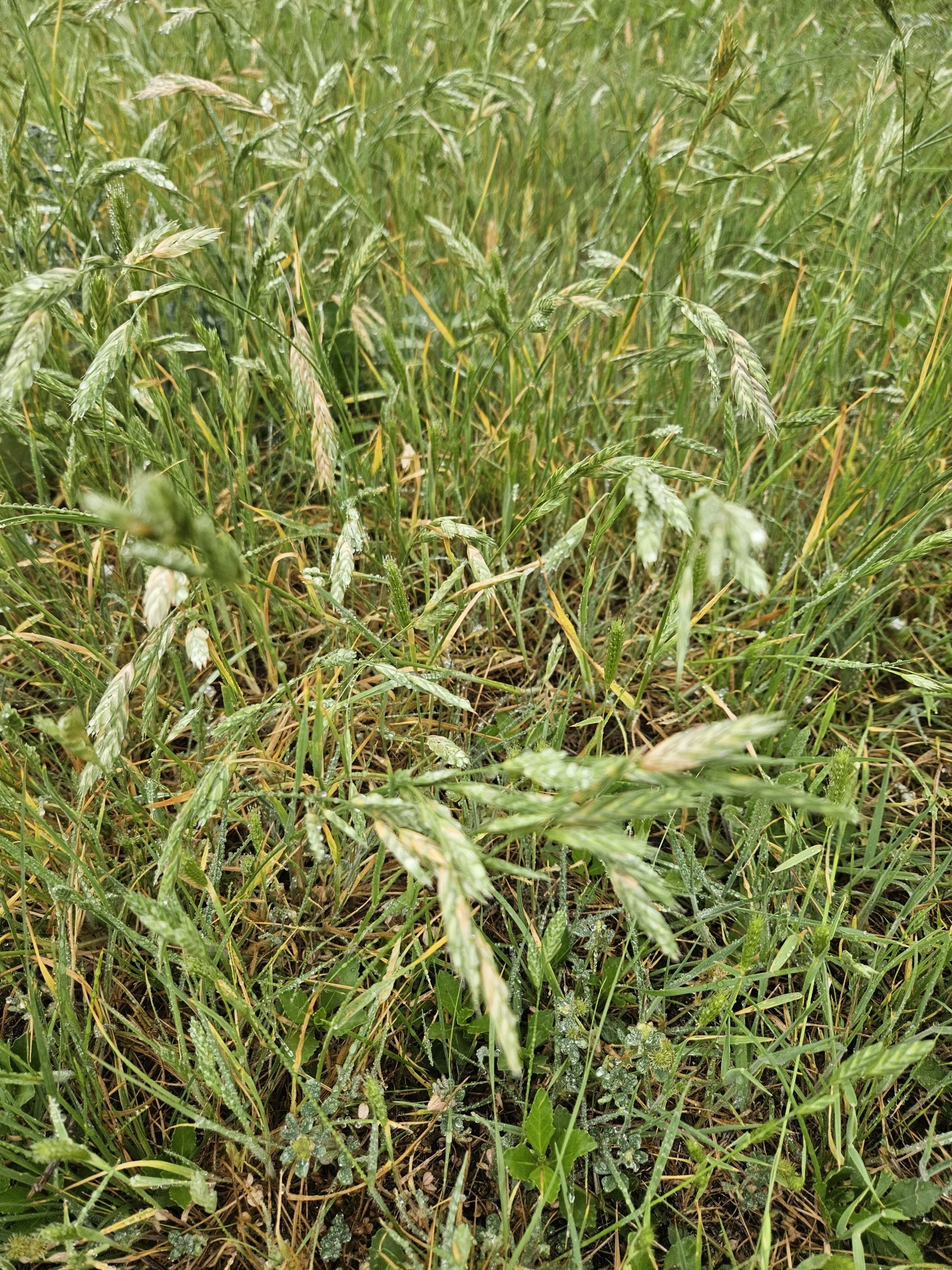
Sward of B. brevis

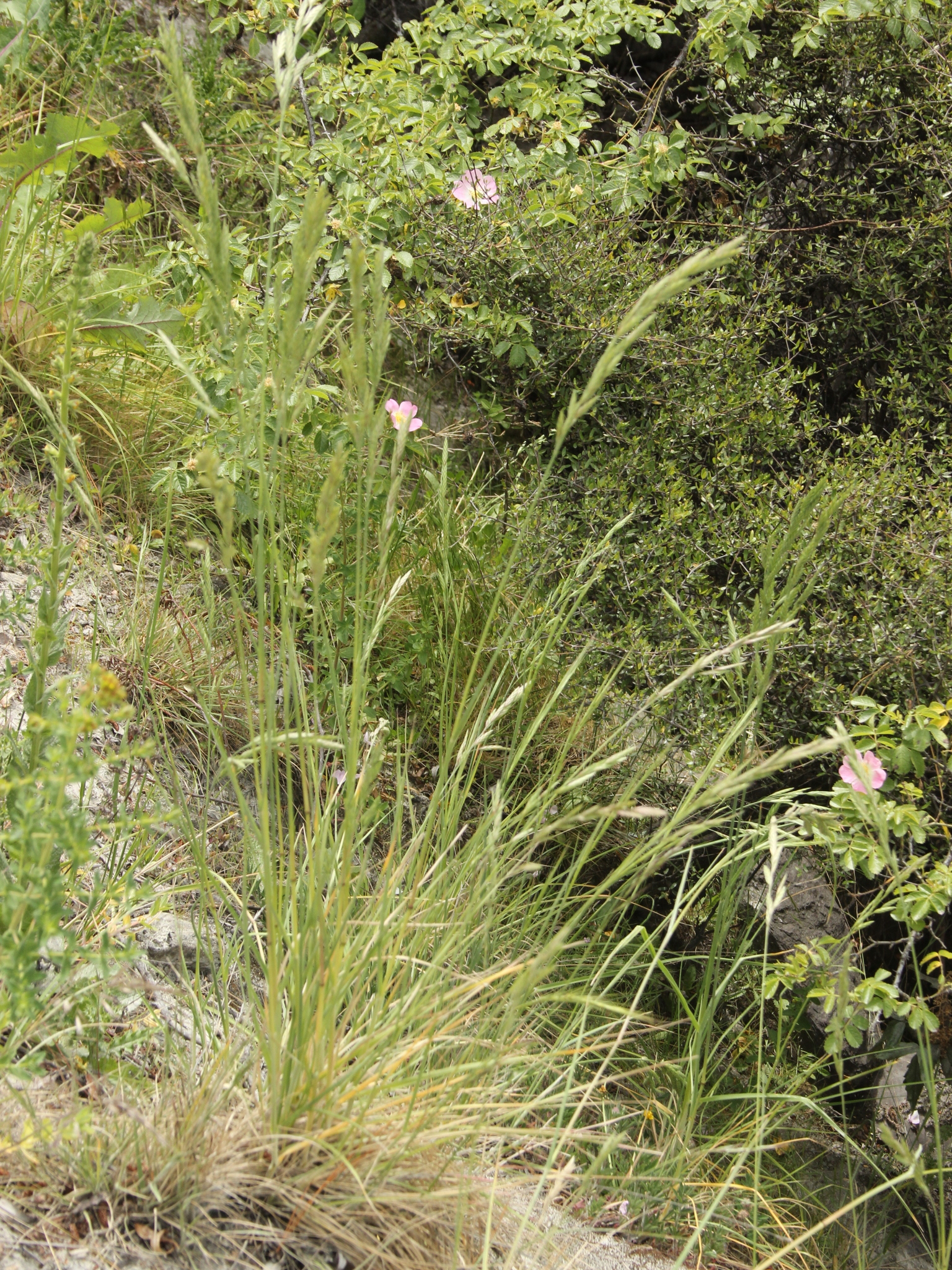
An unusually large-panicled B. brevis

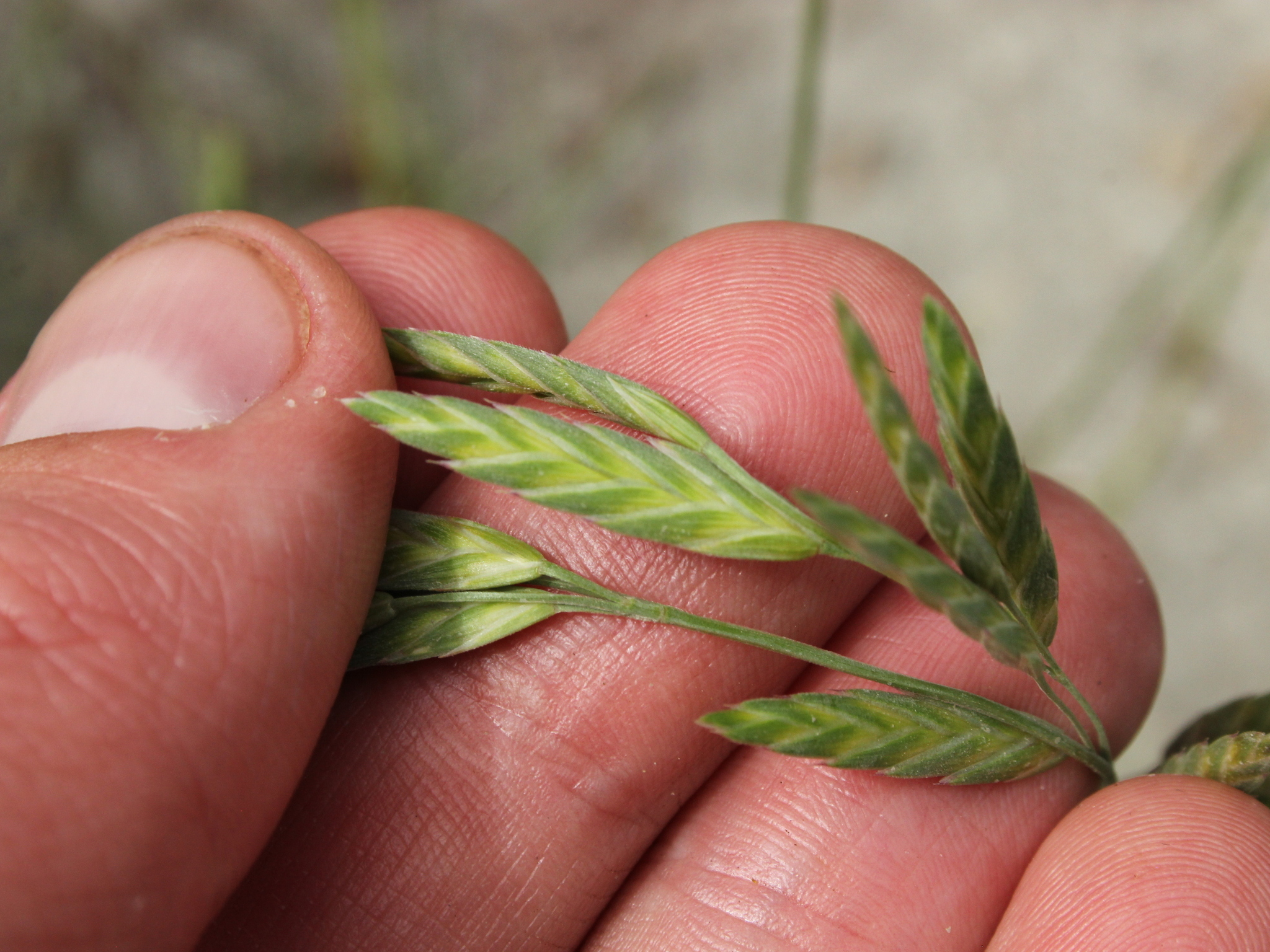
A B. brevis spikelet
