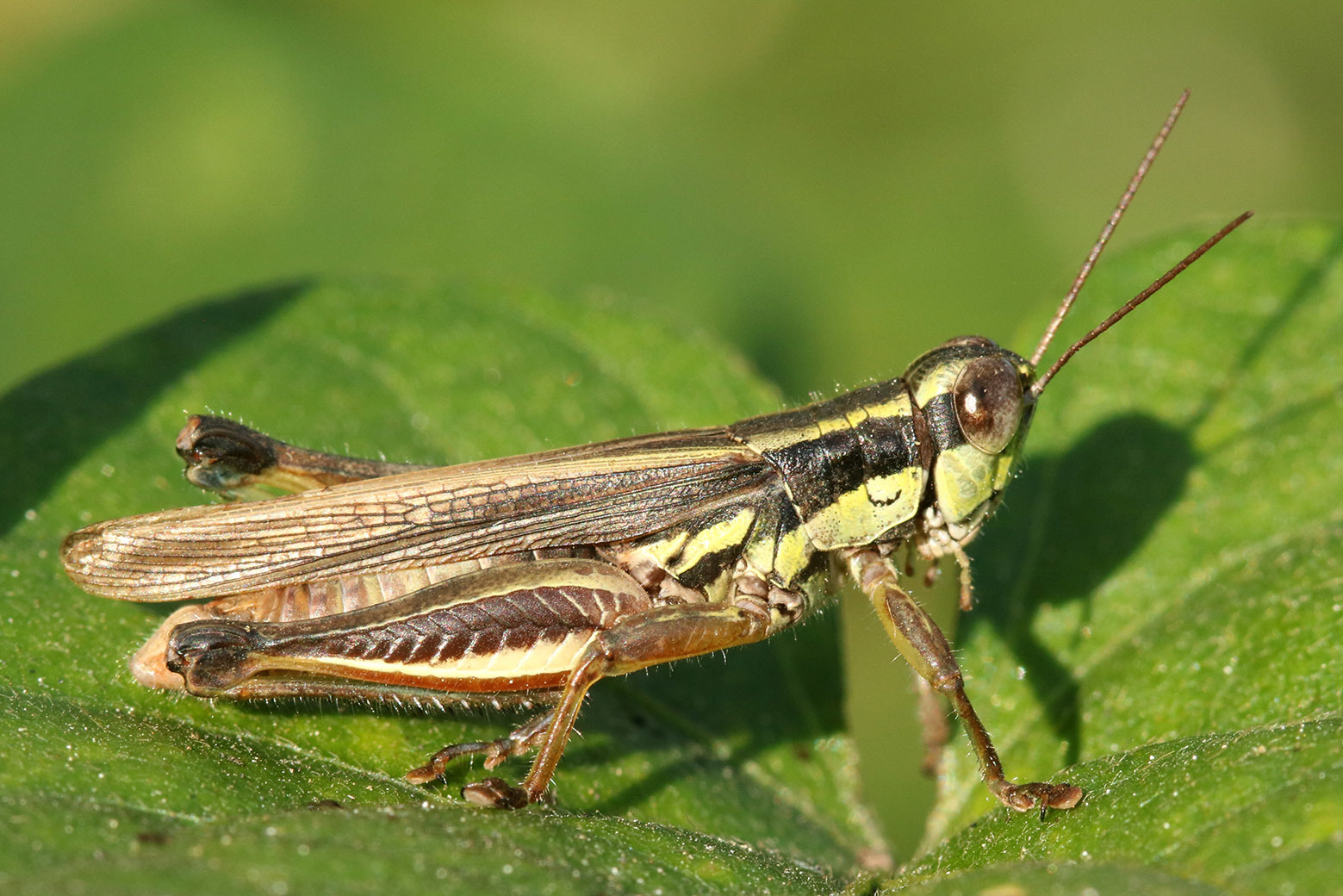
- Dichroplus elongatus, Argentina

Scientific classification
- Domain: Eukaryota
- Kingdom: Animalia
- Phylum: Arthropoda
- Class: Insecta
- Order: Orthoptera
- Suborder: Caelifera
- Family: Acrididae
- Subfamily: Melanoplinae
- Tribe: Dichroplini
- Genus: Dichroplus; Stål, 1873

= Dichroplus =

Genus of grasshoppers

Dichroplus is a genus of spur-throated grasshoppers in the family Acrididae. There are more than 20 described species in Dichroplus, found in North, Central, and South America.

== Species ==
These species belong to the genus Dichroplus:

- Dichroplus alejomesai Liebermann, 1967
- Dichroplus bruneri Liebermann, 1965
- Dichroplus cinereus Bruner, 1900
- Dichroplus conspersus Bruner, 1900
- Dichroplus democraticus (Blanchard, 1851)
- Dichroplus elongatus Giglio-Tos, 1894
- Dichroplus exilis Giglio-Tos, 1894
- Dichroplus fuscus (Thunberg, 1815)
- Dichroplus intermedius Ronderos, 1976
- Dichroplus maculipennis (Blanchard, 1851)
- Dichroplus mantiqueirae Ronderos, Carbonell & Mesa, 1968
- Dichroplus misionensis Carbonell, 1968
- Dichroplus notatus Bruner, L., 1908 (Mexican dichroplus)
- Dichroplus obscurus Bruner, 1900
- Dichroplus paraelongatus Carbonell, 1968
- Dichroplus patruelis (Stål, 1861)
- Dichroplus porteri Liebermann, 1943
- Dichroplus pratensis Bruner, 1900
- Dichroplus robustulus (Stål, 1878)
- Dichroplus schulzi Bruner, 1906
- Dichroplus silveiraguidoi Liebermann, 1956
- Dichroplus vittatus Bruner, 1900
- Dichroplus vittigerum (Blanchard, 1851)
