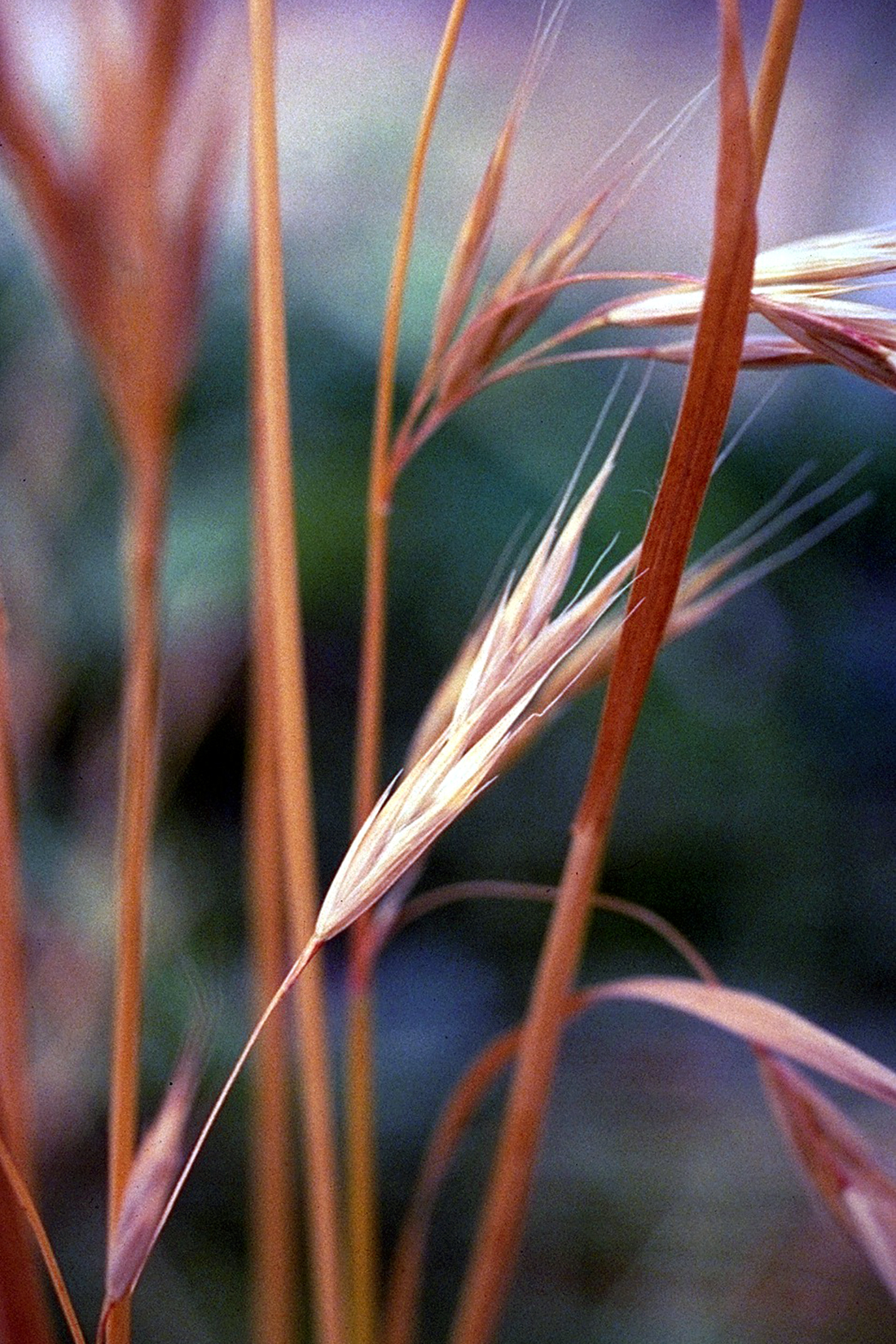

Scientific classification
- Kingdom: Plantae
- Clade: Embryophytes
- Clade: Tracheophytes
- Clade: Angiosperms
- Clade: Monocots
- Clade: Commelinids
- Order: Poales
- Family: Poaceae
- Subfamily: Pooideae
- Genus: Bromus
- Species: B. carinatus

Binomial name
- Bromus carinatus Hook. & Arn.

Synonyms
- Bromus compressus Lag.; Bromus nitens Nutt. ex A. Gray; Bromus oregonus Nutt. ex Hook. f.; Bromus oregonus Nutt. ex Shear; Bromus pendulinus Sessé ex Lag.; Bromus schaffneri (E. Fourn.) Scribn. & Merr.; Bromus virens Buckley; Ceratochloa carinata (Hook. & Arn.) Tutin; Ceratochloa grandiflora Hook.; Festuca pendulina Spreng.

= Bromus carinatus =

Species of flowering plant

Bromus carinatus is a species of brome grass known by the common names California brome and mountain brome.

== Description ==
Bromus carinatus is a perennial bunchgrass growing in clumps 0.5 to 1.5 metres (1 1/2 to 5 feet) tall, with many narrow leaves up to 40 centimetres (15 1/2 inches) long. The inflorescence is a spreading or drooping array of flat spikelets longer than they are wide.

The grass is wind-pollinated but is also sometimes cleistogamy, so that the flowers pollinate themselves, especially under stressful conditions. It also reproduces vegetatively via tillers.

The species is highly variable. It can be easily confused with B. catharticus and B. stamineus.

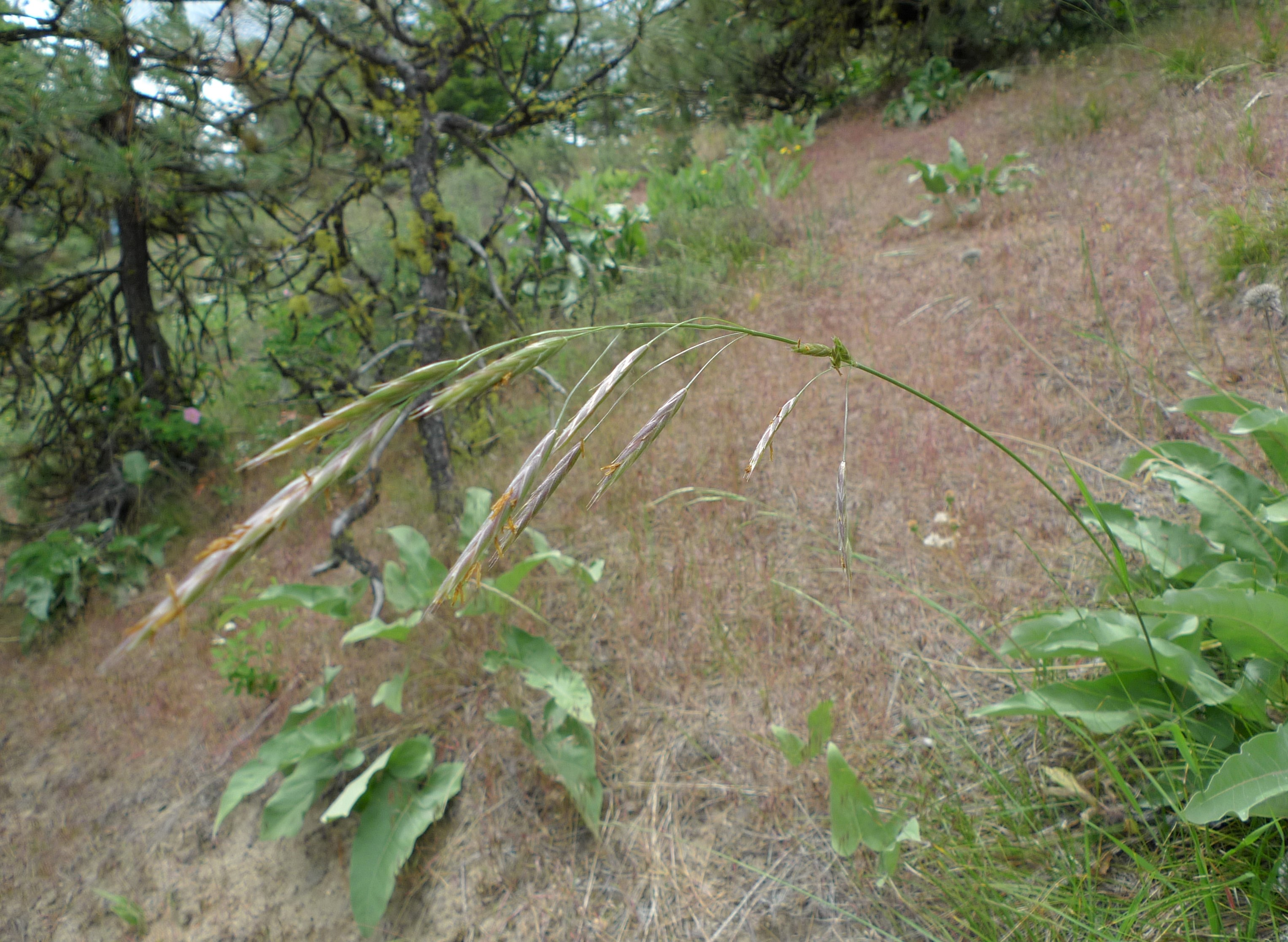
Bromus carinatus near Peshastin, Chelan County, Washington

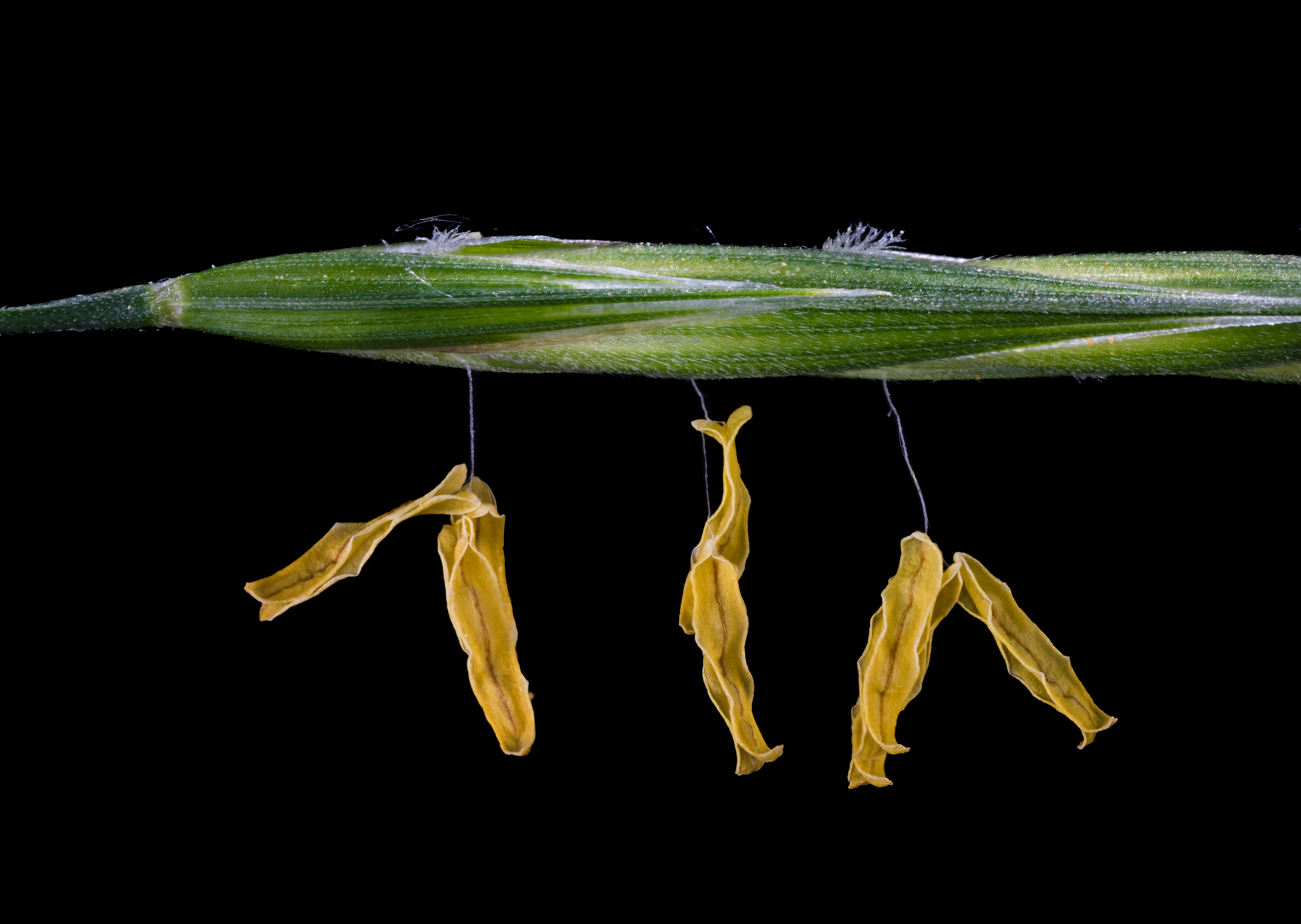
Bromus carinatus near in El Cerrito, California

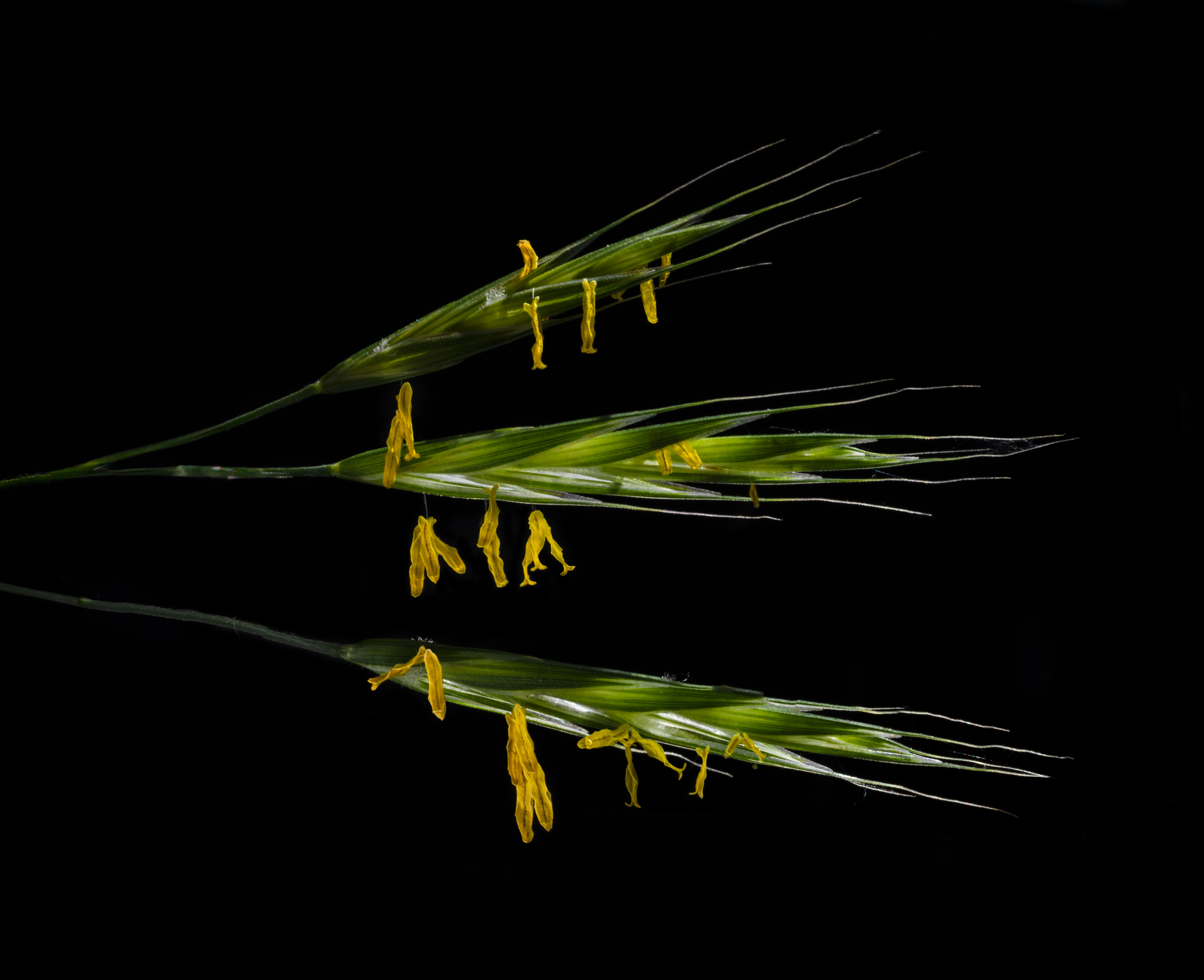
Bromus carinatus near in El Cerrito, California

== Distribution and habitat ==
It is native to western North America from Alaska to northern Mexico, where it can be found in many types of habitat. It is known in parts of the American midwest and eastern North America as an introduced species.

== Uses ==
This grass is used for control of erosion and revegetation of damaged land, as well as a highly palatable forage for livestock; however, it has the capacity to become a noxious weed in agricultural settings.
