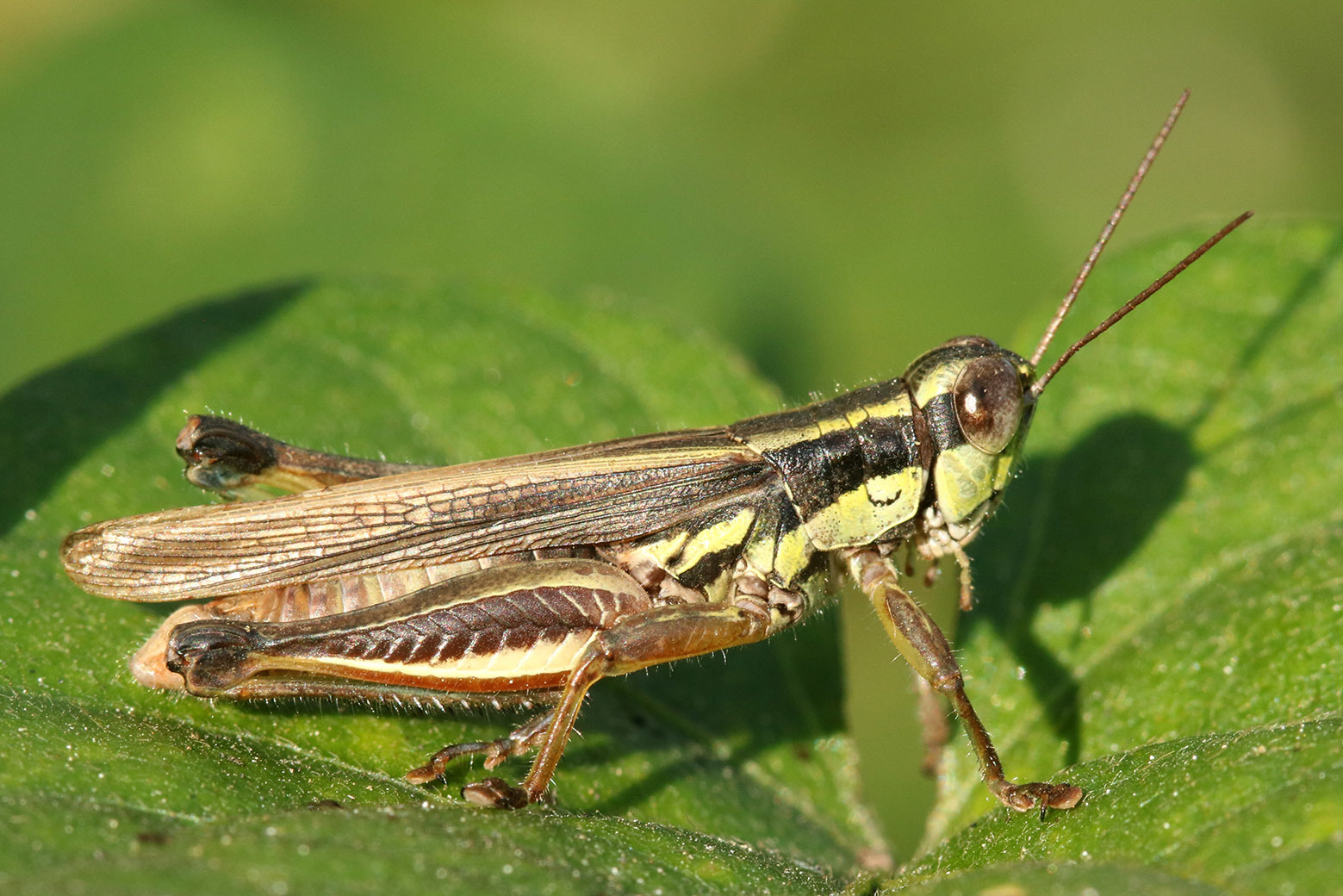
- Dichroplus elongatus, Argentina

Scientific classification
- Kingdom: Animalia
- Phylum: Arthropoda
- Clade: Pancrustacea
- Class: Insecta
- Order: Orthoptera
- Suborder: Caelifera
- Family: Acrididae
- Subfamily: Melanoplinae
- Tribe: Dichroplini
- Genus: Dichroplus
- Species: D. elongatus

Binomial name
- Dichroplus elongatus Giglio-Tos, 1894

= Dichroplus elongatus =

Species of grasshopper

Dichroplus elongatus is a species of spur-throated grasshopper in the family Acrididae. It is found in South America.
