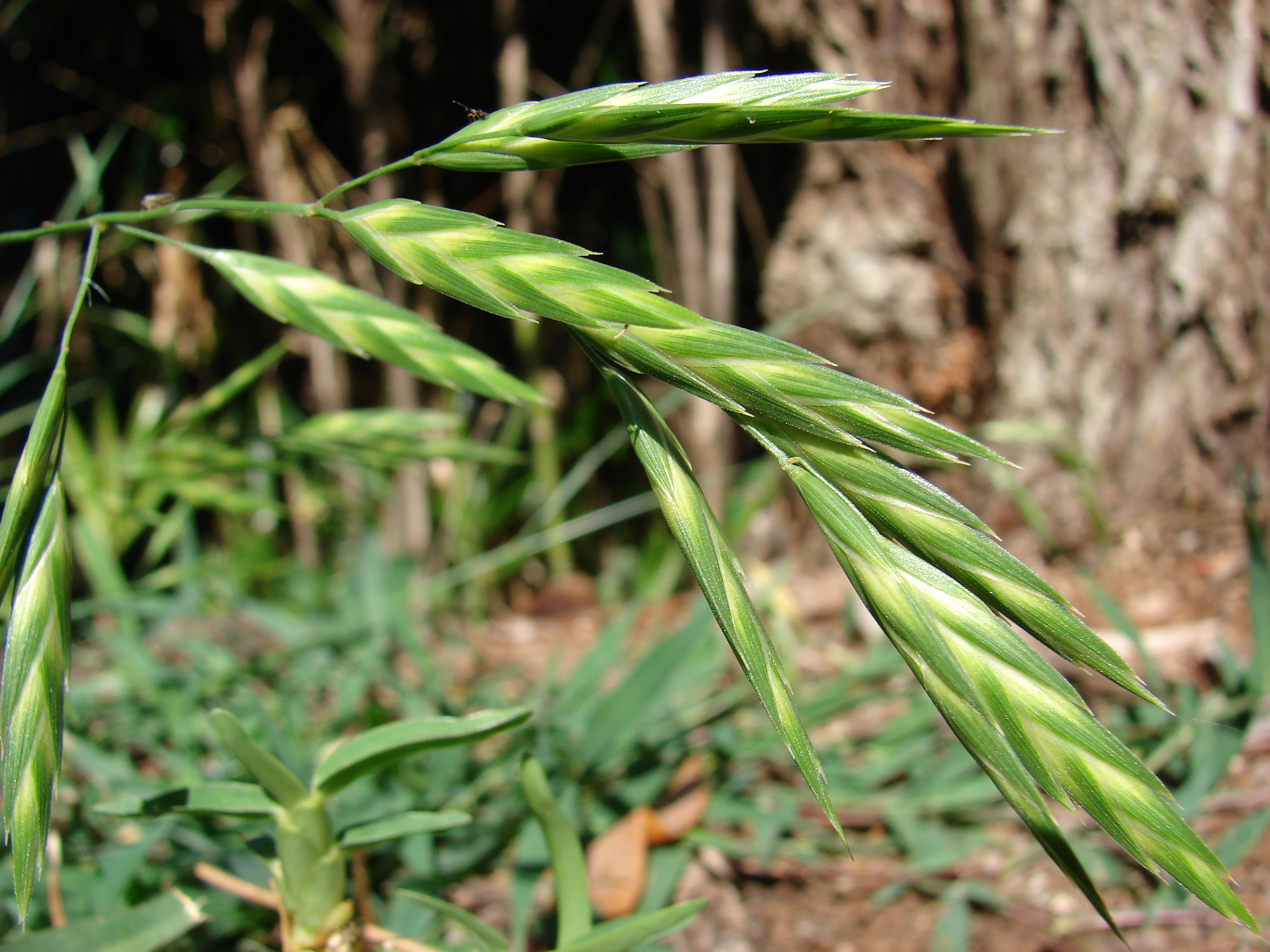

Scientific classification
- Kingdom: Plantae
- Clade: Tracheophytes
- Clade: Angiosperms
- Clade: Monocots
- Clade: Commelinids
- Order: Poales
- Family: Poaceae
- Subfamily: Pooideae
- Genus: Bromus
- Species: B. catharticus

Binomial name
- Bromus catharticus Vahl

Synonyms
- Bromus angustatus Pilg.; Bromus bolivianus Renvoize; Bromus breviaristatus (Hook.) Thurb. nom. illeg.; Bromus brongniartii Kunth; Bromus haenkeanus (J.Presl) Kunth; Bromus mathewsii Steud.; Bromus mucronatus Willd. ex Steud. nom. inval.; Bromus preslii Kunth; Bromus schraderi Kunth nom. illeg.; Bromus strictus Brongn. nom. illeg.; Bromus unioloides (Willd.) Kunth ex Raspail nom. illeg.; Bromus unioloides Kunth; Bromus willdenowii Kunth; Ceratochloa australis Spreng. ex Steud. nom. inval.; Ceratochloa breviaristata Hook.; Ceratochloa cathartica (Vahl) Herter; Ceratochloa festucoides P.Beauv. nom. inval.; Ceratochloa haenkeana J.Presl; Ceratochloa pendula Schrad.; Ceratochloa secunda J.Presl; Ceratochloa simplex Nees; Ceratochloa submutica Steud. [Spelling variant]; Ceratochloa unioloides (Willd.) P.Beauv.; Ceratochloa willdenowii (Kunth) W.A.Weber; Festuca quitensis Spreng. nom. illeg.; Festuca unioloides Willd.; Forasaccus breviaristatus (Hook.) Lunell; Schedonorus unioloides (Kunth) Roem. & Schult.; Serrafalcus unioloides (Kunth) Samp.; Tragus unioloides (Willd.) B.D.Jacks. nom. inval.; Zerna unioloides (Kunth) Lindm.

= Bromus catharticus =

Species of grass

Bromus catharticus is a species of brome grass known by the common names rescue grass (America), prairie grass (New Zealand), and Schrader's bromegrass in English, and cebadilla criolla and cebadilla in Spanish.

It is the most common and most well-known of several species in the Bromus catharticus complex within the Bromus section Ceratochloa, all of which are hexaploids with the chromosome count 2n=42.

It is native to South America but it can be found in other places, including Europe, Australia and North America, as an introduced species.

== Description ==
Bromus catharticus is a coarse winter annual or biennial grass, growing 0.2–1 m (7.9 in – 3 ft 3.4 in) in height. The culms of the grass are glabrous and 2–4 mm (0.079–0.157 in) thick. The sheaths are densely hairy. The grass lacks auricles and the glabrous ligule is 1–4 mm (0.039–0.157 in) long. The leaf blades are 4–30 cm (1.6–11.8 in) long and 3–10 mm (0.12–0.39 in) wide and are glabrous or pubescent. The erect or nodding panicles are 9–28 cm (3.5–11.0 in) long. The upper spikelets are erect and the lower spikelets are nodding or drooping. Each flat and pointed spikelet is 20–40 mm (0.79–1.57 in) long and has four to twelve florets. The glumes are smooth or occasionally slightly scabrous. The lower glume is fie to seven-veined and 7–12 mm (0.28–0.47 in) long, and the upper glume is seven to nine-veined and 9–17 mm (0.35–0.67 in) long. The lemmas are scabrous or nearly glabrous and lack awns or possess very short awns 2 mm (0.079 in) in length. The lemmas are 11–20 mm (0.43–0.79 in) long. The palea is over half the length of the lemma. The anthers are 0.5–5 mm (0.020–0.197 in) long.

Bromus catharticus is part of Bromus section Ceratochloa, which are separated from other Bromus sections by their strongly keeled (folded, like the keel of a boat) lemmas, which make the spikelets laterally-compressed.

=== Similar species ===
B. catharticus is likely to be confused with B. cebadilla, B. brevis, and possibly the B. carinatus group.

B. cebadilla has often been reduced to a synonym of B. catharticus (Bromus catharticus var. elatus). However, it can be distinguished by its wide spikelets, scabrid or glabrous rather than lightly hairy glumes, and shorter awns (0-3.5mm rather than 3.5-9mm).

Like B. cebadilla, B. brevis was once regarded a synonym of B. catharticus (Bromus catharticus var. rupestris). It can be distinguished by its longer awns (B. brevis awns are always shorter than 1mm, if present), longer pedicels, and less compact panicle.

From the B. carinatus group, B. catharticus can be distinguished by its wider spikelets, and its having 9-11 veins on its lemmas rather than 7.

== Distribution ==
Bromus catharticus is native to most of South America (Venezuela, Brazil, Bolivia, Colombia, Ecuador, Peru, Argentina, Chile, Paraguay, and Uruguay).

It is widely introduced and naturalised in:

- Africa (Algeria, Egypt, Ethiopia, Lesotho, Morrocco, Namibia, South Africa, Tunisia, and Zimbabwe)
- Australasian (Australia, New Caledonia, and New Zealand)
- Asia (Azerbaijan, Bhutan, China, Cyprus, Georgia, India, Indonesia, Iran, Israel, Japan, Jordan, North and South Korea, Nepal, Pakistan, Saudi Arabia, Russia, Sri Lanka, Syria, and Taiwan)
- Caribbean (the Dominican Republic, Jamaica, Haiti, and Trinidad and Tobago)
- Central America (Costa Rica, El Salvador, Guatemala, and Panama)
- Europe (Austria, Belgium, Croatia, Great Britain, France, Germany, Greece, Italy, Switzerland, Russia, and Ukraine)
- and North America (Canada, Mexico, and the United States (including Hawaii)

== Habitat ==
Bromus catharticus grows in open and disturbed areas, such as roadsides, parks, gardens, orchards, vineyards, ditches. In Australia, it can additionally be found in some natural habitats, such as coastal vegetation, heathlands, grasslands, grassy woodlands, open woodlands, and riparian.

== Biology ==
Like most species in Bromus section Ceratochloa, B. catharticus flowers both through chasmogamy (outcrossing through open flowers) and cleistogamy (self-pollinating through closed flowers), with each kind of flower existing on the same spikelet. Chasmogamous flowering is induced by short photoperiod and high soil moisture. In Argentina, B. catharticus flowers cleistogamously before flowering chasmogamously.

B. catharticus naturally spreads through attachment to animals. However, it is often spread through contaminated agricultural produce (such as fodder, wool, and seed), or through attachment to vehicles, clothing, or equipment. It can produce an average of 1000 seeds/m^{2}, which can remain viable in the soil for up to three years.

In Australia, B. catharticus flowers in Spring and Summer, and seeds germinate from Autumn to Spring.

== Uses ==
Bromus catharticus is commonly used as a pasture grass in areas with warm and temperate climate.

== Etymology ==
Bromus - from the Greek bromos (oat), out of broma (food).

catharticus - from the Latin catharticus, meaning to purge. This refers to the plant having emetic properties.
