= Pentapogon =

Scientific classification
- Kingdom: Plantae
- Clade: Tracheophytes
- Clade: Angiosperms
- Clade: Monocots
- Clade: Commelinids
- Order: Poales
- Family: Poaceae
- Subfamily: Pooideae
- Supertribe: Poodae
- Tribe: Poeae
- Subtribe: Echinopogoninae
- Genus: Pentapogon; R.Br.
- Species: P. quadrifidus

Binomial name
- Pentapogon quadrifidus (Labill.) Baill.

Synonyms
- Agrostis quadrifida Labill.; Pentapogon billardieri R.Br.; Stipa pentapogon F.Muell.; Pentapogon billardierei var. parviflorus Benth.; Pentapogon quadrifidus var. parviflorus (Benth.) D.I.Morris

Genus of grasses

Pentapogon is a genus of Australian plants in the grass family. The only known species is Pentapogon quadrifidus. It is native to every Australian State except Queensland, and is also naturalised on the South Island of New Zealand. (A former Pentapogon species, Pentapogon drummondii, is now placed in Calamagrostis as Calamagrostis drummondii.)
