= Chasmogamy =

Flowers with exposed reproductive parts

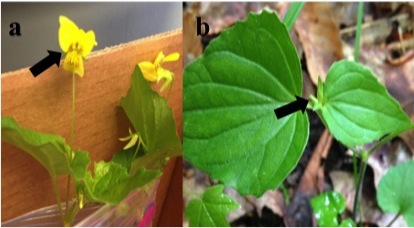
Chasmogamous (a) and cleistogamous (b) flowers of Viola pubescens. Arrows point to structure.

Chasmogamy is the type of plant reproduction in which the flowers open up, enabling cross-pollination. This is in contrast to cleistogamy, in which the flowers stay closed and self-pollinate.

Chasmogamous flowers are commonly showy with open petals encircling exposed reproductive parts. Chasmogamous stems from Greek for "open marriage", named after the open arrangement of floral structures. Once chasmogamous flowers have reached maturity, they unfurl and their stamens or style are made available for pollination. Although some plant species possess self-fertilizing chasmogamous flowers, most chasmogamous flowers are cross-pollinated by biotic (e.g. insects) or abiotic (e.g. wind) agents.

Chasmogamous flowers that are cross-pollinated have the advantage of sexual reproduction between two different parents, resulting in sexual recombination and genetically distinct seeds. These distinct seeds increase genetic diversity of the plant population and reduce inbreeding depression and deleterious alleles. Seeds produced by chasmogamous flowers that are cross-pollinated may also exhibit hybrid vigor (heterosis) and increased fitness.

To promote cross-pollination, chasmogamous flowers often have strikingly colored petals and nectar guides or nectaries to attract and reward pollinators. However, these attractive floral organs can be disadvantageous as they are energetically costly to produce and require a surplus of resources. Pollination of chasmogamous flowers is also dependent upon the availability of pollinating agents. Thus, chasmogamous flowers generally develop when resources like light, water, nutrients, and pollinators are high.

In contrast to chasmogamous flowers are minute, bud-like cleistogamous ("closed marriage") flowers, and pollination of cleistogamous flowers is cleistogamy. Unlike chasmogamous flowers, cleistogamous flowers remain mechanically sealed throughout the entirety of their development and reproduction. The closed morphology of cleistogamous flowers hinders them from exposing their reproductive organs and forces self-pollination. Without the need for pollinating agents, cleistogamous flowers lack nectar and elaborate petals, making them much less costly to produce than chasmogamous flowers and developmentally favored in suboptimal conditions.

In addition to chasmogamy and cleistogamy, many plant species possess a mixed breeding system that utilizes both chasmogamous and cleistogamous flowers. This breeding system has been referred to under multiple names including true cleistogamy, dimorphic cleistogamy, and the chasmogamous/cleistogamous mixed breeding system. In this mixed breeding system, species produce both chasmogamous and cleistogamous flowers on the same plant. Chasmogamous and cleistogamous flowers may exhibit spatial separation and develop simultaneously at different morphological locations, or the two flowers may be temporally separated and develop at different times during the flowering season. Rarely, the two flowers have also been documented as being both spatially and temporally separated. The presence of both flower types allows mixed breeding system species to cross-pollinate and self-fertilize. This leads to increases in genetic diversity and assures reproductive success in variable environmental and pollinator conditions.

== See also ==
- Cleistogamy
