= Cleistogamy =

Self-pollination of non-opening flowers

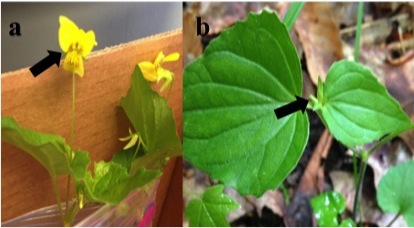
Chasmogamous (a) and cleistogamous (b) flowers of Viola pubescens. Arrows point to structure.

Cleistogamy is a type of automatic self-pollination of certain plants that can propagate by using non-opening, self-pollinating flowers. Especially well known in peanuts, peas, and pansies, this behavior is most widespread in the grass family. However, the largest genus of cleistogamous plants is Viola. Cleistogamy is promoted in the tomato plant by a modification of floral structures. This modification includes formation of a stigma enclosing floral structure.

The more common opposite of cleistogamy, or "closed marriage", is called chasmogamy, or "open marriage". Virtually all plants that produce cleistogamous flowers also produce chasmogamous ones. The principal advantage of cleistogamy is that it requires fewer plant resources to produce seeds than does chasmogamy, because development of petals, nectar and large amounts of pollen is not required. This efficiency makes cleistogamy particularly useful for seed production on unfavorable sites or adverse conditions. Impatiens capensis, for example, has been observed to produce only cleistogamous flowers after being severely damaged by grazing and to maintain populations on unfavorable sites with only cleistogamous flowers. The obvious disadvantage of cleistogamy is that self-fertilization occurs, which may suppress the creation of genetically more fit plants. Another disadvantage of self-fertilization is that it leads to the expression in progeny of deleterious recessive mutations.

For genetically modified (GM) rapeseed, researchers hoping to minimise the admixture of GM and non-GM crops are attempting to use cleistogamy to prevent gene flow. However, preliminary results from Co-Extra, a project within the seventh EU research program in 2011, show that although cleistogamy reduces gene flow, it is not at the moment a consistently reliable tool for biocontainment; due to a certain instability of the cleistogamous trait, some flowers may open and release genetically modified pollen.

== See also ==
- Co-existence of genetically modified, conventional, and organic crops
