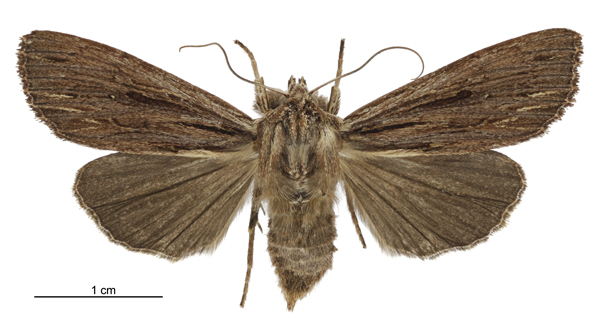
- Female
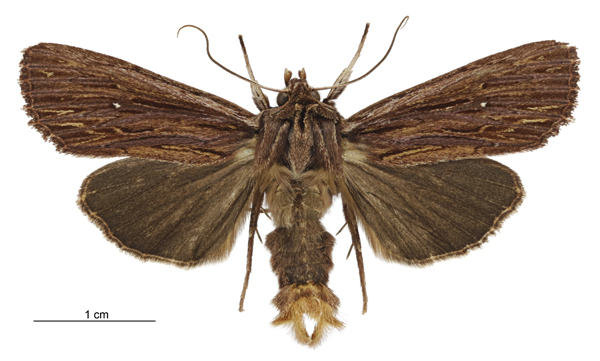
- Male

Scientific classification
- Kingdom: Animalia
- Phylum: Arthropoda
- Clade: Pancrustacea
- Class: Insecta
- Order: Lepidoptera
- Superfamily: Noctuoidea
- Family: Noctuidae
- Genus: Ichneutica
- Species: I. steropastis

Binomial name
- Ichneutica steropastis (Meyrick, 1887)

Synonyms
- Mamestra steropastis Meyrick, 1887; Persectania steropastis (Meyrick, 1887); Tmetolophota steropastis (Meyrick, 1887)

= Ichneutica steropastis =

Species of moth endemic to New Zealand

Ichneutica steropastis, or the flax notcher moth, is a species of moth in the family Noctuidae. It is endemic to New Zealand and can be found throughout the country from the Three Kings Islands to Stewart Island as well as in the Chatham Islands. The larvae of this species feed on a variety of native and introduced plants however the New Zealand flax is one of the more well known host plants for the larvae of this moth. The larvae are nocturnal, hiding away in the base of the plants and coming out to feed at night. They create a distinctive notch in the leaf when they feed. The adults of this species are on the wing from October to March. Although adult specimens of I. steropastis are relatively easy to recognise they might possibly be confused with I. inscripta, I. theobroma or with darker forms of I. arotis. However I. steropastis can be distinguished as it has a long dark basal forewing streak that these three species lack.

== Taxonomy ==
This species was first described by Edward Meyrick in 1887 as Mamestra steropastis using specimens collected in Napier, Blenheim and Christchurch by R.W. Fereday. In 1988 J. S. Dugdale placed this species within the Tmetolophota genus. In 2019 Robert Hoare undertook a major review of New Zealand Noctuidae. During this review the genus Ichneutica was greatly expanded and the genus Tmetolophota was subsumed into that genus as a synonym. As a result of this review, this species is now known as Ichneutica steropastis. The male lectotype specimen is held at the Natural History Museum, London.

== Description ==
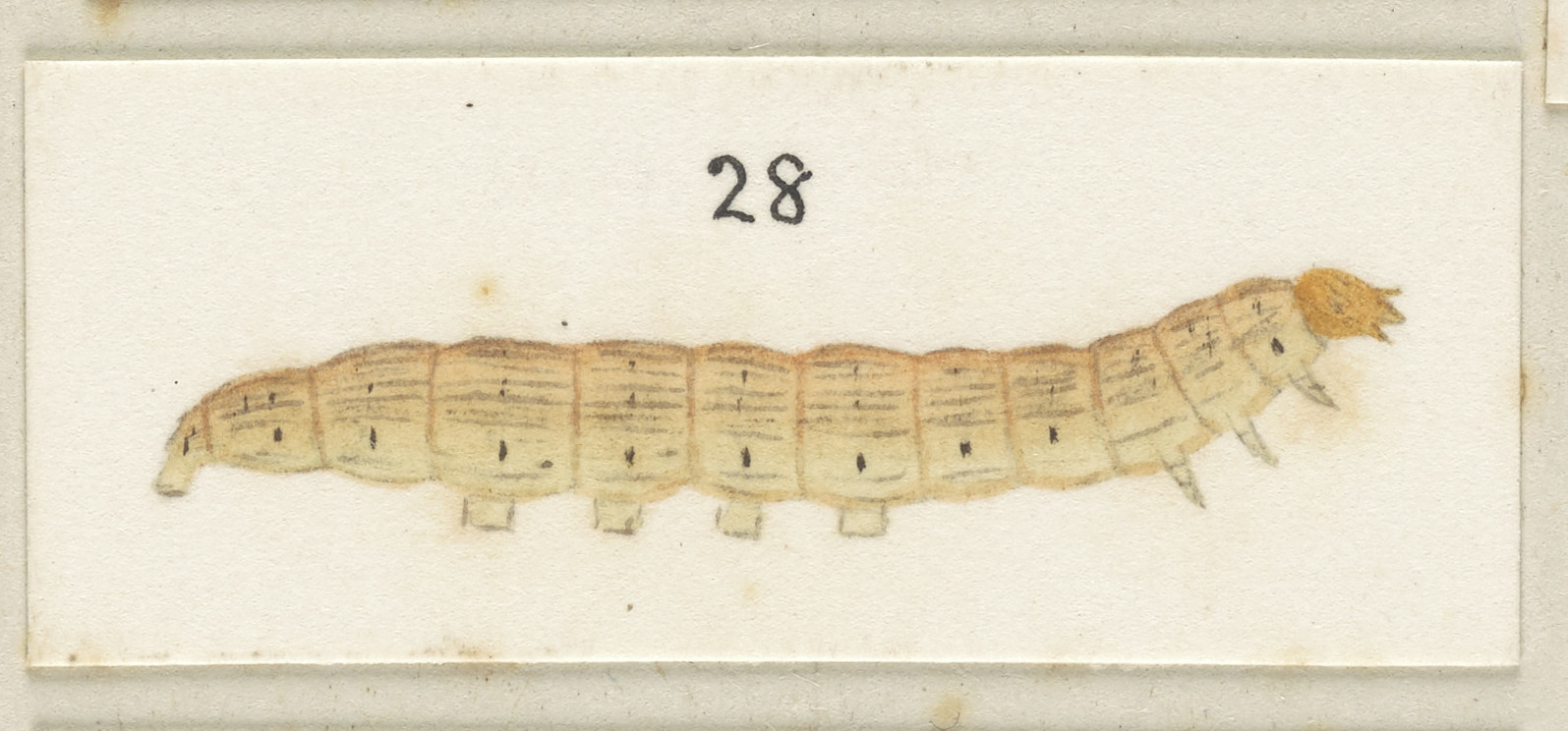
Hudson's drawing of the larva of I. steropastis

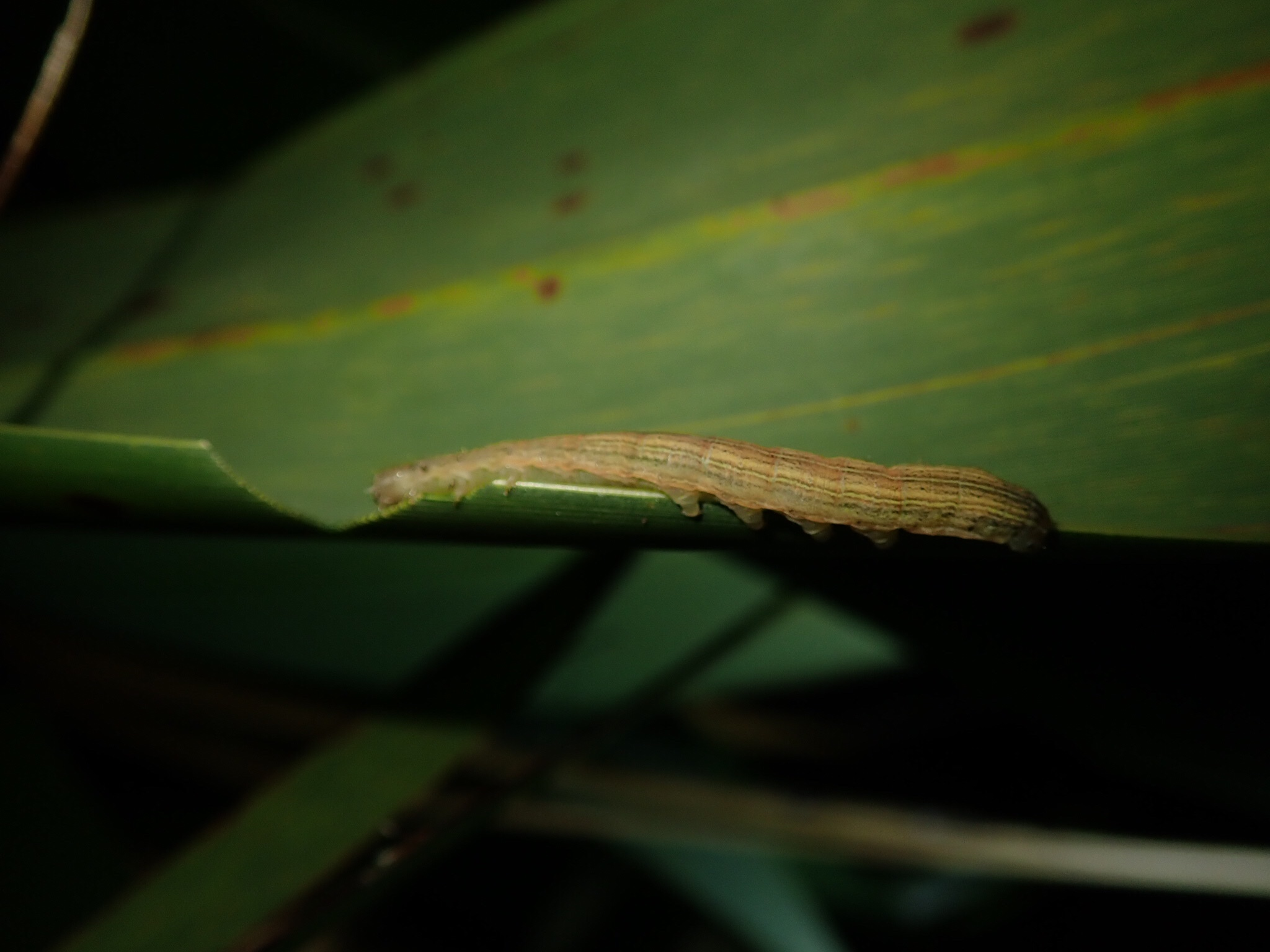
Larva of I. steropastis

George Hudson described the larva of this species as follows:

About 1 1/2 inches in length, of almost uniform thickness, considerably flattened; the head is ochreous, the body very pale ochreous-brown; there are no distinct markings on the thoracic segments, except a few minute black dots round the middle of each; the rest of the body is covered with a number of very fine blackish lines, which become darker posteriorly, and are stronger on the dorsal and lateral regions; there is a row of minute black dots round the middle of each segment; the spiracles are black and the underside of the larva is faintly tinged with green.

The host plant is not a reliable guide to confirm the identification of this species as larvae of both I. arotis and I. blenheimensis also feed on similar hosts including flax species. The larvae of I. steropastis can be distinguished from I. arotis as there are differences in the placement of the P1 head capsule and the anal shield has a minute double mound between the D2 setae which is lacking in I. arotis.

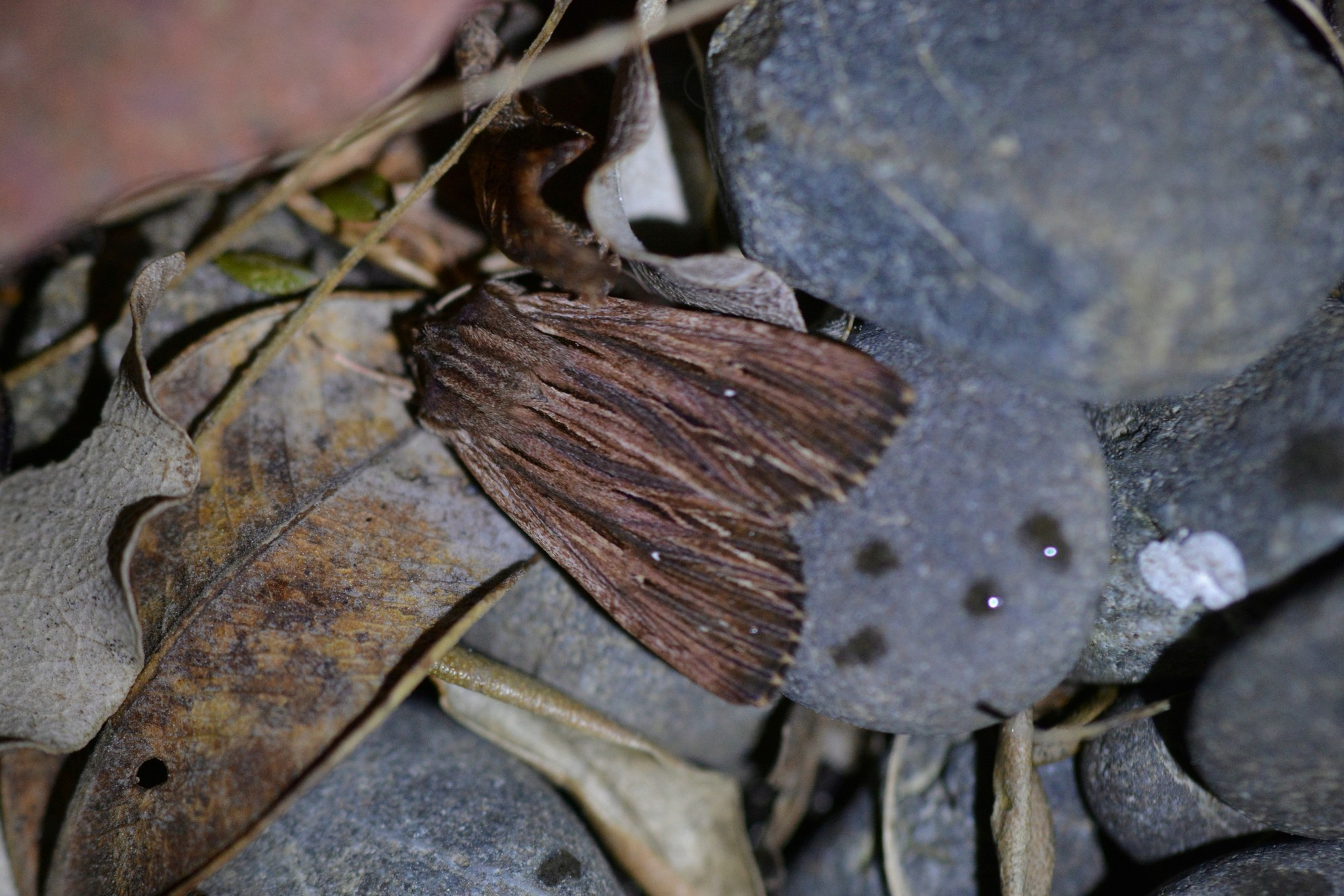
Observation of live I. steropastis

Meyrick described the adults of this species as follows:

Male, female. — 40-43 mm. Head ochreous, mixed with whitish, and irregularly marked with dark reddish-fuscous. Palpi dark reddish-fuscous, mixed with whitish. Antennae fuscous, in male subdentate, rather shortly ciliated. Thorax with moderately large double anterior and small posterior crest; reddish-fuscous, with a black posteriorly whitish-margined anterior line; patagia with two black internally whitish-margined streaks on each. Abdomen grey, and tuft pale reddish-ochreous. Legs ochreous-whitish, mixed with reddish-fuscous. Forewings moderately dilated, costa hardly arched, apex obtuse, hindmargin crenulate, obliquely rounded; reddish-fuscous; veins dark fuscous, margined with whitish or ochreous-whitish; a short black median streak from base; a slender dark reddish-fuscous longitudinal streak in disc from above apex of this to 3/5, posterior extremity somewhat dilated; a minute white discal dot near beyond its extremity; a very oblique short blackish streak from inner margin near base; second line hardly indicated; subterminal hardly traceable except by two very long whitish dentations touching hind-margin below middle : cilia reddish-fuscous, slenderly barred with whitish. Hindwings dark grey; cilia white or ochreous-whitish, with a grey line.

The adult male of this species has a wingspan of between 32.5 and 45.5 mm and the female has a wingspan of between 33 and 45 mm. Although I. steropastis is relatively easily recognisable it might possibly be confused with I. inscripta, I. theobroma or with darker forms of I. arotis. However I. steropastis has long dark basal forewing streak that these other three species lack.

== Distribution ==
I. steropastis is endemic to New Zealand. It is common and can be found throughout the country from the Three Kings Islands to Stewart Island as well as in the Chatham Islands.

== Habitat and host plant ==
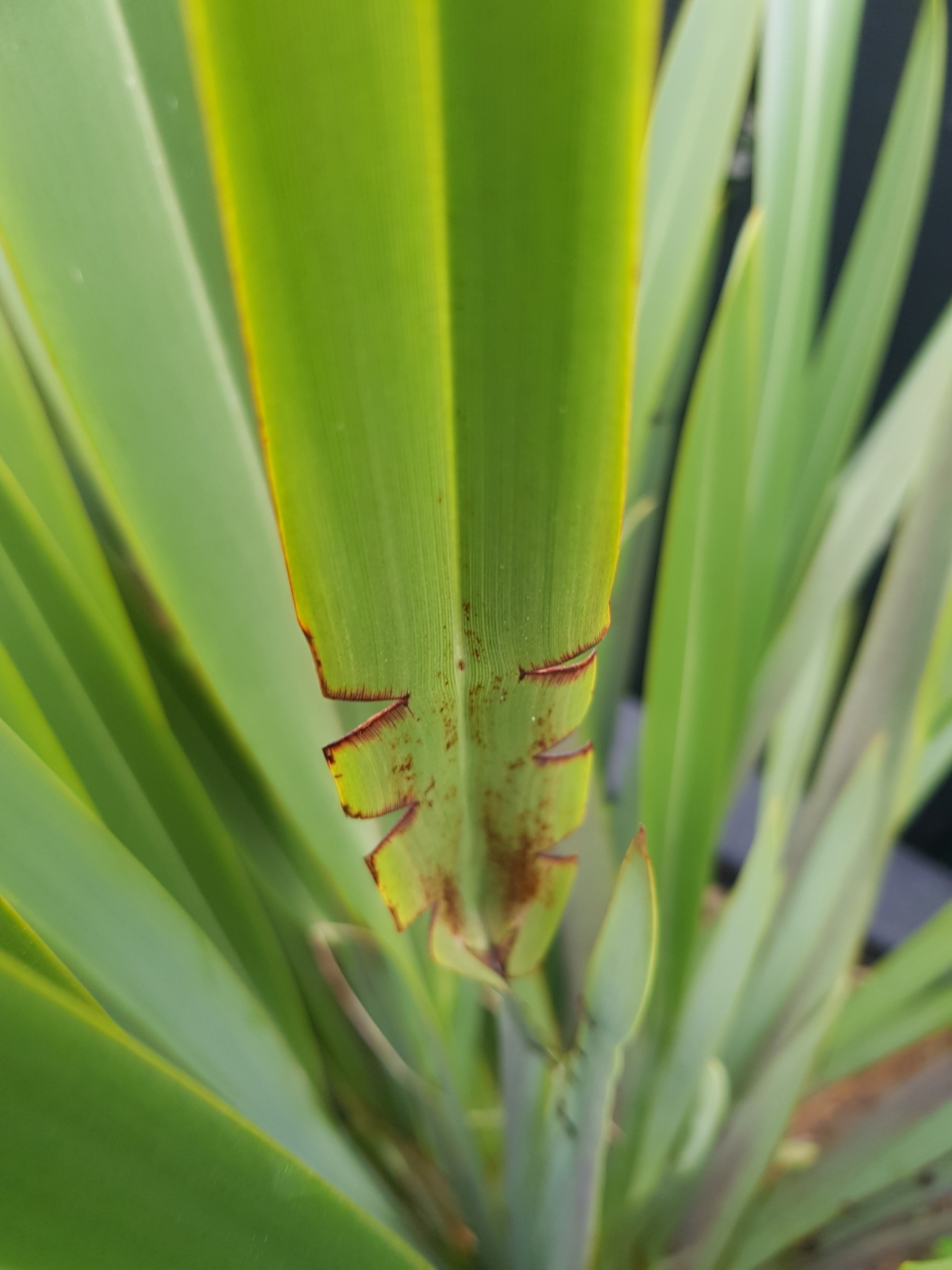
"Notch" formed from larvae damage to Phormium tenax.

This species inhabits the edges of native bush as well as scrubland, wetlands and coastal dunes. The larvae of I. steropastis can exist on multiple host plant species. It is best known for consuming the leaves of the New Zealand flax, but other larval host plants include endemic species in the genus Austroderia as well as introduced species in the genus Cortaderia. In particular Austroderia fulvida, A. richardii and C. selloana are all recorded as larval host species of I. steropastis as is Poa foliosa. This species has also been reared from species in the genus Libertia. The host plant is not a reliable guide to confirm the identification of this species as larvae of both I. arotis and I. blenheimensis also feed on similar hosts including flax species.

== Behaviour and life cycle ==
The larvae are nocturnal, hiding away in the base of their host plants and coming out to feed at night. The larvae possibly pupate in the soil below their host plant. The adults of this species are on the wing from September to April. The adult moth is also nocturnal but is attracted to light. They have been collected via a mercury vapour light trap.

== Interactions with humans ==
The larvae of this species is regarded as a pest as it chews distinctive notches in the sides of the flax leaves. This damage ensures the flax leaf cannot then be used for weaving.
