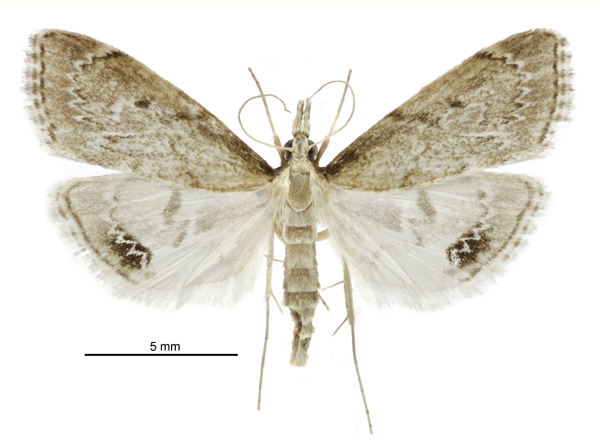
- Female
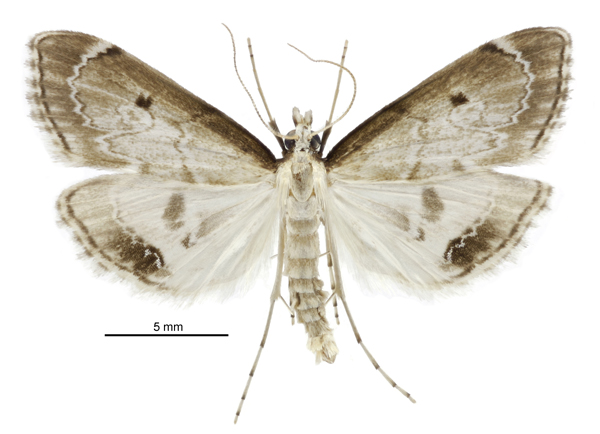
- Male

Scientific classification
- Kingdom: Animalia
- Phylum: Arthropoda
- Clade: Pancrustacea
- Class: Insecta
- Order: Lepidoptera
- Family: Crambidae
- Subfamily: Acentropinae
- Genus: Clepsicosma; Meyrick, 1888
- Species: C. iridia

Binomial name
- Clepsicosma iridia Meyrick, 1888

= Clepsicosma =

Genus of moths

Clepsicosma is a genus of moths in the family Crambidae. As at 2022, this genus contains only one described species, Clepsicosma iridia, which is endemic to New Zealand. The species inhabits native forest in the North Island as well as the northern and western parts of the South Island down to Westland. The larval host of this species is assumed to be species of Cutty grass, possibly including Gahnia setifolia and Gahnia xanthocarpa, although the life history of this species is unknown. The adults of C. iridia are on the wing from December until May. They are nocturnal, and are attracted to light. During the day the adults rest on the underside of leaves, including those Cutty grass species that may possibly be their larval hosts.

== Taxonomy ==
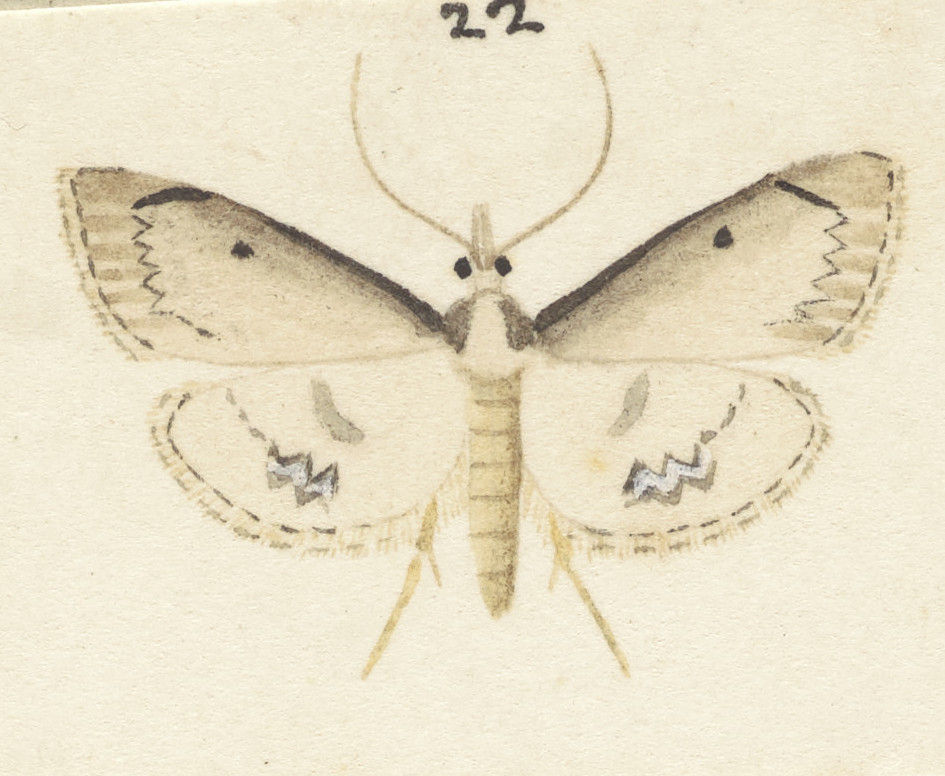
Illustration of C. irida by Hudson.

The genus and species were described by Edward Meyrick in 1888 using one female specimen collected in December in the Waitākere Ranges in the Auckland District. George Hudson discussed and illustrated this species in his 1928 book The butterflies and moths of New Zealand. The female holotype specimen is held at the Natural History Museum, London. The epithet iridia derives from the Roman goddess of rainbows, Iris. The name refers to the wavy line of iridescent scales on the forewing of this species.

As at 2022 there exists an undescribed Clepiscosma species that has been collected at Whakaruangangana and Ngawha as well as at coastal localites in Northland and in Auckland.

== Description ==
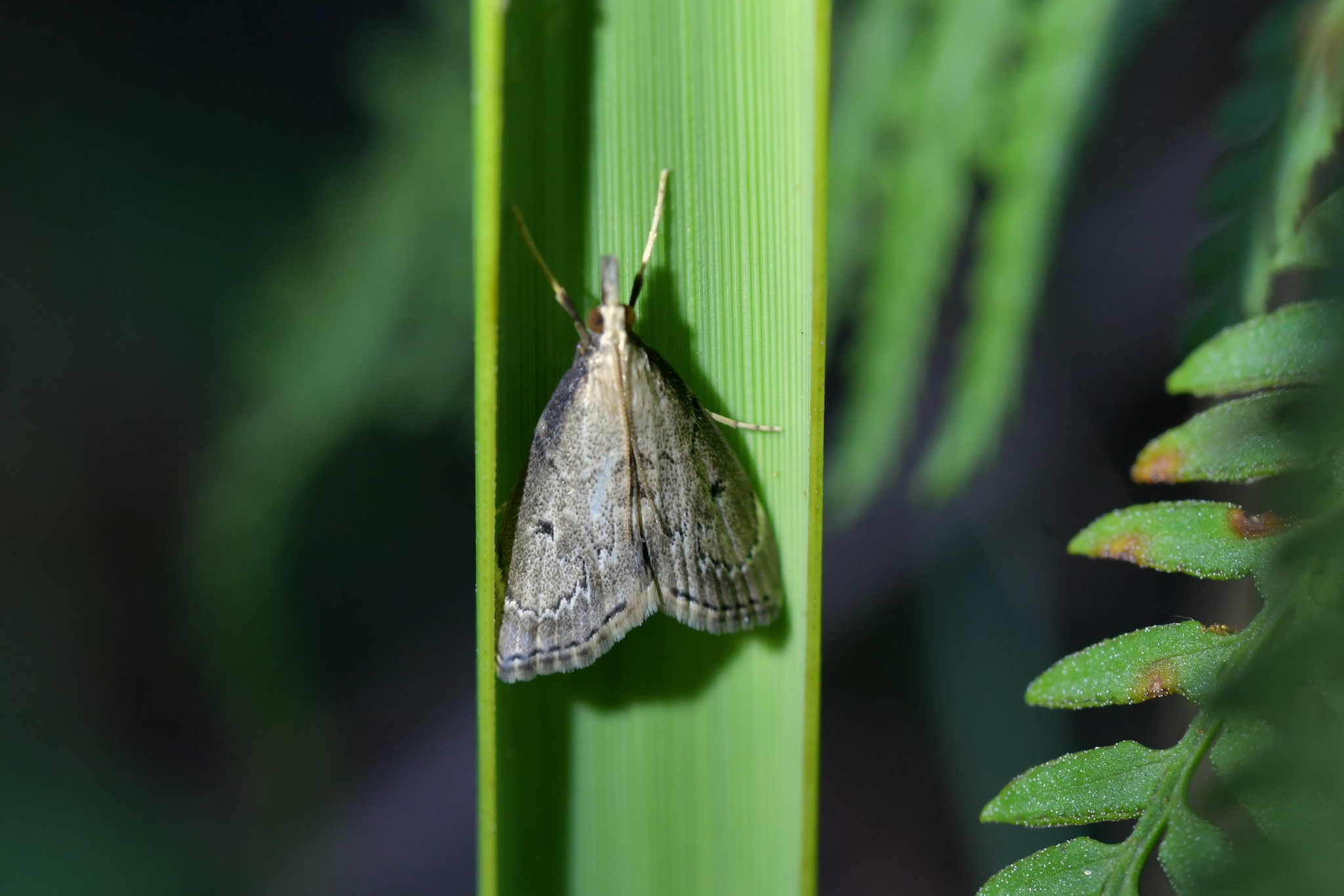
Observation of a live C. iridia.

Meyrick described the genus as follows:

Forehead flat, very oblique. Ocelli present. Tongue well-developed. Antennae 3/4, in male — ? Labial palpi long, straight, porrected, with long loosely projecting scales, attenuated to apex, terminal joint concealed. Maxillary palpi rather long, triangularly dilated with scales, not resting on labial. Posterior tibiae with outer spurs half inner. Forewings with veins 8 and 9 stalked, 10 closely approximated to 9 towards base, 11 oblique. Hindwings somewhat broader than forewings; veins 3, 4, 5 tolerably approximated at base, 7 from a point with 6, anastomosing with 8 to 1/3; lower median naked, internal area loosely haired.

Hudson described the species as follows:

The expansion of the wings is barely 7/8 inch. The forewings are very pale brownish-ochreous, almost white, with a dull brown shading on the costa near the base and a very conspicuous blackish discal spot; there is an indistinct, jagged, whitish, sub- terminal line, edged with pale brown towards base, sometimes emitting a, faint loop which almost touches the discal spot; there is a series of blackish-brown terminal marks. The hind-wings are white, with a rather large dusky lunule and a wavy white sub-terminal line extending to within 1/4 of the tornus; near its termination this line is brilliant white and iridescent beside being here strongly edged with black; there is a series of blackish-brown sub-terminal marks.

== Distribution ==
This species is endemic to New Zealand. It has been observed in the North Island and in the northern and western parts of the South Island down to Westland. This species is regarded as being common.

== Habitat and hosts ==
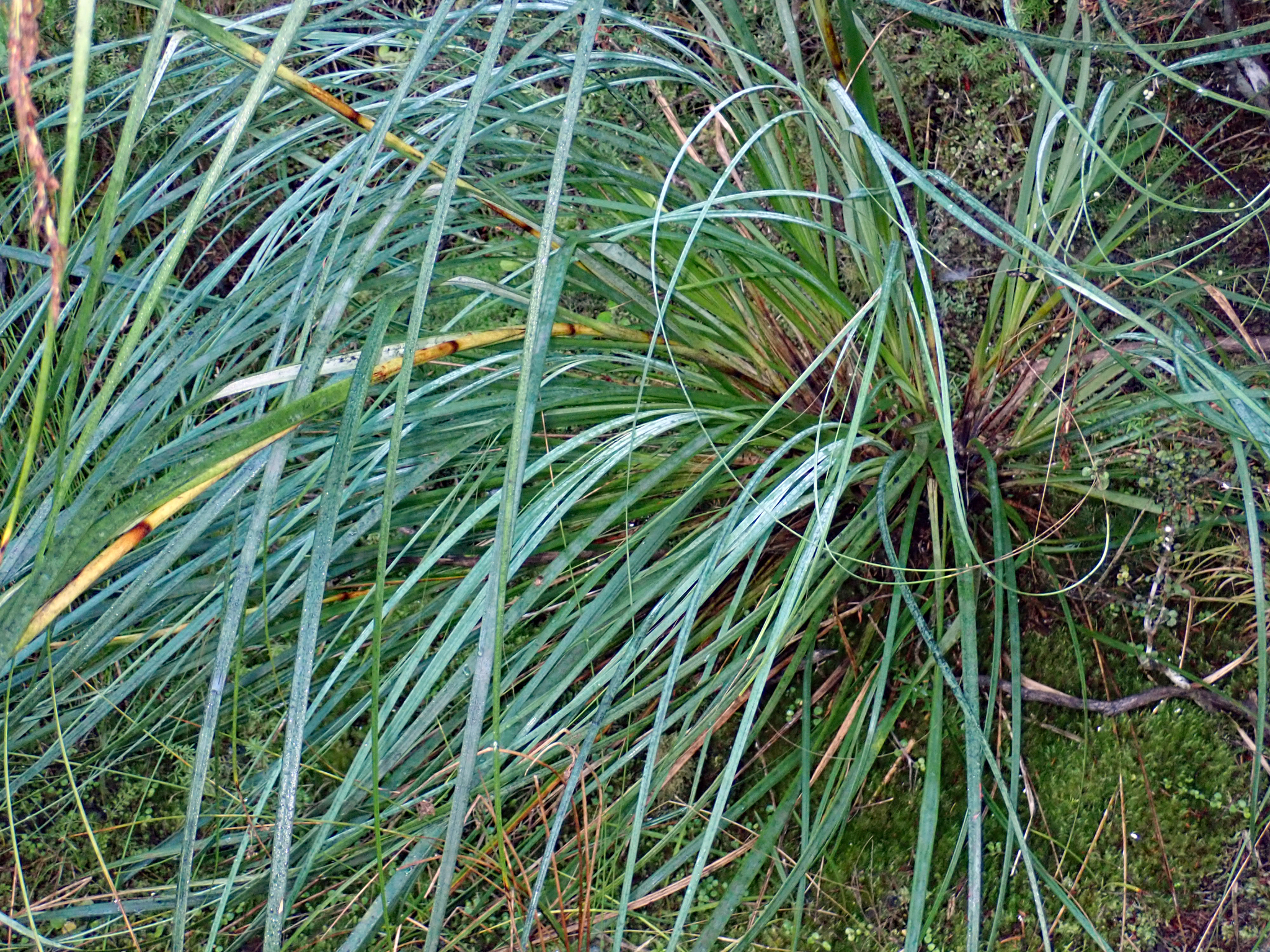
Possible larval host plant Gahnia setifolia.

Clepsicosma iridia inhabits native forest. The larval host of this species is assumed to be species of Cutty grass but as at 2014 this moth has not been reared in captivity to confirm this assumption. Hudson stated that the species was common amongst Gahnia setifolia. Hoare noted that this species is also associated with Gahnia xanthocarpa.

== Behaviour ==
The adult moths can be observed from late December until May. They are nocturnal and are attracted to light. During daylight hours they rest on the underside of leaves and have been found hiding amongst G. setifolia leaves near the ground.
