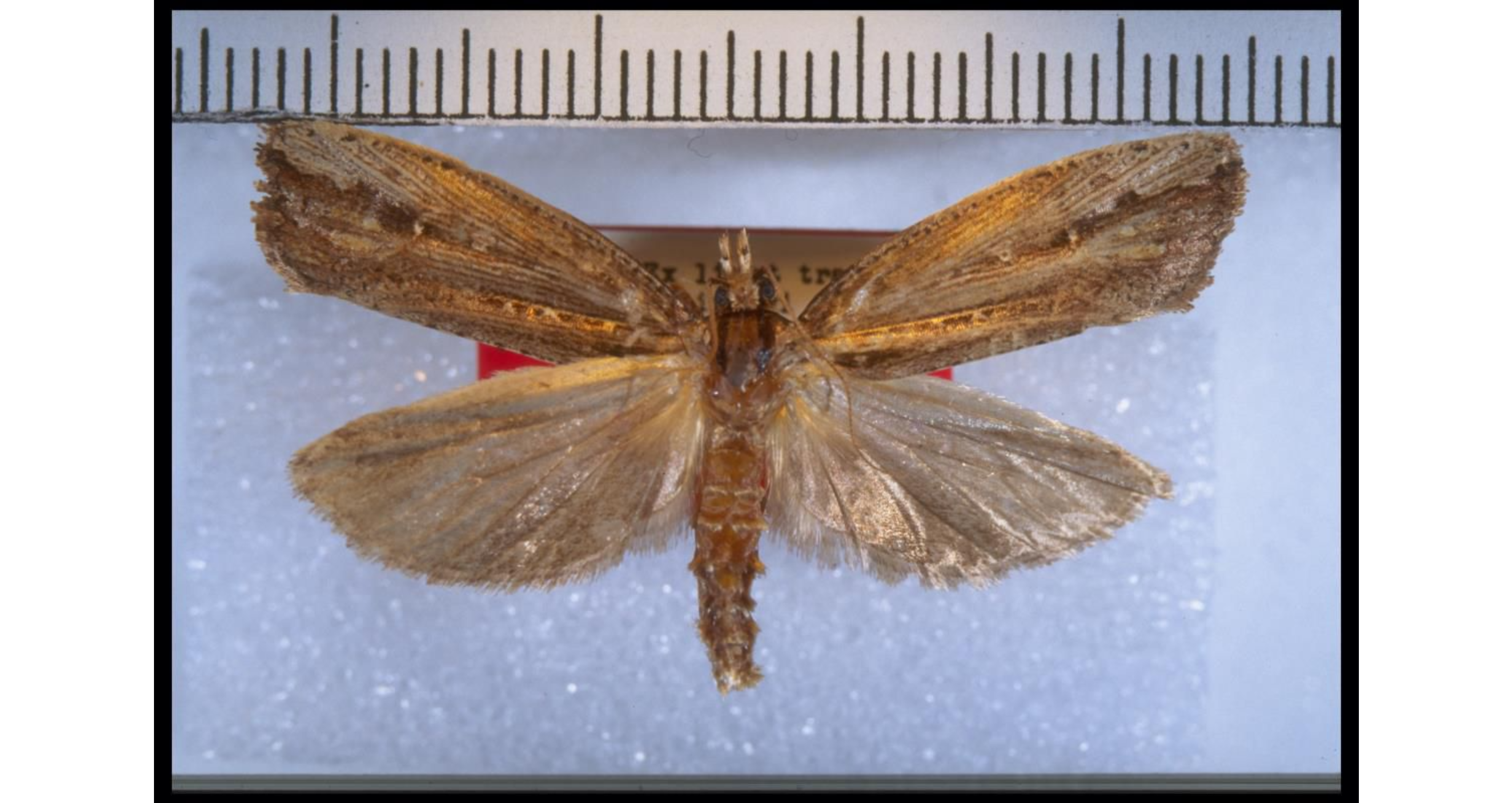
- Holotype

Scientific classification
- Kingdom: Animalia
- Phylum: Arthropoda
- Clade: Pancrustacea
- Class: Insecta
- Order: Lepidoptera
- Family: Plutellidae
- Genus: Proditrix
- Species: P. gahniae

Binomial name
- Proditrix gahniae Dugdale, 1987

= Proditrix gahniae =

Species of moth endemic to New Zealand

Proditrix gahniae is a species of moth in the family Glyphipterigidae first described by John S. Dugdale in 1987. It is endemic to New Zealand. The larval hosts of this species include Gahnia setifolia and Gahnia xanthocarpa.
