= Ichneutica theobroma =

Scientific classification
- Kingdom: Animalia
- Phylum: Arthropoda
- Clade: Pancrustacea
- Class: Insecta
- Order: Lepidoptera
- Superfamily: Noctuoidea
- Family: Noctuidae
- Genus: Ichneutica
- Species: I. theobroma

Binomial name
- Ichneutica theobroma Hoare, 2019

Species of moth

Ichneutica theobroma is a moth of the family Noctuidae. This species is endemic to New Zealand. The males of this species has a pink chocolate brown appearance to its forewings with a small white dot. The males of this species can be distinguished from the 'northern dark form' of Ichneutica arotis as they have broader shaped forewings with less markings than the latter species. The females are extremely difficult if not impossible to tell apart. I. theobroma are found in the northern parts of the North Island and inhabit kauri forests. The life history of this species is unknown as are the host species of its larvae although it has been hypothesised that larval hosts include Gahnia setifolia and Gahnia xanthocarpa. Adults of this species are on the wing from mid September until early November and are attracted to light.

== Taxonomy ==
I. theobroma was first described by Robert Hoare in 2019. The male holotype specimen was collected by Kenneth John Fox and John Stewart Dugdale at the Omahuta Kauri Sanctuary in Northland in October. The holotype specimen is held in the New Zealand Arthropod Collection.

== Description ==
The adult male of I. theobroma has a pink chocolate brown appearance to its forewings with the only marking on the forewing being a small white dot. I. theobroma is very similar in appearance to 'northern dark form’ of I. arotis. Male I. theobroma have broader shaped forewings with less markings in comparison to male I. arotis but the females of these two species can be extremely difficult if not impossible to distinguish. Currently the two species are separated on location, as I. arotis has a range that extends to locations in the central North Island, as well as the date of collection, as I. arotis appears to spend a longer time on the wing. However, there is overlap of these factors in areas such as the Waitākere Ranges.

The adult male wingspan of this species is between 42 and 48 mm and for the female is between 42 and 44 mm.

== Distribution ==
This species is endemic to New Zealand and is found in the northern parts of the North Island and is unknown south of the Auckland region.

== Habitat ==
This species inhabits kauri forests.

== Behaviour ==
The adults of this species are on the wing from mid September until early November and are attracted to light.

== Life history and host species ==
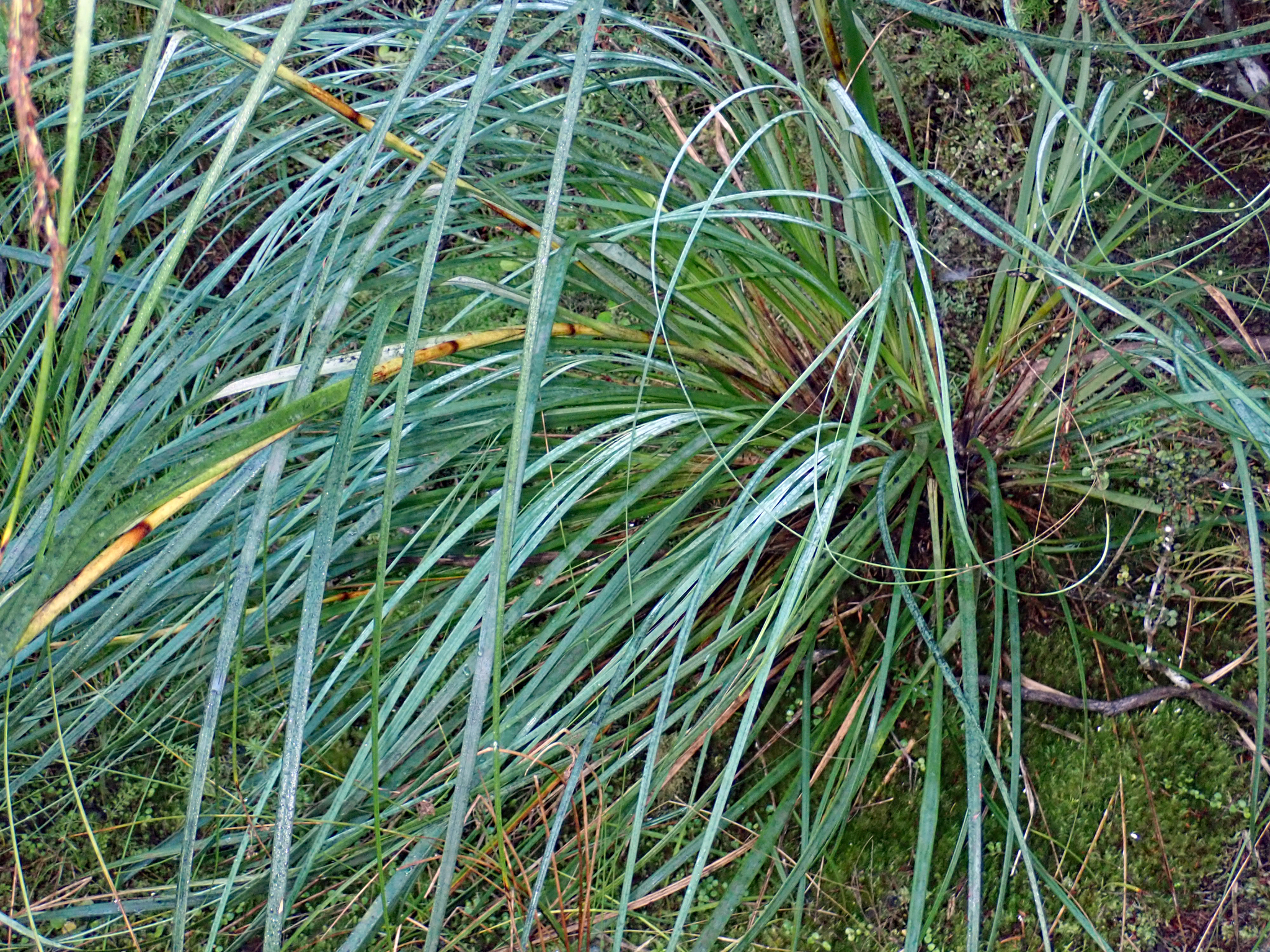
Gahnia setifolia, a possible larval host for I. theobroma.

The life history of this species is unknown as are the host species of its larvae. However it has been hypothesised that host plants include Gahnia setifolia and Gahnia xanthocarpa.
