= Glyphipterix leptosema =

Scientific classification
- Kingdom: Animalia
- Phylum: Arthropoda
- Clade: Pancrustacea
- Class: Insecta
- Order: Lepidoptera
- Family: Glyphipterigidae
- Genus: Glyphipterix
- Species: G. leptosema

Binomial name
- Glyphipterix leptosema Meyrick, 1888

Species of moth endemic to New Zealand

Glyphipterix leptosema is a species of moth in the family Glyphipterigidae. It was first described by Edward Meyrick in 1888. It is endemic to New Zealand and has been observed in both the North and South Islands. This species frequents habitats where its larval host plant Gahnia setifolia is found. Larvae bore into the flower stems of that host and feed under the surface of the stem. They pupate in the burrows formed as a result of this feeding. Adults are on the wing between November and February but are rarely observed.

== Taxonomy ==
This species was first described by Edward Meyrick in 1888 using a female specimen collected in Auckland in January. George Hudson discussed and illustrated this species under this name in his 1928 book The butterflies and moths of New Zealand. In 1988 John S. Dugdale confirmed this placement. The holotype is held at the Natural History Museum, London.

== Description ==
Larva under the surface of the flower stem of Gahnia setifolia or Gahnia xanthocarpa.

Hudson described the larva of this species as follows:

The length of the present larva is about 1/4 inch; pale green, with a very broad, indefinite pinkish dorsal band; the head is pale brown and shining and the second and anal segments are horny and pale brown; there are a few very fine bristles.

Illustration by Hudson.

Meyrick described the female of the species as follows:

Female. — 8 mm. Head and thorax dark bronzy-fuscous. Palpi white, with four black bands. Antennae and abdomen dark fuscous. Legs dark fuscous, ringed with ochreous-whitish. Forewings elongate, posteriorly slightly dilated, costa gently arched, apex round-pointed, hindmargin very obliquely rounded; dark bronzy-fuscous ; seven oblique streaks from costa, reaching nearly half across wing, first from 1/3 of costa, most oblique, first four very slender, grey, obscure, forming minute white dots on costa, third terminating in a crescentic violet-silvery-metallic mark in disc, preceded by a violet-metallic dot, last three shorter, wedge-shaped, white, extremities violet-metallic ; a slender very oblique straight streak from middle of inner margin, apex acute, not reaching half across wing, upper half ochreous-white, lower half grey ; a slender violet-blue-metallic angulated fascia from costa at 2/3 , between third and fourth streaks, to inner margin before anal angle, costal extremity white ; an irregular violet-metallic streak along hindmargin : cilia grey, with a blackish line, interrupted by a triangular whitish indentation above middle (round apex imperfect). Hindwings narrow, dark fuscous-grey ; cilia grey.

Hudson pointed out that Tinea margaritis is similar in appearance to G. leptosema.

== Distribution ==
This species is endemic to New Zealand and has been observed in both the North and South Islands.

== Habitat and hosts ==
This species frequents habitats where its larval host plant Gahnia setifolia is found. The larvae of this species feed within the flower stems of this endemic to New Zealand sedge but does not tunnel into the central hollow of those stems. Larvae pupate within the burrows formed as a result of their feeding.

== Behaviour ==
Adults are day flying. Adults have been observed on the wing between November and February. Hudson stated this species is seldom seen.
