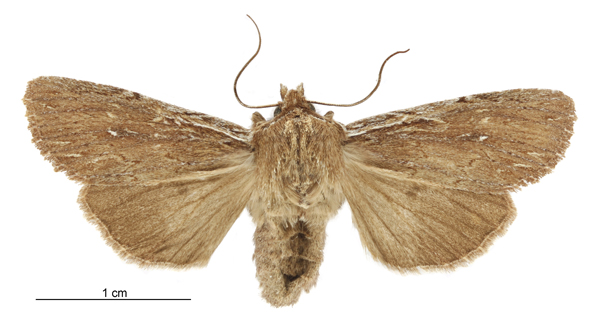
- Female
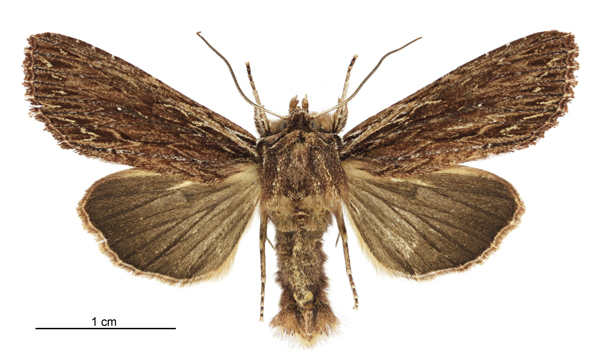
- Male

Scientific classification
- Kingdom: Animalia
- Phylum: Arthropoda
- Clade: Pancrustacea
- Class: Insecta
- Order: Lepidoptera
- Superfamily: Noctuoidea
- Family: Noctuidae
- Genus: Ichneutica
- Species: I. infensa

Binomial name
- Ichneutica infensa (Walker, 1857)

Synonyms
- Orthosia infensa Walker, 1857; Graphania infensa (Walker, 1857); Mamestra arachnias Meyrick, 1887; Graphania arachnias (Meyrick, 1887); Melanchra infensa (Meyrick, 1887)

= Ichneutica infensa =

Species of moth

Ichneutica infensa is a moth of the family Noctuidae. This species is endemic to New Zealand. It is found throughout the North and South Islands but appears to be rarely seen or collected in the north and west parts of the North Island. As at 2019 the northern limit to the range of this species is Titirangi. I. infensa inhabits tussock grasslands and native forest. Larvae are nocturnal and its host plants are in the genus Carex including Carex solandri. Larvae have also been raised on Bromus catharticus. Adults of this species are on the wing from late October to February. Adults are narrow winged with patterns on the forewings that are relatively distinctive. However this species can possibly be confused with I. inscripta.

== Taxonomy ==
This species was described by Francis Walker in 1857 using a female specimen from Percy Earl and presumably collected at Waikouaiti. Walker originally named the species Orthosia infensa. The female holotype specimen is held at the Natural History Museum, London. J. S. Dugdale, discussed this species in his 1988 catalogue and placed it within the Graphania genus. In 2019 Robert Hoare undertook a major review of New Zealand Noctuidae. During this review the genus Ichneutica was greatly expanded and the genus Graphania was subsumed into that genus as a synonym. As a result of this review, this species is now known as Ichneutica infensa.

== Description ==
A. V. Chappell described the egg of the species as follows:

Earth-grey; later becoming ringed with brown near the top; finely sculptured.

Chappell also described the mature larva as follows:

Length about 1 1/4 inches; yellowish-brown with a very broad reddish dorsal line and fine dorsal lines of the same colour. Head dark brown.

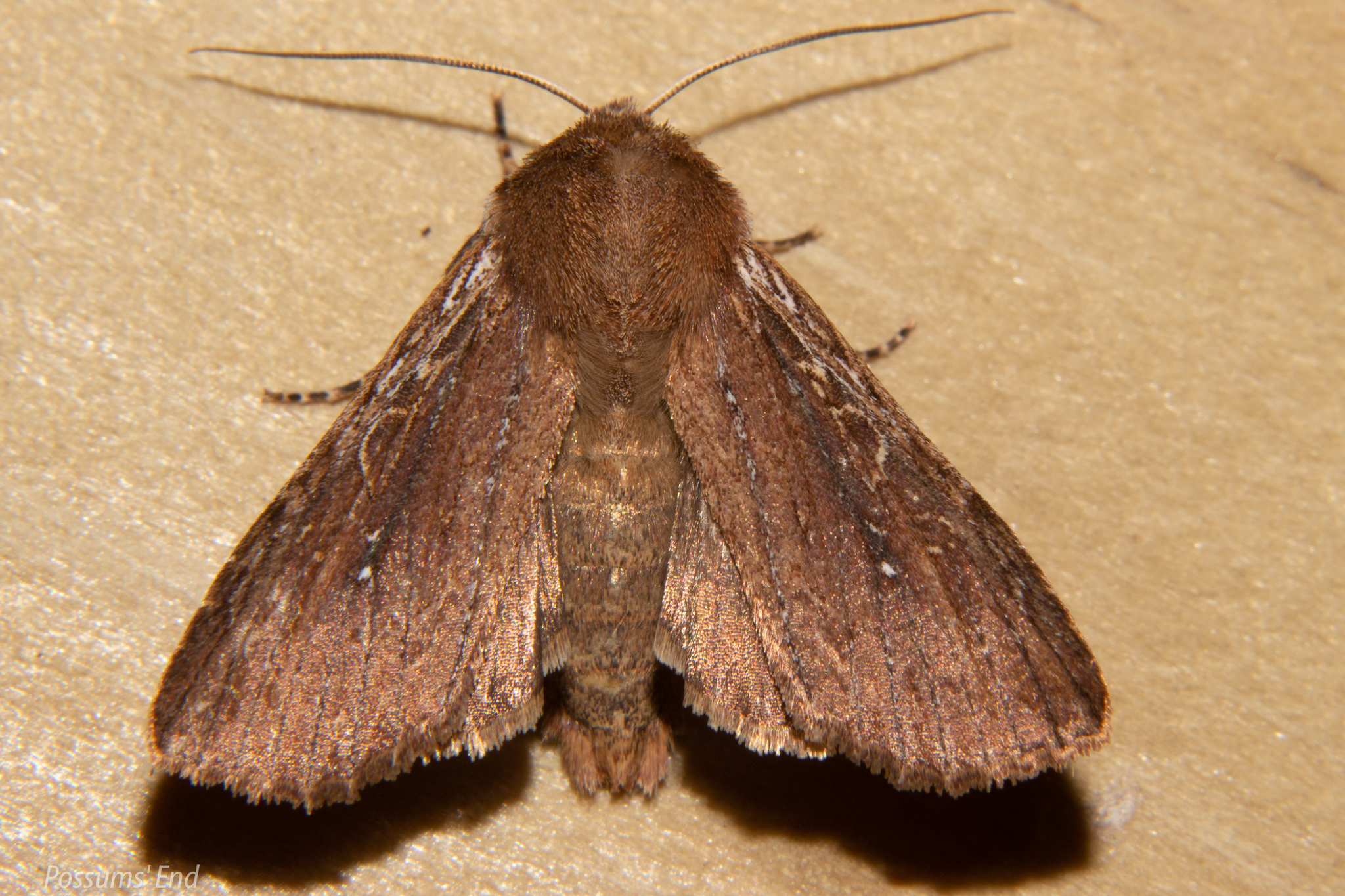
Observation of Ichneutica infensa

Walker described the adults of this species as follows:

Female. Ferruginous-red. Palpi ascending; third joint cylindrical, not more than one-fourth of the length of the second. Thorax crested, with a white black-bordered band in front, joining a white humeral spot. Abdomen pale fawn-colour. Fore wings with a few white marks along the costa and on some of the veins; orbicular spot obsolete; reniform slightly indicated by a white mark. Hind wings somewhat aeneous, cinereous towards the base; ciliae whitish. Length of the body 6 lines; of the wings 16 lines.

The adult male of this species has a wingspan of between 32 and 37 mm and the female has a wingspan of between 33 and 37 mm. This species is narrow winged with patterns on its forewings that are relatively distinctive. However this species can possibly be confused with I. inscripta. I. inscripta has a more uneven distribution of colours on its forewing in comparison to I. infensa. I. infensa also has a more smooth and unmarked appearance to the inner margin of its forewing.

== Distribution ==
This species is endemic to New Zealand. This species is found throughout the North and South Islands but appears to be rarely seen or collected in the north and west parts of the North Island. As at 2019 the northern limit to this species range is Titirangi.

== Habitat ==
I. infensa inhabits different habitats including tussock grasslands and native forests.

== Behaviour ==
Larvae are nocturnal. Adults of this species are on the wing from late October to February. They are attracted to light and have been collected via a mercury vapour light trap.

== Life history and host species ==
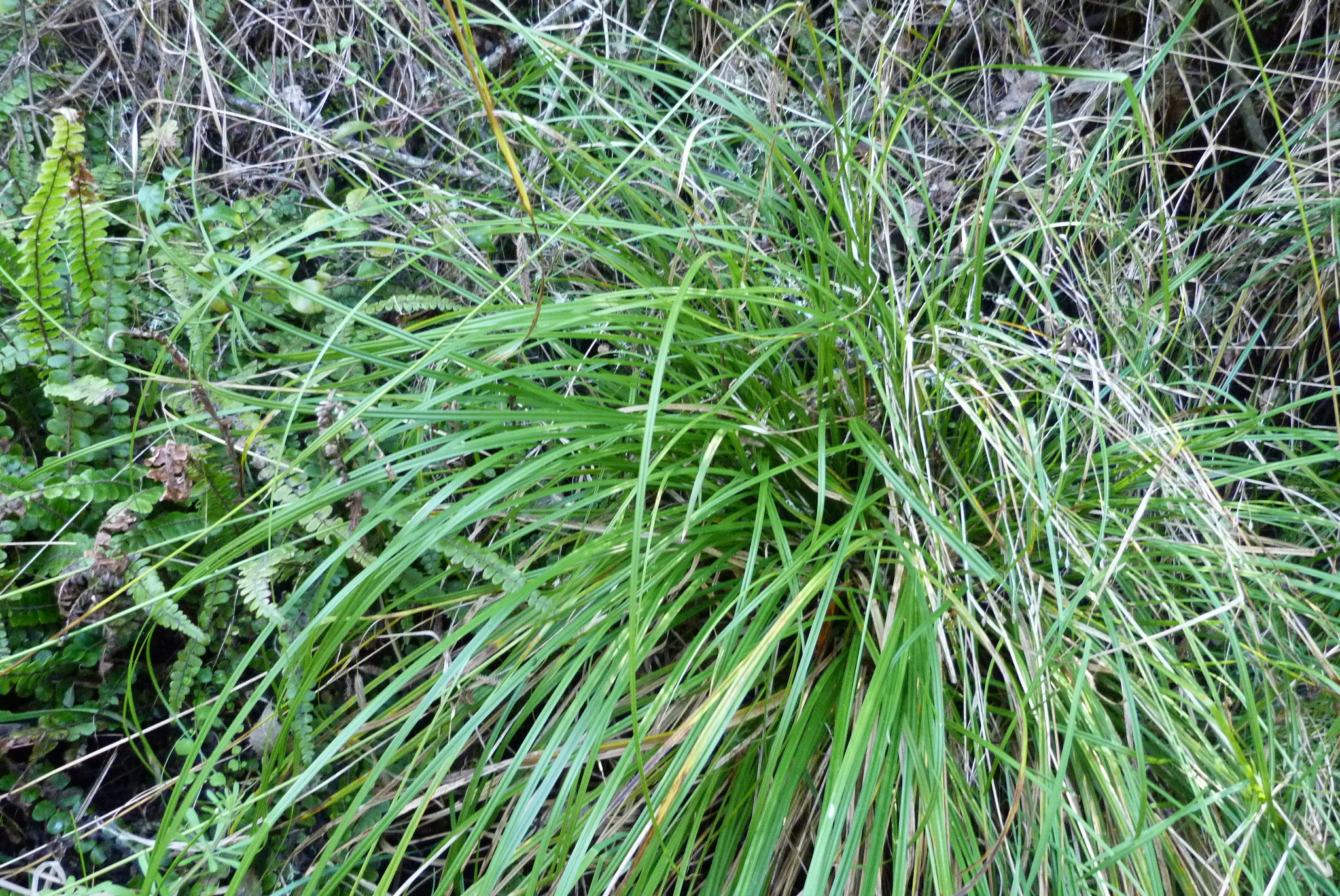
Carex solandri, a larval host species for I. infensa

Chappell, when rearing this species, stated that he obtained eggs in December and pupation happened in September. Larval host plants are in the genus Carex including Carex solandri and larvae have also been raised on Bromus catharticus.
