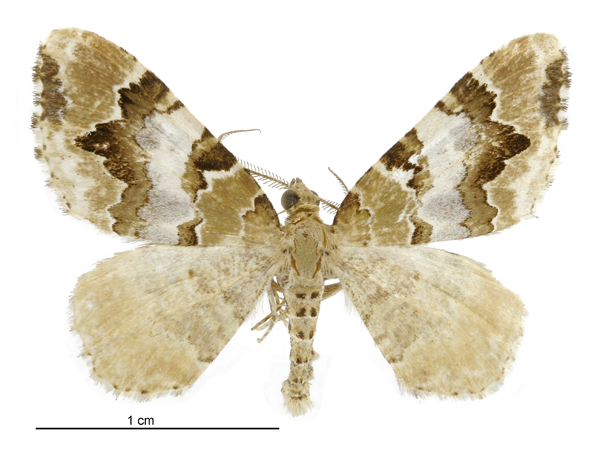
- Male
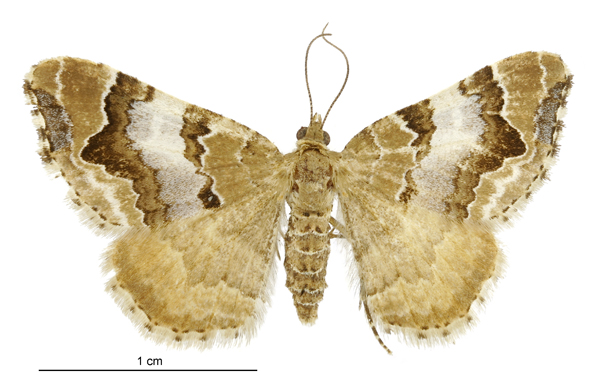
- Female

Conservation status
- Nationally Critical (NZ TCS)

Scientific classification
- Kingdom: Animalia
- Phylum: Arthropoda
- Clade: Pancrustacea
- Class: Insecta
- Order: Lepidoptera
- Family: Geometridae
- Genus: Asaphodes
- Species: A. obarata

Binomial name
- Asaphodes obarata (Felder & Rogenhofer, 1875)

Synonyms
- Cidaria obarata Felder & Rogenhofer, 1875; Larentia obarata (Felder & Rogenhofer, 1875); Xanthorhoe obarata (Felder & Rogenhofer, 1875)

= Asaphodes obarata =

Species of moth endemic to New Zealand

Asaphodes obarata, also known as the blue carpet moth, is a moth in the family Geometridae. It is endemic to New Zealand and has been collected in both the North and South Islands. It seems to inhabit the margins of native forest and also frequents plains, with an affinity for gorse hedges. The host plants of the larvae of this species are unknown. The adults are on the wing in December and January. It is classified as critically endangered by the Department of Conservation. There has been a contraction of range of A. obarata with it now being regarded as locally extinct in both Dunedin and Invercargill.

== Taxonomy ==
This species was first described by Cajetan Felder and Alois Friedrich Rogenhofer in 1875 as Cidaria obarata. The female holotype specimen was collected by Thomas R. Oxley in Nelson and is held at the Natural History Museum in London. Edward Meyrick placed the species within the genus Larentia in 1884. In 1898 George Vernon Hudson placed the species within the genus Xanthorhoe. In 1971 John S. Dugdale assigned Xanthorhoe obarata to the genus Asaphodes. In 1988 Dugdale confirmed this placement in his catalogue of New Zealand Lepidoptera.

== Description ==
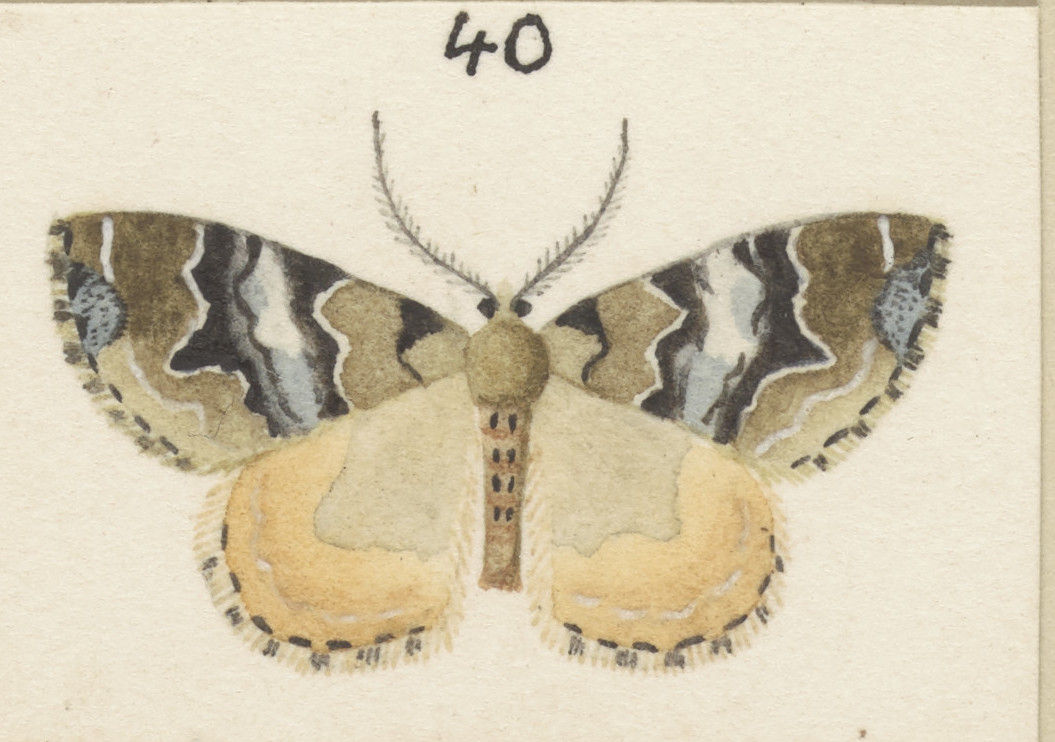
Illustration of A. obarata by George Hudson.

Hudson described A. obarata as follows:

The expansion of the wings is barely 1 inch. The fore-wings are pale greyish-ochreous; there is an interrupted reddish-brown transverse band near the base; two faint, interrupted shaded blackish hues, one at about one-third and the other at about two-thirds, enclosing between them a large central area, which contains a very distinct black dot above the middle, and several irregular shaded black marks; beyond this there is a wavy reddish-brown band; the apex of the wing is somewhat projecting, and the termen is considerably bowed. The hind-wings are pale grey, with a paler central band, and numerous faint, wavy, darker grey lines. The cilia of all the wings are white, banded with dark grey.

== Distribution ==
Asaphodes obarata is endemic to New Zealand. As well as Nelson, it has been collected in Wellington, Christchurch and at the foot of Mount Hutt. It has also been collected at Waimarino and Ohakune in the North Island as well as in Akaroa, Otira, Dunedin, Queenstown and Invercargill in the South Island.

This species is regarded as being rare. There has been a contraction of range in Dunedin and Southland; and this species is now considered locally extinct in both Dunedin and Invercargill.

== Ecology and habitat ==
Hudson states that this species could be found on the margins of forests and R. W. Fereday communicated that it was a plain-frequenting species that has an affinity for gorse hedges. Hudson also stated that adult moths were on the wing in December and January.

== Host plants ==
The host plants of this species are unknown.

== Conservation status ==
This moth is classified under the New Zealand Threat Classification system as being Nationally Critical. It has been hypothesised that this species is likely under threat as a result of habitat loss.
