= Cutty grass =

Cutty grass is a common name for several grasses with sharp leaves which may inflict cuts:

- Austroderia
- Carex geminata
- Carex coriacea
- Cyperus ustulatus, native to New Zealand
- Ficinia spiralis
- Gahnia grandis (syn. Cladium psittacorum)
- Gahnia setifola
