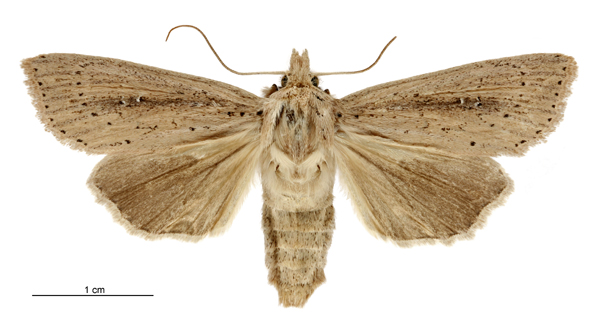
- Female
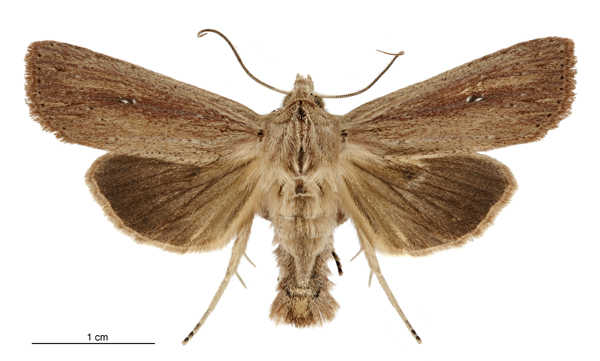
- Male

Scientific classification
- Kingdom: Animalia
- Phylum: Arthropoda
- Clade: Pancrustacea
- Class: Insecta
- Order: Lepidoptera
- Superfamily: Noctuoidea
- Family: Noctuidae
- Genus: Ichneutica
- Species: I. epiastra

Binomial name
- Ichneutica epiastra (Meyrick, 1911)

Synonyms
- Leucania epiastra Meyrick, 1911; Dipaustica epiastra (Meyrick, 1911); Graphania epiastra (Meyrick, 1911)

= Ichneutica epiastra =

Species of moth

Ichneutica epiastra is a moth of the family Noctuidae. It is endemic to New Zealand and is found throughout the North, South and Stewart Islands. This species prefers open habitats such as wetlands, dunes and forest clearings. Eggs are laid in the summer or autumn and larvae feed during winter and spring. The larval host species are found within the genus Austroderia. The adult moths are on the wing between October and February. Adult I. epiastra can possibly be confused with the similar species I. arotis and I. haedifrontella however there are differences in appearance that enables I. epiastra to be distinguished from these two species. In particular I. epiastra has long sharp-tipped ‘horns' on its head that are diagnostic. The adults of this species appear reluctant to be attracted to light although they do come more frequently to the brighter mercury vapour light traps.

== Taxonomy ==
This moth was first described by Edward Meyrick in 1911 and named Leucania epiastra. The male lectotype specimen is held at the Natural History Museum, London. In 1988 J. S. Dugdale, in his catalogue on New Zealand lepidoptera, placed this species within the Dipaustica genus. In 2019 Robert Hoare undertook a major review of New Zealand Noctuidae species. During this review the genus Ichneutica was greatly expanded and the genus Dipaustica was subsumed into that genus as a synonym. As a result of this review, this species is now known as Ichneutica epiastra.

== Description ==
George Hudson described the eggs of I. epiastra as follows:

The egg is spherical, flattened at the base, and rather coarsely ribbed, the ribs radiating from the micorpyle. The colour is at first a uniform pale yellow but after a few days the micropyle becomes dark brown and a dark brown circle appears round it.

Hudson went on to describe the larva of this species:

Illustration of I. epiastra larva by Hudson

The full grown larva is 1 7/8 inch in length, dull brownish green in colour, sometimes tinged with reddish brown, especially on posterior segments. The dorsal and subdorsal lines are very narrow but fairly well marked; dull white in colour faintly edged with red or reddish brown. The lateral line is somewhat indistinct, white in colour. On it are situated the spiracles which are dull cream-colour edged in black. The lateral line is often edged with small brown blotches situated above the spiracles, and on the anterior segments these blotches are sometimes joined to form a broad, faintly marked upward edging to the lateral line. The integument, especially on the dorsal surface, has a number of fine white branching veins, and on each segment is a number of minute black dots from which spring short brown bristles. The prolegs are of the same colour as the body, edged with dark-brown hooks. The head is horny, amber in colour, mottled and netted with brown.

Hudson goes on to state that the pupa appears light brown in colour initially and then turns a shiny very dark brown.

Meyrick first described the adults of this species as follows:

♂♀. 40-44 mm. Head and thorax light greyish-ochreous, thorax with two pairs of fine oblique black lines or series of specks, prothorax with strong triangular crest. Antennae in ♂ moderately fasciculate-ciliated. Abdomen pale greyish-ochreous with fine black specks, densely hairy towards base. Anterior tarsi with two apical joints black. Forewings light - brownish, with scattered black specks, towards base and costa suffused with light greyish-ochreous; first line represented by two or three black dots, second line by a series on veins; two white dots longitudinally placed about lower angle of cell, connected by grey suffusion; a terminal series of black dots between veins : cilia light brownish-ochreous. Hindwings fuscous, paler and tinged with pale greyish-ochreous towards base; cilia whitish-ochreous, tips whitish.

Hudson also described the adults of this species:

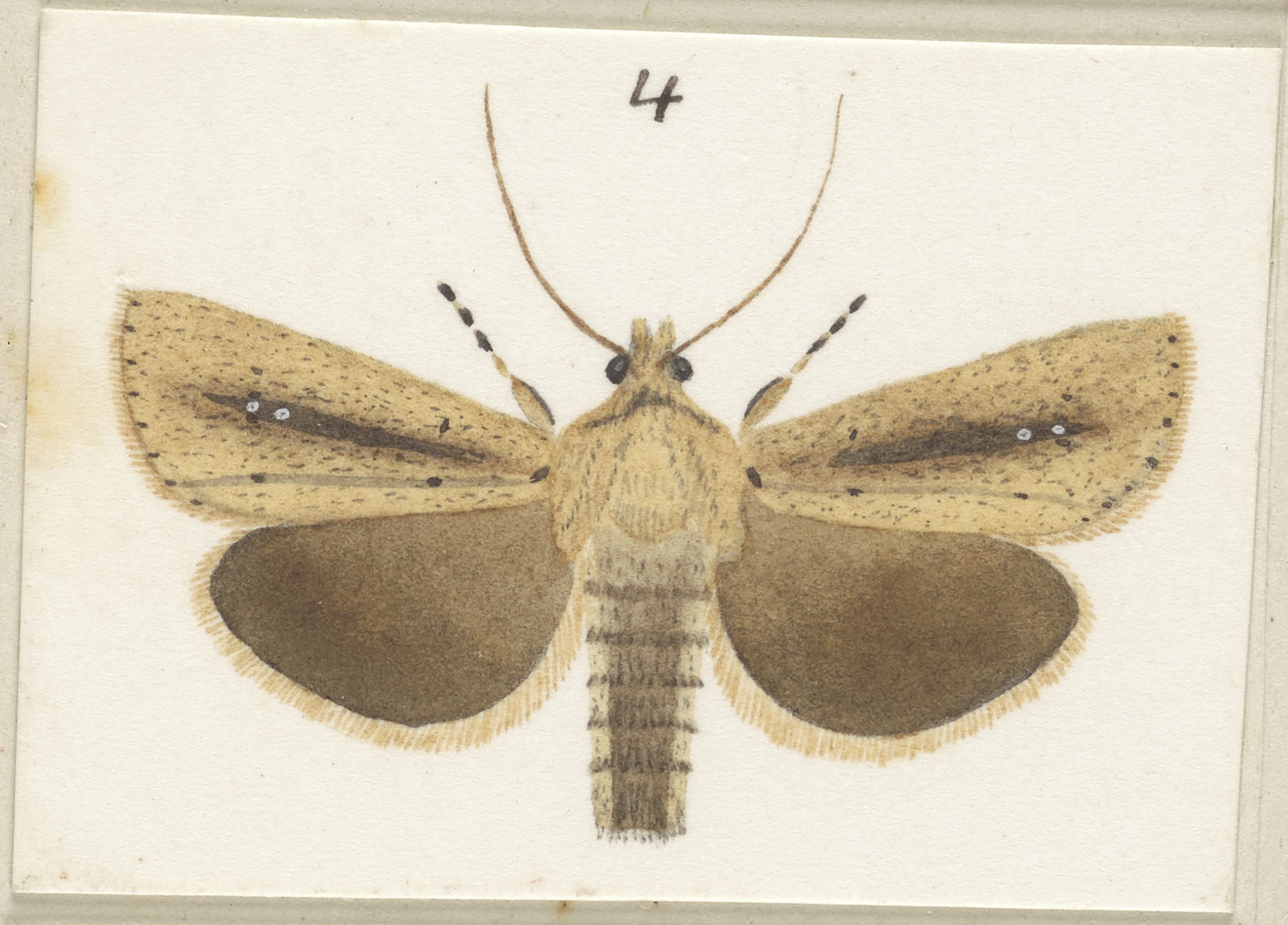
Watercolour illustration by Hudson of adult I. epiastra

The expansion of the wings is 1 5/8 inches. The forewings are pale brown with a broad, cloudy longitudinal streak, containing two white dots near the middle of the wing; there are numerous minute black specks, especially on the central area; two black dots indicate the position of the first line and a curved row of similar dots marks the second line; there is also a series of terminal dot. The hindwings are dark, brownish-grey, with pale brown cilia tipped with white.

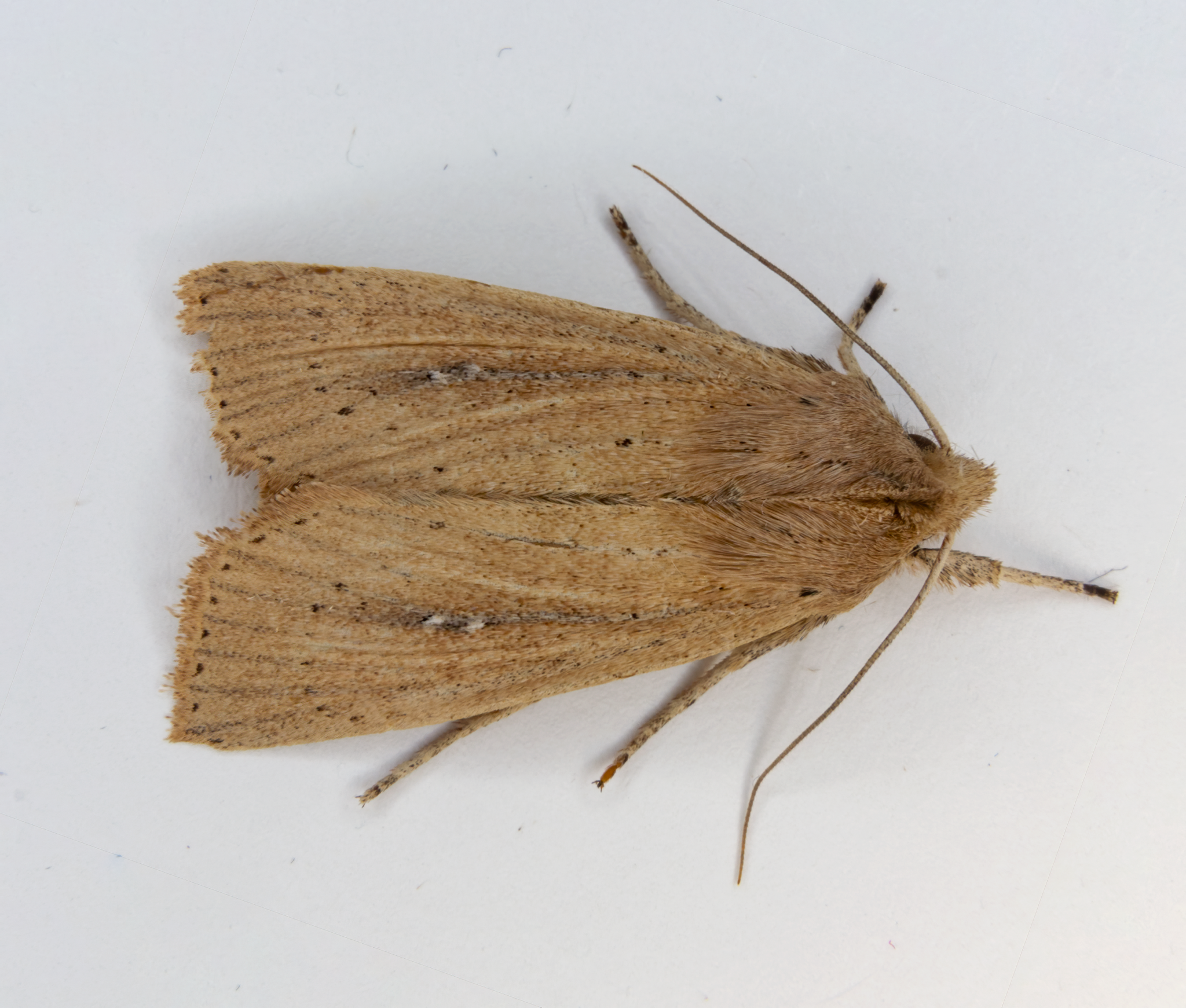
Live specimen of I. epiastra

This species is variable in both colour and size. The colour of adults of this species can range from pale to pink ochreous up to a deep brown. The adult male wingspan is between 33 and 43 mm and the female wingspan is between 38 and 45 mm. There are specimens that have been collected at Ōkārito in Westland that are regarded as a dwarf form of I. epiastra as they are very similar both in appearance and in genitalia but are smaller than the typical I. epiastra. The dwarf Westland form male has a wingspan of between 32 and 33 mm and the female has a wingspan of 32 mm. I. epiastra can be confused with the similar species I. arotis and I. haedifrontella. I. epiastra has small projections on its head that are diagnostic though these are sometimes difficult to discern. In comparison to the other two species these tubercles are long and sharp tipped. A row of black dots can be seen on the forewing of I. epiastra where as I. arotis, has faint dashes, if any markings at all, on a similar part of its forewings. I. haedifrontella only has short and blunt tubercles on its head. This is the only visible feature that distinguishes I. haedifrontella from I. epiatra although male I. haedifrontella have distinctive genitalia that can be seen via dissection.

== Distribution ==
I. epiastra is endemic to New Zealand. This species is found throughout the North, South and Stewart Islands.

== Habitat ==
This species lives in open habitats such as wetlands, dunes and forest clearings.

== Life history and behaviour ==
Eggs of this species are laid in summer or autumn and larvae feed during winter and spring. The larvae feed at night. During the day larvae hide in the bases of the leaves of their host species. When ready to pupate the larva journeys to the flower stem of its host, eats into the internal part of the stem and makes a chamber at the joint. This is where the larva spends several weeks before pupating. In preparation, just prior to pupating the larva will create a hole at the top of the chamber leaving only a thin layer of plant material to cover the hole. After approximately six weeks the adult moth emerges - normally in the evening between 7pm and 9pm. Adults are on the wing between October and February. This species appears reluctantly attracted to light. It does however come more frequently to the brighter mercury vapour traps.

== Host species ==
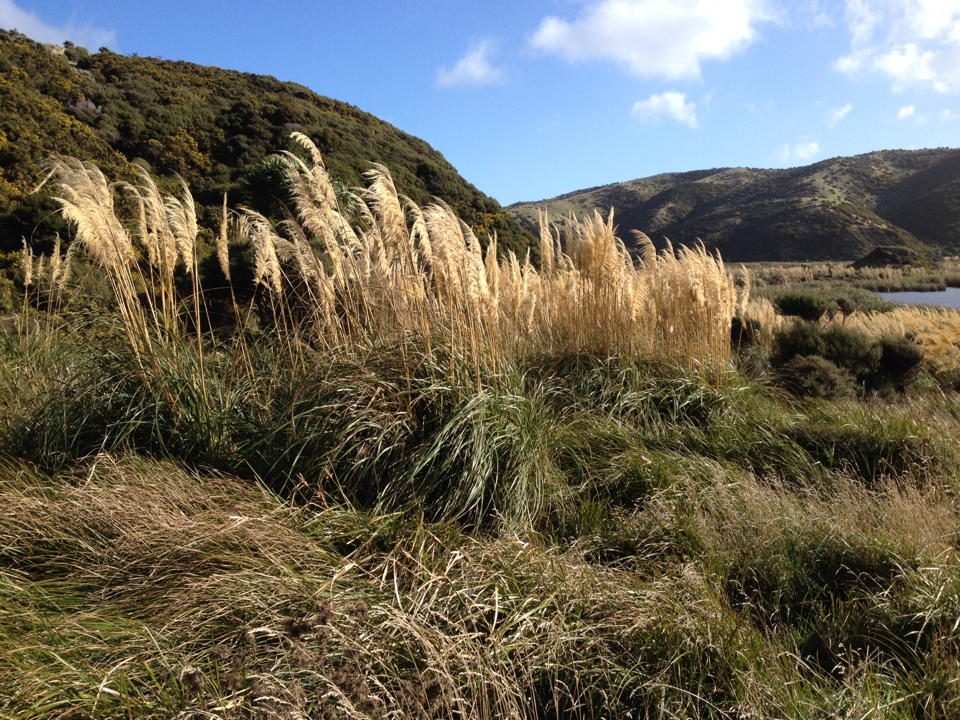
Austroderia toetoe, a host plant for I. epiastra larvae

The plant host species for the larvae of I. epiastra are in the genus Austroderia.
