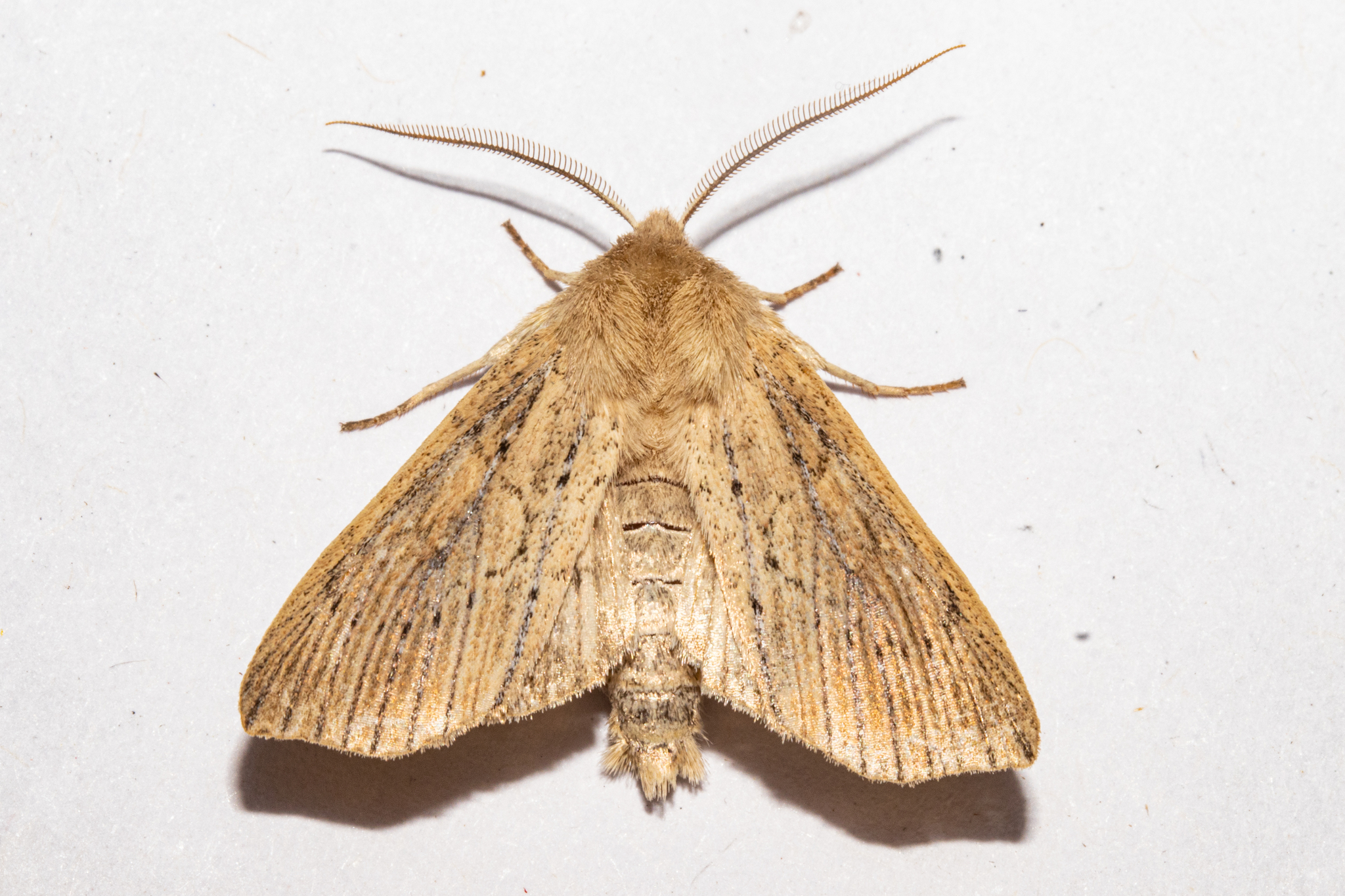
- Ichneutica cornuta specimen found in Fiordland National Park

Scientific classification
- Kingdom: Animalia
- Phylum: Arthropoda
- Clade: Pancrustacea
- Class: Insecta
- Order: Lepidoptera
- Superfamily: Noctuoidea
- Family: Noctuidae
- Genus: Ichneutica
- Species: I. cornuta

Binomial name
- Ichneutica cornuta Hoare, 2019

= Ichneutica cornuta =

Species of moth

Ichneutica cornuta is a moth of the family Noctuidae. This species is endemic to New Zealand and is only found in the South Island, in and around the Southern Alps. I. cornuta is very similar in appearance to pale forms of I. arotis. It is easy to confuse the two species as their ranges overlap. Male I. cornuta can be distinguished as it has longer pectinations on the antennae and the female lacks the dark scaling that can be found on the thorax of the I. arotis. There are also subtle differences in the forewing patterns of the two species. The life history of this species is unknown as are the host species of its larvae. Adults are on the wing from January to April.

== Taxonomy ==
This species was first described by Robert Hoare in 2019. The holotype specimen was collected by J. S. Dugdale at Ball Hut in the Tasman Valley in March and is held in the New Zealand Arthropod Collection.

== Description ==
This species is similar in appearance to the pale form of I. arotis. However the male I. cornuta has long antennae pectinations in comparison to I. arotis and the female I. cornuta lacks the dark scaling that can be found on the thorax of female I. arotis. There are also slight visual differences in the colour patterns on the forewings of the two species. The range of these two species do overlap in such areas as Arthur's Pass and in the Otago Lakes region.

The male I. cornuta has a wingspan of between 34 and 37 mm and the female has a wingspan of between 37 and 40 mm.

== Distribution ==
This species is endemic to New Zealand and is only found in the South Island, in the foothills of the Southern Alps.

== Habitat ==
This species inhabits alpine zones.

== Behaviour ==
The adults of this species are on the wing from January to April.

== Life history and host plants ==
The life history of this species is unknown as are the host species of its larvae.
