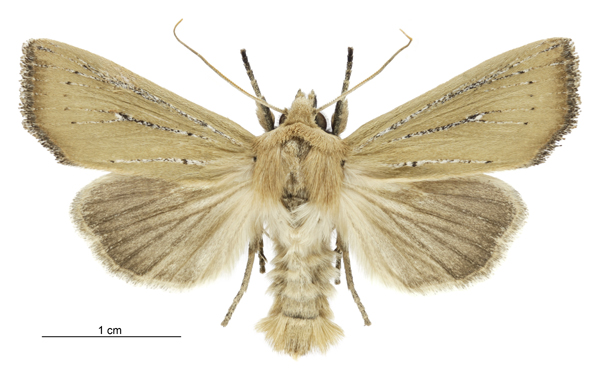
- Male
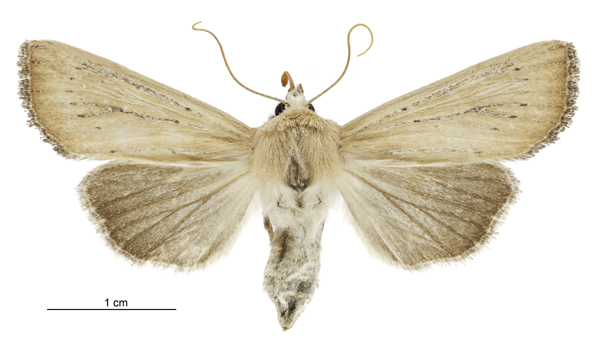
- Female

Scientific classification
- Kingdom: Animalia
- Phylum: Arthropoda
- Clade: Pancrustacea
- Class: Insecta
- Order: Lepidoptera
- Superfamily: Noctuoidea
- Family: Noctuidae
- Genus: Ichneutica
- Species: I. blenheimensis

Binomial name
- Ichneutica blenheimensis (Fereday, 1883)

Synonyms
- Leucania blenheimensis Fereday, 1883; Graphania blenheimensis (Fereday, 1883); Tmetolophota blenheimensis (Fereday, 1883)

= Ichneutica blenheimensis =

Species of moth

Ichneutica blenheimensis is a species of moth in the family Noctuidae. It is endemic to New Zealand and is found throughout the North, South and the Stewart Islands.

This species is classified as "At Risk, Naturally Uncommon" by the Department of Conservation.

== Taxonomy ==
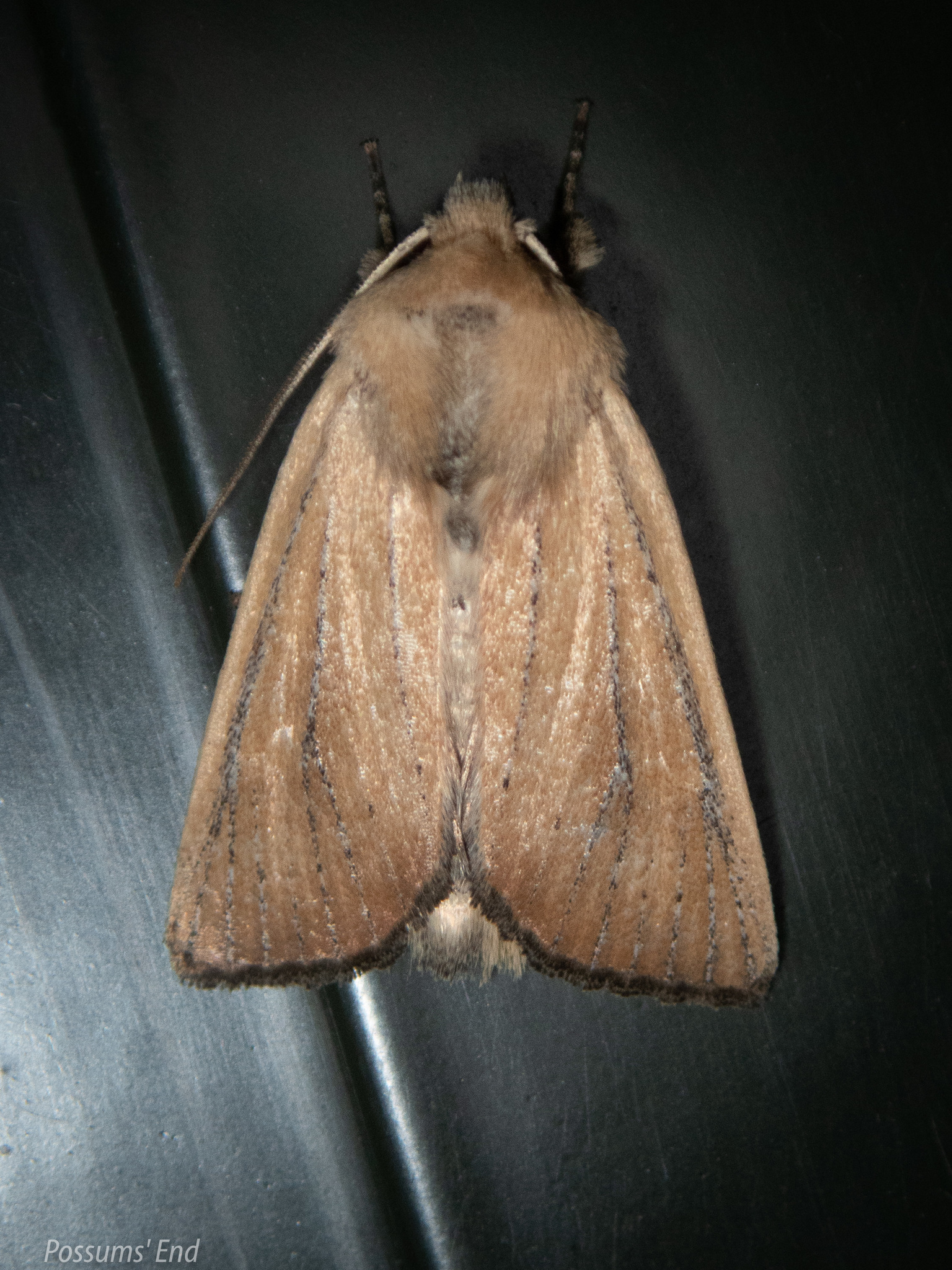
Observation of live Ichneutica blenheimensis

This species was described by Richard William Fereday in 1883 using a female specimen collected by William Skellon in Meanee near Napier. Fereday originally named the species Leucania blenheimensis. In 1887 Edward Meyrick described the male of the species. George Hudson discussed and illustrated this species under this name in both his 1898 and 1928 publications. In 1971 John S. Dugdale transferred all the New Zealand species in the genus Leucania to the genus Tmetolophota. The lectotype specimen is held at the Canterbury Museum. In 2019 Robert Hoare undertook a major review of New Zealand Noctuidae. During this review the genus Ichneutica was greatly expanded and the genus Tmetolophota was subsumed into that genus as a synonym. As a result of this review, this species is now known as Ichneutica blenheimensis.

== Description ==
A. V. Chappell described the egg as follows:

Pale cream; light brownish with brown ring and central spot on the top; dark brown; pale blackish; finely sculptured.

A. V. Chappell also described the larva as follows:

Pale dusky yellow; transparent; numerous stout black hairs rising singly from black spots; head large, pale amber speckled with black.

Hudson described the adults of this species as follows:

The expansion of the wings is about 1 1/2 inches. The fore-wings are cream-coloured with the veins darker; there are three faint black dots at about one-third, a curved series of black dots near the termen, the termen itself being strongly shaded with dark greyish-brown; the cilia are dark greyish- brown. The hind-wings are grey, paler towards the base; the cilia are also grey.

The wingspan of the adult male is between 37 mm and the female wingspan is between 40 and 41 mm. The blackish forewing fringes are diagnostic of this species. Worn specimens of I. arotis can be confused with worn specimens of I. blenheimensis. However I. arotis can be distinguished from I. blenheimensis as it has a scale-tuft on the thorax and dark longitudinal stripes on the tegula.

== Distribution ==
This species is endemic to New Zealand. It is found throughout the North, South and the Stewart Islands. The range of this species covers the Hawkes Bay, Marlborough, Dunedin, Otago Lakes, Southland and the Stewart Island regions. Along with the type locality of Meanee, specimens have also been collected at the Denniston plateau, Blenheim, Dunedin, Lake Wakatipu and Routeburn.

== Biology and behaviour ==
This species is on the wing from November to March. It has been collected via sugar traps and is attracted to light.

== Host species and habitat ==
The host plant for the larvae of this species is likely to be the golden sand sedge pīngao which is now absent from the moths type locality. Chappell states very young larvae eat grass species but more developed larvae consumed Phormium tenax. Based on collections this species appears to prefer drier eastern localities and is rarely collected in western North Island forested areas. It does not appear to be frequently collected in dry inland tussock grassland habitats.

== Conservation status ==
This species has been classified as having the "At Risk, Naturally Uncommon" conservation status under the New Zealand Threat Classification System.
