= Ichneutica haedifrontella =

Conservation status
- Data Deficit (NZ TCS)

Scientific classification
- Kingdom: Animalia
- Phylum: Arthropoda
- Clade: Pancrustacea
- Class: Insecta
- Order: Lepidoptera
- Superfamily: Noctuoidea
- Family: Noctuidae
- Genus: Ichneutica
- Species: I. haedifrontella

Binomial name
- Ichneutica haedifrontella Hoare, 2019

Species of moth

Ichneutica haedifrontella is a moth of the family Noctuidae. This species is endemic to New Zealand. It is only known from scattered areas in the North and South Islands. In the North Island it has only been collected in the Pouakai Range in Taranaki. In the South Island it is known from the Nelson, Buller, North Canterbury, Otago Lakes and Fiordland regions. It inhabits alpine to subalpine zones. The life history of this species is unknown as are the host species of its larvae in the wild. Larvae have been reared on species in the Chionochloa genus. Adults are on the wing from December to February and are attracted to light. This species has a smaller dwarf form that can be found in the Pouakai Range and at Dart Hut. In 2025 this species was classified as "data deficient" under the New Zealand Threat Classification System.

== Taxonomy ==
This species was first described by Robert Hoare in 2019. The male holotype specimen was collected at Dart Hut in the Mount Aspiring National Park in February by J. S. Dugdale and Kenneth John Fox. This specimen is held in the New Zealand Arthropod Collection.

== Description ==
The male adults of this species have a wingspan of between 31 and 36 mm and the female of between 33 and 39 mm. It can be distinguished from its near, and very similar in appearance, relative I. epiastra by the short and blunt frontal protuberances on its head. This is the only eternal character that assists with distinguishing between the two species although the male genitalia of I. haedifrontella is distinct. Like its close relative I. epistra, I. haedifrontella also has a dwarf form, the adults of which have a wingspan of between 31 and 33 mm. The markings on the forewings of this dwarf form are less obvious. All known dwarf forms have been collected in the Pouakai Range and at Dart Hut.

== Distribution ==
This species is endemic to New Zealand. It is only known from scattered areas in the North and South Islands. In the North Island it has only been collected in the Pouakai Range in Taranaki. In the South Island it is known from the Nelson, Buller, North Canterbury, Otago Lakes and Fiordland regions.

== Habitat ==
This species is known to inhabit the alpine and subalpine zones.

== Behaviour ==
Adults of this species are on the wing from December to February and are attracted to light.

== Life history and host species ==
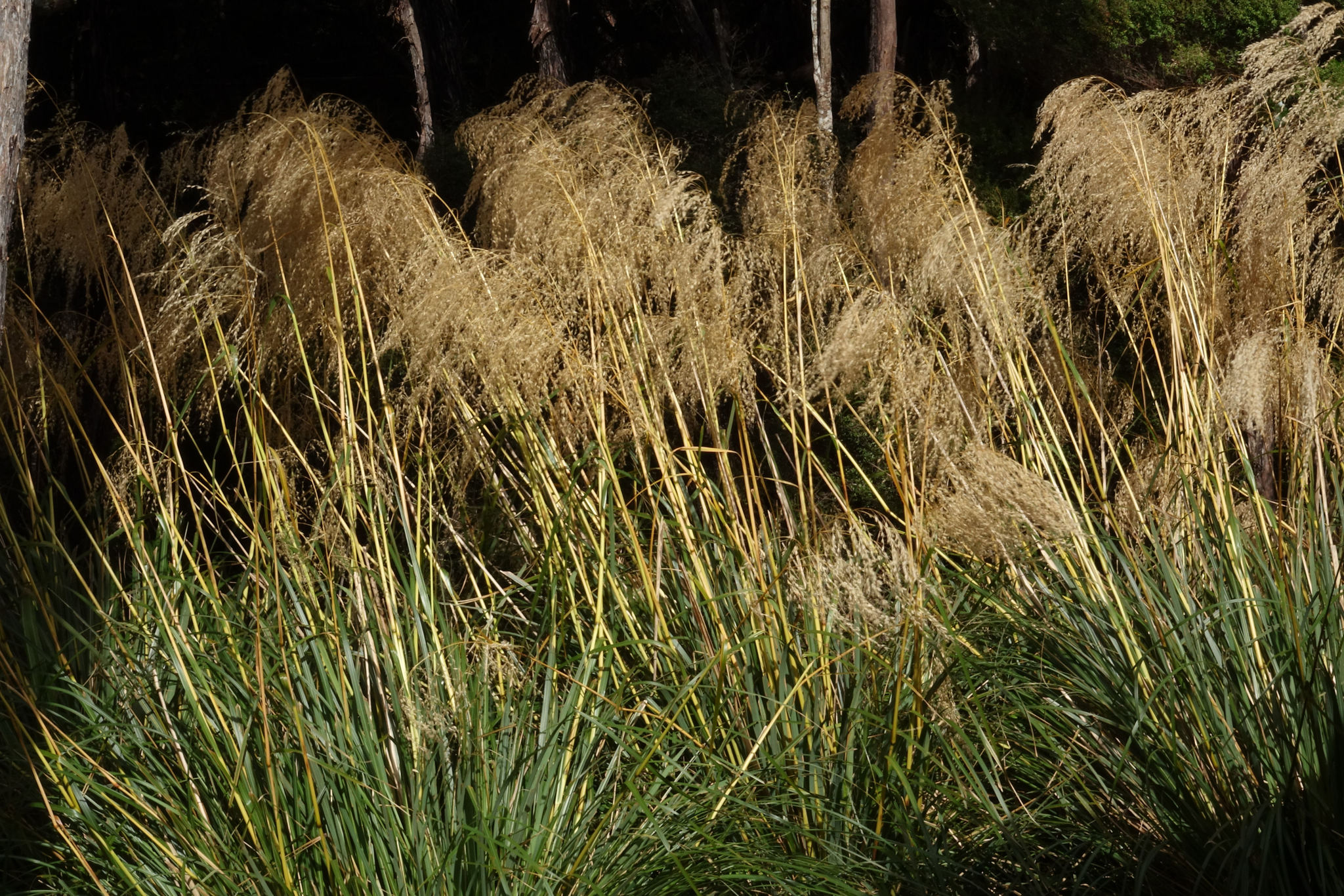
Larvae of I. haedifrontella have been raised on this species, Chionochloa conspicua

The life history of this species is unknown as are the host species of its larvae in the wild. Larvae of this species have been raised in captivity on Chionochloa species including Chionochloa conspicua.

== Conservation status ==
In 2025 this species was classified by the New Zealand Department of Conservation as "data deficient" under the New Zealand Threat Classification System. Data on this species is poor as the species is difficult to identify.
