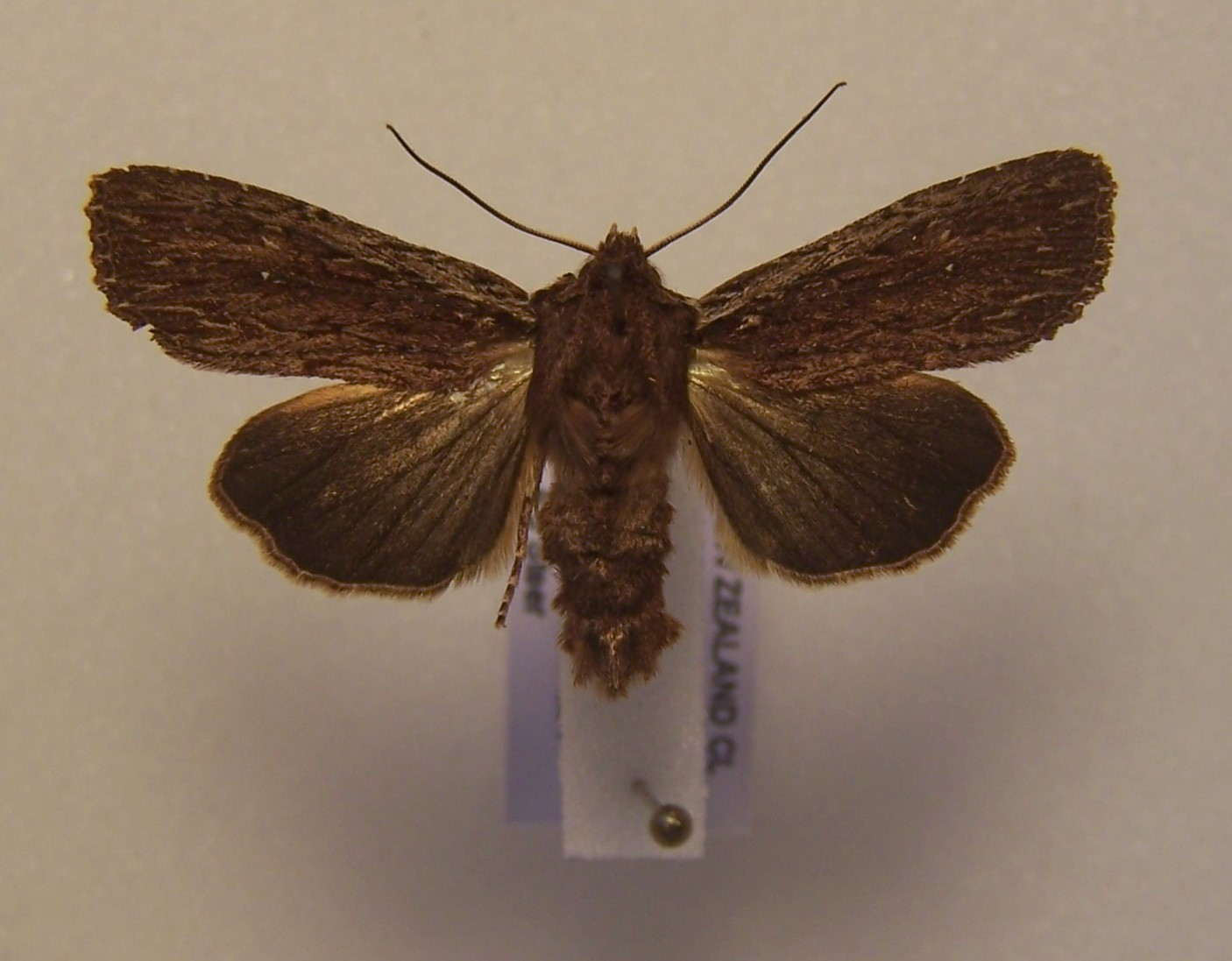
- Ichneutica inscripta specimen found on the Coromandel Peninsula

Scientific classification
- Kingdom: Animalia
- Phylum: Arthropoda
- Clade: Pancrustacea
- Class: Insecta
- Order: Lepidoptera
- Superfamily: Noctuoidea
- Family: Noctuidae
- Genus: Ichneutica
- Species: I. inscripta

Binomial name
- Ichneutica inscripta Hoare, 2019

= Ichneutica inscripta =

Species of moth

Ichneutica inscripta is a moth of the family Noctuidae. This species is endemic to New Zealand. This species is found from south Auckland to Taranaki in the North Island. It prefers to inhabit dense native forest with high rainfall at higher altitudes. The life history of this species is unconfirmed as are the host species of its larvae but is likely to be similar to its close relative I. infensa. This species is very similar in appearance to its close relative I. infensa but has more strongly patterned forewings. The adults of this species are on the wing from late October to January.

== Taxonomy ==
This species was first described by Robert Hoare in 2019. The male holotype was collected at Waitaanga Plateau in Taranaki and is held in the New Zealand Arthropod Collection.

== Description ==
The wingspan of the adult male is between 36 and 39 mm and for the adult female is between 36 mm. This species is very similar in appearance to its close relative I. infensa but has more strongly patterned forewings. Its abdomen has a reduced brush which is associated with rudimentary Stobbe’s glands, pheromone producing glands found on the second abdominal segment of the male moth. I. infensa has fully developed Stobbe's glands and differences also exist in the male genitalia of the two species.

== Distribution ==
This species is endemic to New Zealand. This species is found from south Auckland to Taranaki in the North Island.

== Habitat ==
This species prefers to inhabit dense native forest with high rainfall. It appears to prefer higher altitudes.

== Behaviour ==
The adults of this species are on the wing from late October to January.

== Life history and host species ==
The life history of this species is unconfirmed as are the host species of its larvae but is likely to be similar to its close relative I. infensa.
