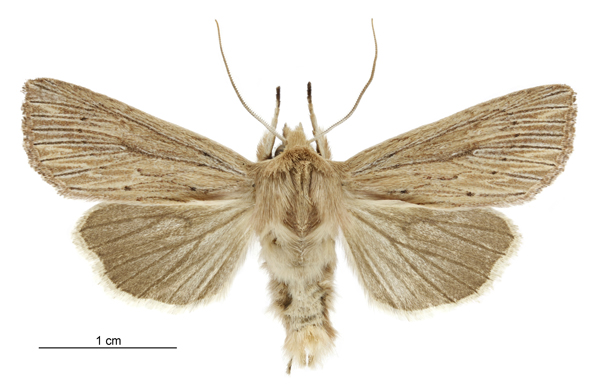
- Male
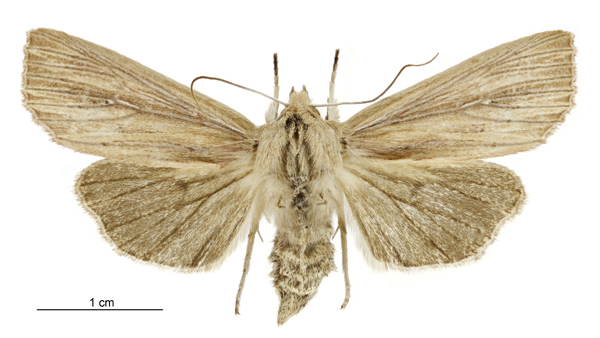
- Female

Scientific classification
- Kingdom: Animalia
- Phylum: Arthropoda
- Clade: Pancrustacea
- Class: Insecta
- Order: Lepidoptera
- Superfamily: Noctuoidea
- Family: Noctuidae
- Genus: Ichneutica
- Species: I. arotis

Binomial name
- Ichneutica arotis (Meyrick, 1887)

Synonyms
- Leucania arotis Meyrick, 1887; Persectania arotis (Meyrick, 1887); Persectania aulacias (Meyrick, 1887); Tmetolophota arotis (Meyrick, 1887); Leucania aulacias Meyrick, 1887; Leucania obsoleta Howes, 1906; Leucania innotata Howes, 1908; Graphania arotis (Meyrick, 1887); Graphania aulacias (Meyrick, 1887); Graphania obsoleta (Howes, 1906); Graphania innotata (Howes, 1908)

= Ichneutica arotis =

Species of moth

Ichneutica arotis is a moth of the family Noctuidae. It is endemic to New Zealand. This species is found throughout the North and South Islands but has yet to be recorded on Stewart Island. I. arotis is variable in appearance and have been described as having a "northern dark form", a "typical" form and a "swamp" form. Robert Hoare hypothesised that this species may be in the process of evolving into several distinct species. However, as these forms show no difference in antennae or genitalia so, as at 2019, they are not regarded as separate species. Larval hosts include species in the genera Cortaderia and Schoenus as well as Phormium tenax. The caterpillar feeds at night and rests in during the day amongst dead flax leaves. It pupates in a loose cocoon either hidden at the base of a stem of flax or on the ground. The adults of this species is on the wing from September to April. In the North Island there have also been records of adults being on the wing in June to August.

I. arotis can be confused with I. blenheimensis, I. theobroma, or I. epiastra, and the female of I. arotis can possibly be confused with the female of I. cornuta. I. blenheimensis can be distinguished as even when worn and pale it has blackish forewing fringes that I. arotis lack. I. theobroma might possibly be confused with the "northern dark" form of I. arotis but can be distinguished as I. theobroma has broader wings and doesn't have the pale markings on the forewing that the "northern dark" form of I. arotis has. I. epiastra can be distinguished as it has an obvious row of black dots along the outer margin of the wing where as I. arotis is either lacks these marks or has brown dashes. The female I. arotis can be distinguished from the female I. cornuta as the former normally has dark scales on the thorax.

== Taxonomy ==
This species was first described by Edward Meyrick in 1887 from specimens collected in Blenheim, Christchurch and Rakaia in November and December. Meyrick originally named the species Leucania arotis. The male lectotype specimen is held at the Canterbury Museum. Meyrick thinking he was describing a separate species also named this species as Leucania aulacias. Despite this name being the first in the publication George Hudson in his 1898 publication New Zealand moths and butterflies (Macro-lepidoptera) gave priority to the name arotis. This is regarded as legitimate as Hudson was the first reviser.

In 1988 J. S. Dugdale, in his catalogue of New Zealand Lepidoptera, placed this species within the genus Tmetolophota. In 2019 Robert Hoare undertook a major review of New Zealand Noctuidae. During this review the genus Ichneutica was greatly expanded and the genus Tmetolophota was subsumed into that genus as a synonym. As a result of this review, this species is now known as Ichneutica arotis.

Hoare argues that given the variability of this species and its difference forms detailed observations on early life stages of this species, its host plants and genetics are needed to work out whether the different forms of this species should be given species status.

== Description ==
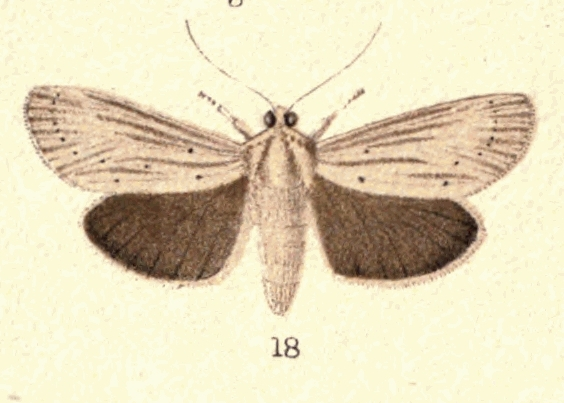
Drawing of I. arotis by George Hudson in New Zealand Moths and Butterflies (1898)

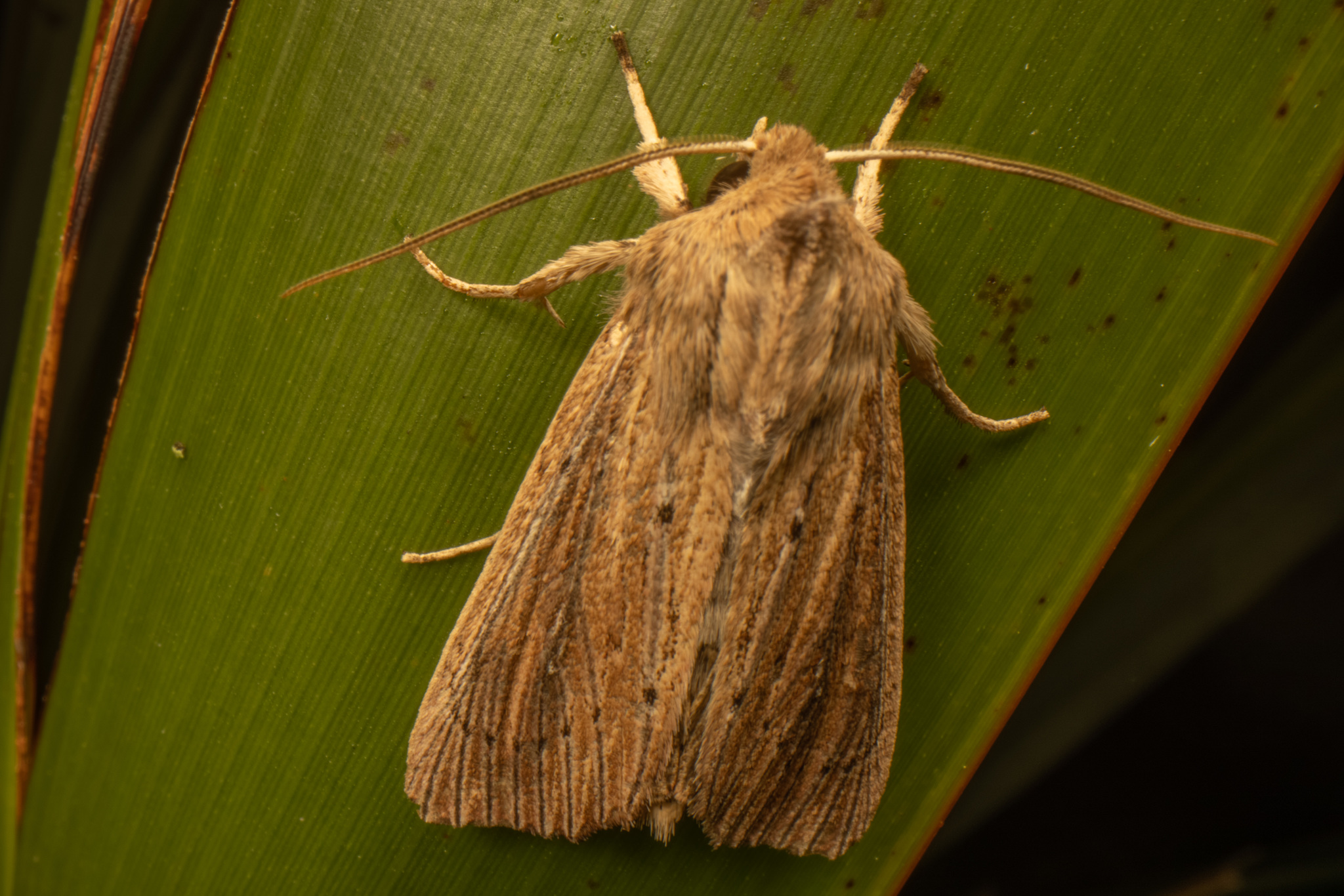
Ichneutica arotis on flax

Hudson described the egg of this species as follows:

The egg, which is laid upright, is almost round, flattened beneath, white; with many prominent longitudinal ribs, a series of transverse striations connecting each rib. The micropyle and ring around it become brown as the egg develops.

Hudson described the larva of this species as follows:

Length of the full grown larva is about 1 13/4 inches (45 mm). Cylindrical, moderately stout, tapering strongly at both extremities, but most posteriorly. General colour dull reddish-ochreous, with numerous darker, slightly wavy, longitudinal lines. Head ochreous, with fine blackish markings. A double, slender brownish-red dorsal line, with pale interspace, very conspicuous; a similar, but slightly fainter subdorsal line; lateral area darker through being crowded with numerous irregular brownish strigulae; a row of rather conspicuous black dots on lateral area just above spiracles; spiracles whitish, ringed with blackish, small and inconspicuous; no definite markings below spiracular line. Undersurface, legs and prolegs paler and duller, very slightly tinged with faint greenish-grey. Younger larvae have the general colouring paler.

Meyrick originally described adults of this species as follows:

Male, female. — 39-42 mm. Thorax tolerably crested anteriorly; submedian streak not traceable; cilia of forewings whitish-ochreous, sprinkled with fuscous and blackish, of hindwings white, with indications of a grey line : all else as in L. aulacias.

Hudson described adult of the species as follows:

The expansion of the wings is about 1 1/2 inches. The fore-wings are cream-colour with the veins finely marked in grey; there is a series of streaks of darker cream-colour between the veins, and a row of minute black dots near the termen; the cilia are cream-colour. The hind-wings are dark grey with the cilia white.

This species is variable with Hoare describing a "typical" form, a "northern dark form" and a "swamp" form. The wingspan of the typical adult male of this species is between 31 and 41 mm and for the female is between 35 and 46 mm. The wingspan of the northern dark form for the male is between 40 and 45 mm and for the female is between 41 and 44 mm. The swamp form is smaller with the wingspan of the male being between 33 and 37 mm and the female between 31 and 32 mm). Hoare hypothesised that this variability may indicated that the species may be evolving into several distinct species. However although variable in appearance these forms show no difference in antennae or genitalia and so, as at 2019, are not regarded as separate species.

I. arotis can be confused with I. blenheimensis, I. theobroma, or I. epiastra, and the female I. arotis can possibly be confused with the female I. cornuta. I. blenheimensis can be distinguished as even when worn and pale it has blackish forewing fringes that I. arotis lack. I. theobroma might possibly be confused with the "northern dark" form of I. arotis but can be distinguished as I. theobroma has broader wings and doesn't have the pale markings on the forewing that the "northern dark" form of I. arotis has. I. epiastra can be distinguished as it has an obvious row of black dots along the outer margin of the wing where as I. arotis is either lacks these marks or has brown dashes. The female I. arotis can be distinguished from the female I. cornuta as the former normally has dark scales on the thorax.

== Distribution ==
It is endemic to New Zealand. This species is found throughout the North and South Islands but has yet to be recorded on Stewart Island.

== Behaviour ==
This species is on the wing from September to April. In the North Island there have also been records of adults being on the wing in June to August. They are attracted to light and have been collected via a mercury vapour light trap.

== Life history and host species ==
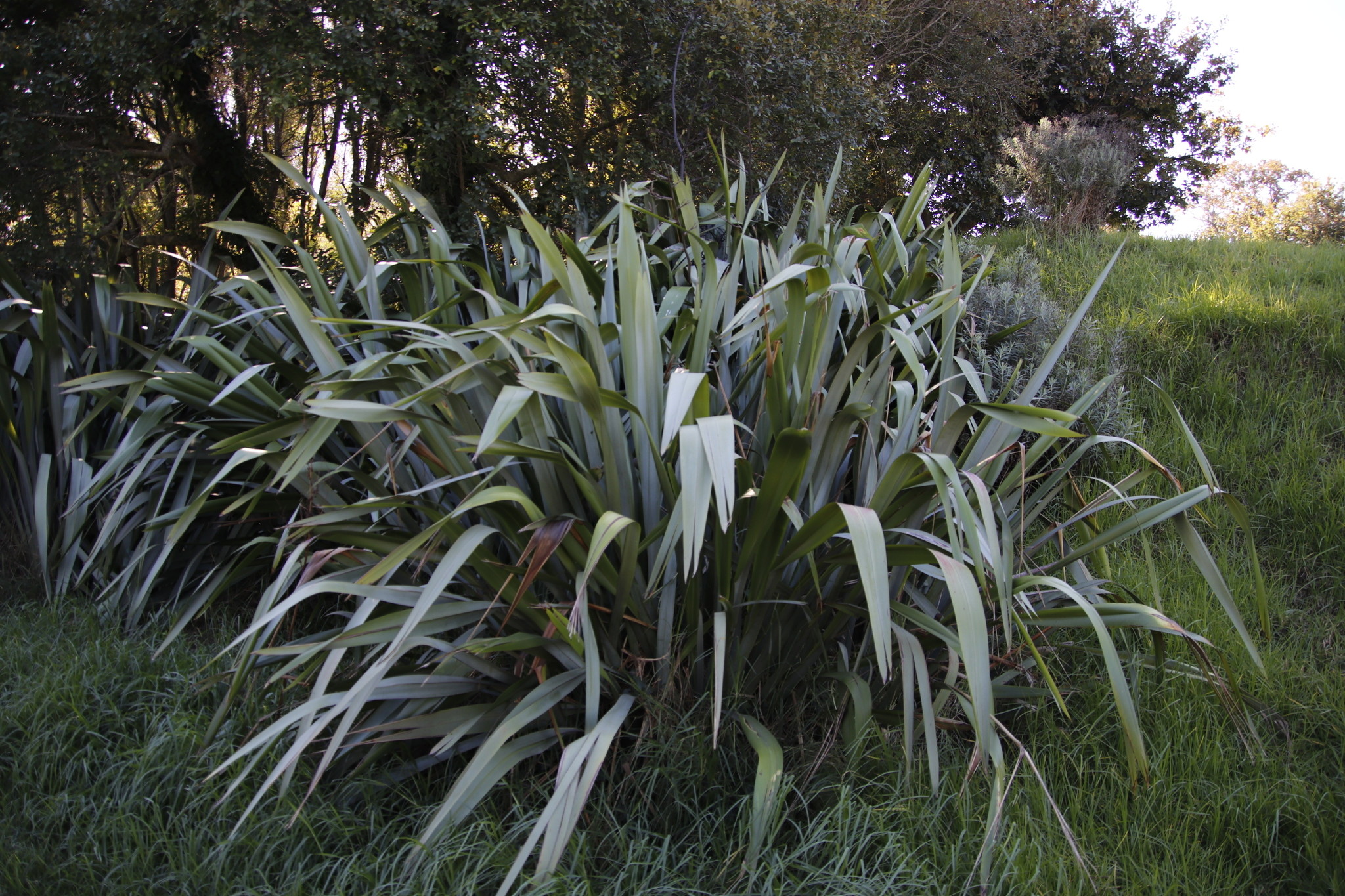
Phormium tenax, larval host species of I. arotis

This species has been reared in captivity on stems of species within the genus Cortaderia. Species in the Schoenus genus might also be larval host plants. Larvae have been confirmed to feed on Phormium tenax in the wild. The caterpillar feeds at night and rests in during the day amongst dead flax leaves. This species pupates in a loose cocoon either hidden at the base of a stem of flax or on the ground.
