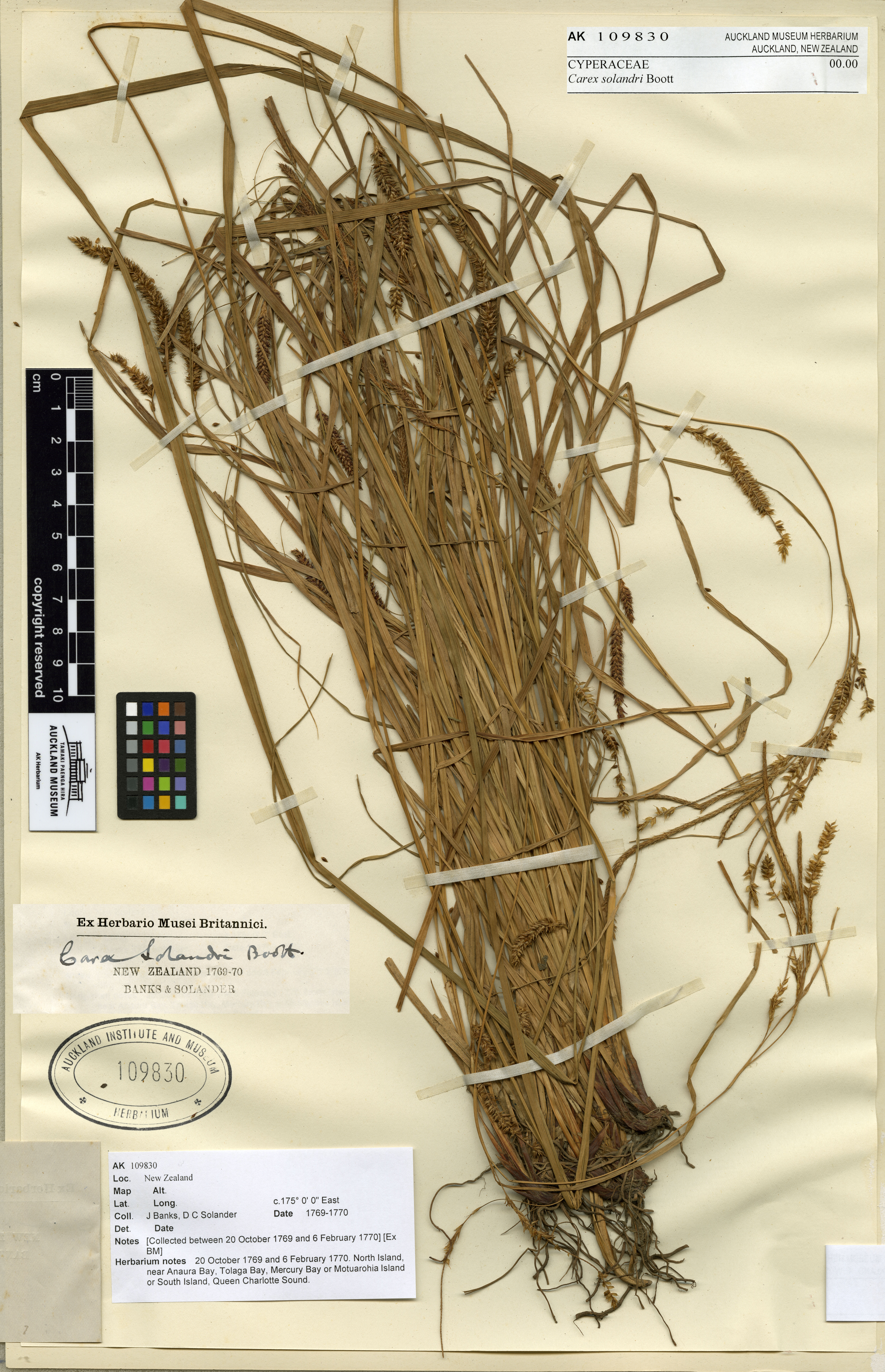
- Auckland Museum specimen (AM AK109830)

Scientific classification
- Kingdom: Plantae
- Clade: Tracheophytes
- Clade: Angiosperms
- Clade: Monocots
- Clade: Commelinids
- Order: Poales
- Family: Cyperaceae
- Genus: Carex
- Species: C. solandri

Binomial name
- Carex solandri Boott

= Carex solandri =

Species of grass-like plant

Carex solandri is a species of sedge that was first described by Francis Boott in 1853.

It is endemic to both the North and South Islands of New Zealand.

== Taxonomy & naming ==
This plant was first described in 1853 by Francis Boott. Its specific epithet, solandri (originally Solandri), honours Daniel Solander who (with Joseph Banks) collected one of the specimens used by Boott in describing the species.

== Conservation status ==
In 2017 de Lange and others declared it to be "not threatened" under the New Zealand Threat Classification System (NZTCS).
