= Richard William Fereday =

New Zealand lawyer, entomologist, and artist

Richard William Fereday (c. 1820–30 August 1899) was a New Zealand lawyer, entomologist and artist.

== Early life ==
He was born in Ettingshall, Staffordshire, England in 1820 to John Turton Fereday, an ironmaster and his wife, Ann Cecilia Heming.

He married Mary Ann Parker Purcell on March 15 1851 and they emigrated to New Zealand in 1862. Feredey was admitted as barrister and solicitor in 1864 and practiced in Christchurch, becoming an inaugural member of the Canterbury District Law Society where he served as vice president from 1885 to 1888.

== Entomology ==
Fereday was also known for his entomology work, publishing his first paper London in 1867. He collected species of moths and butterflies, sending specimens to scientists in Europe. In his last published paper he listed 616 New Zealand species. Fereday was an advocate for using inspectors to control for pests in incoming goods and was also a strong advocate for importing bumblebees to improve pollination in clover species. Bees were released in Christchurch in 1855 be became established thereafter.

He died on August 30, 1899. The Dictionary of New Zealand Biography stated that "Fereday had been one of those enthusiastic amateurs who made a considerable contribution to science in nineteenth century New Zealand."
