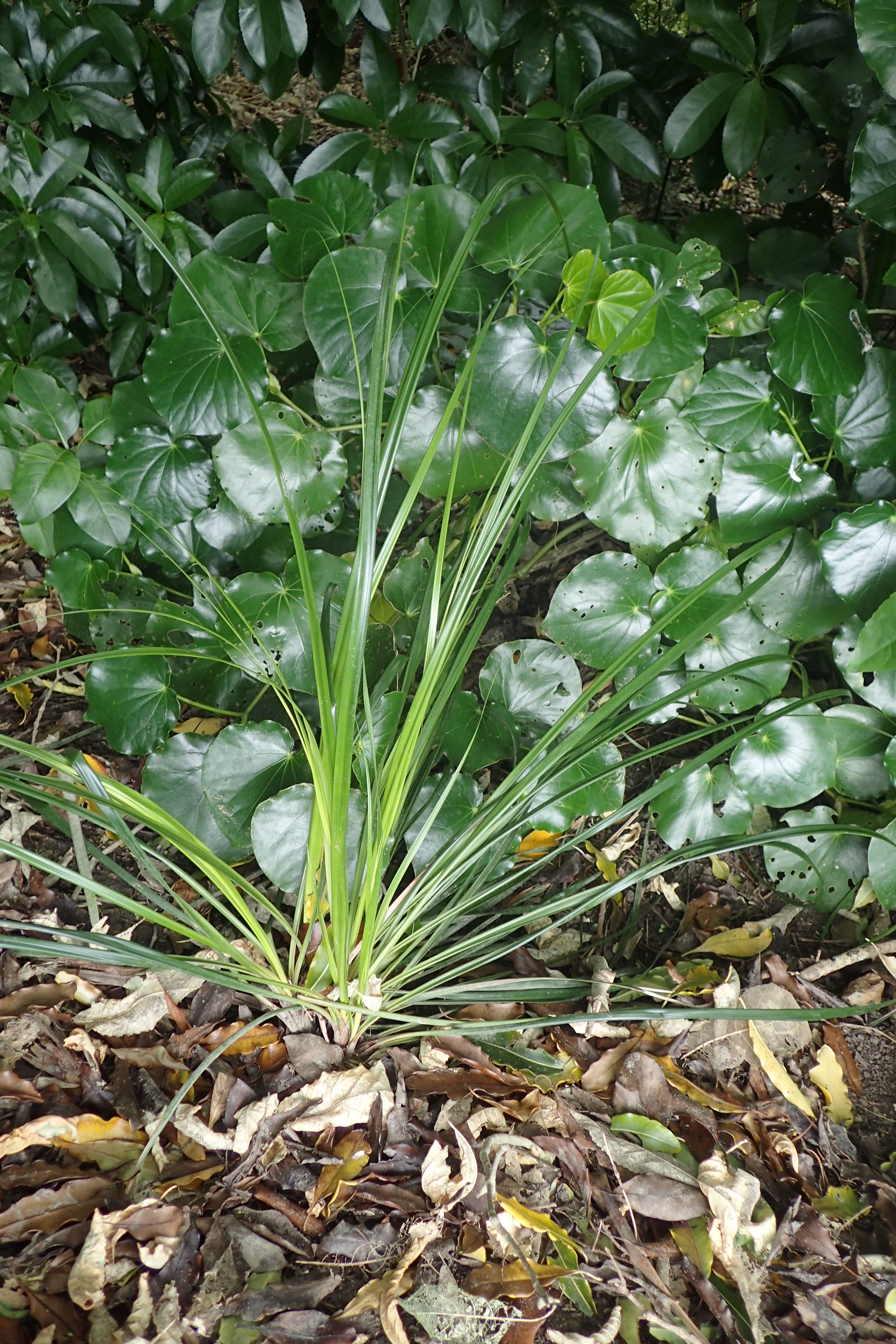

Scientific classification
- Kingdom: Plantae
- Clade: Tracheophytes
- Clade: Angiosperms
- Clade: Monocots
- Clade: Commelinids
- Order: Poales
- Family: Cyperaceae
- Genus: Gahnia
- Species: G. xanthocarpa

Binomial name
- Gahnia xanthocarpa (Hook.f.) Hook.f., 1864

= Gahnia xanthocarpa =

Species of plant

Gahnia xanthocarpa is a tussock-forming perennial in the family Cyperaceae, that is native to New Zealand.
