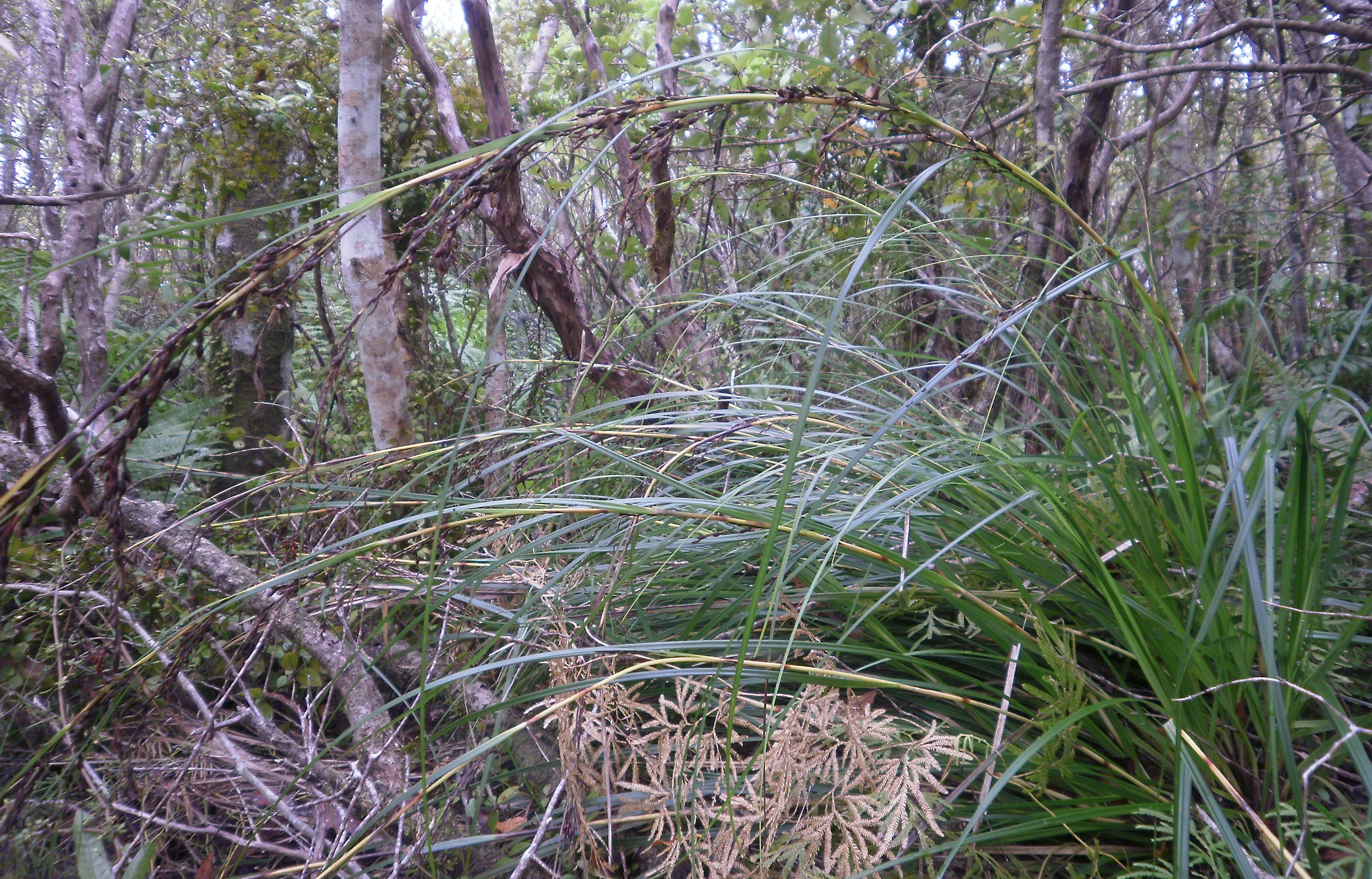

Scientific classification
- Kingdom: Plantae
- Clade: Tracheophytes
- Clade: Angiosperms
- Clade: Monocots
- Clade: Commelinids
- Order: Poales
- Family: Cyperaceae
- Genus: Gahnia
- Species: G. setifolia

Binomial name
- Gahnia setifolia (A.Rich.) Hook.f.

Synonyms
- Lampocarya setifolia A.Rich.

= Gahnia setifolia =

Species of grass-like plant

Gahnia setifolia, commonly known as mapere, gahnia, giant gahnia, or razor sedge is a native sedge of New Zealand. It is found throughout the North Island and top of the South Island of New Zealand.
