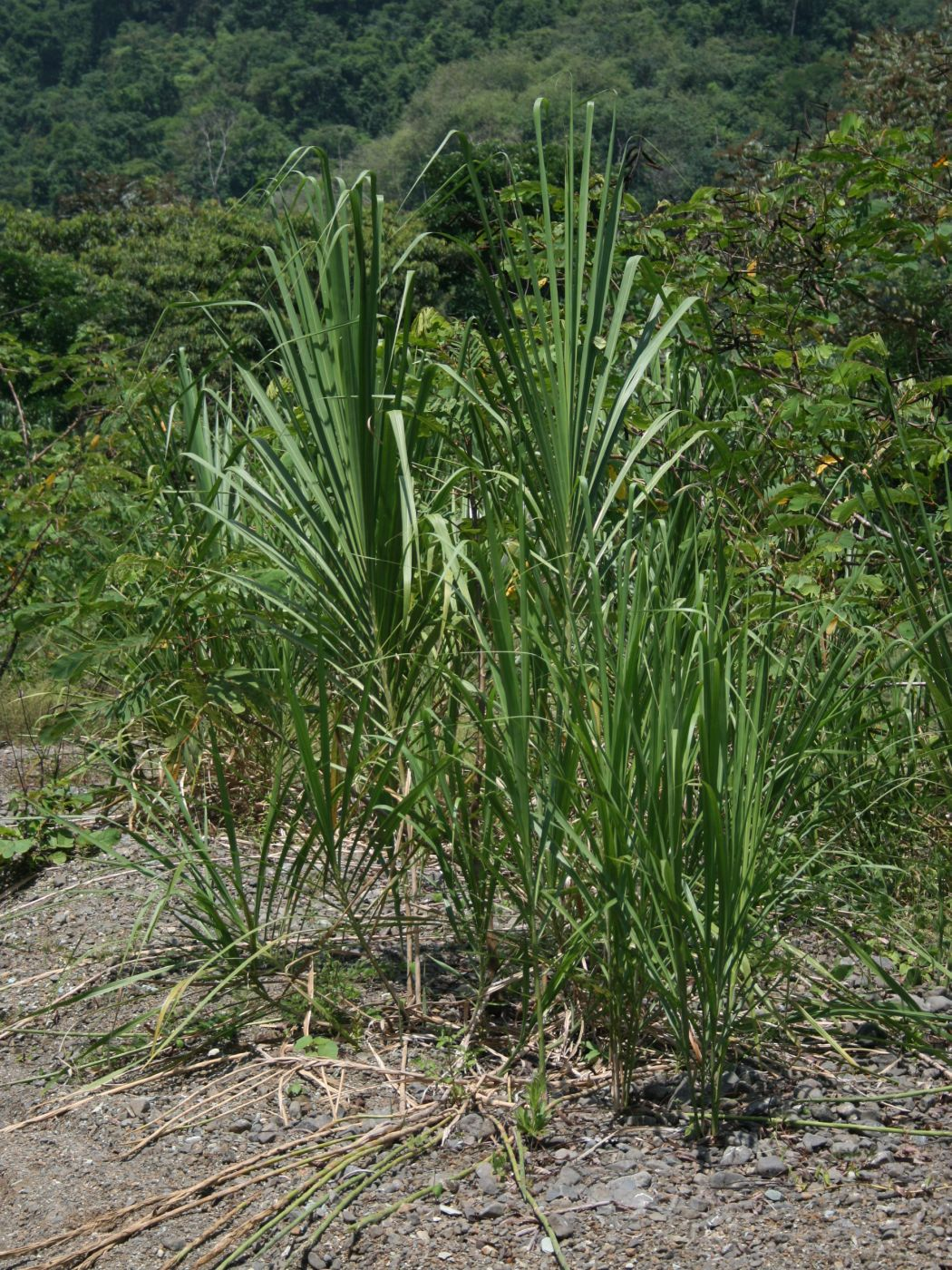

Scientific classification
- Kingdom: Plantae
- Clade: Tracheophytes
- Clade: Angiosperms
- Clade: Monocots
- Clade: Commelinids
- Order: Poales
- Family: Poaceae
- Clade: PACMAD clade
- Subfamily: Panicoideae
- Tribe: Gynerieae; Sánchez-Ken & L.G. Clark (2001)
- Genus: Gynerium; Willd. ex P. Beauv. 1812 not Bonpl. 1813
- Species: G. sagittatum

Binomial name
- Gynerium sagittatum (Aubl.) P.Beauv.

Synonyms
- Saccharum sagittatum Aubl.; Arundo sagittata (Aubl.) Pers.; Arundo rugii Molina; Gynerium procerum P.Beauv.; Gynerium saccharoides Humb. & Bonpl.; Arundo saccharoides (Humb. & Bonpl.) Poir.; Cynodon gynerium Raspail; Gynerium parviflorum Nees; Arundo fastuosa Willd. ex Steud.; Aira gigantea Steud.; Gynerium levyi E.Fourn.

= Gynerium =

Genus of plants

Gynerium is a monotypic genus of Neotropical plants in the grass family, native to Mexico and Colombia, Central America, South America, and the West Indies. It is classified in its own tribe Gynerieae.

The sole species in the genus is Gynerium sagittatum, a tall grass that grows up to six metres (twenty feet) high. It is a very vigorous species that grows into a considerably dense mass of vegetation. The species is known as "cana-do-rio", "cana-flecha", "cana-frecha", "ubá" and "cana-brava" in Brazil, "caña brava" in Peru and Colombia, "chuchío" in eastern Bolivia, and "tañil" in Guatemala and other Spanish speaking countries. It is known in English as "wildcane" or "wild cane", while "arrow cane" is less common (sagitta is Latin for arrow).

== Description ==
The stems are straight and erect, the lower part is covered with "vainas" from the fallen leaves, while in the middle part the leaves are arranged in fan shaped groups. The upper part, round and thin, stiff on the outside and soft on the inside, develops a large bloom at the top.

There are many varieties in the plant's stems. The bark zone, which is the main factor in the unusual height, functions as a water distribution system, transporting water from the underground roots to the superior part of the plant including the leaves. This vital function occurs at any season of the year.

== Ecology ==
Being one of the first plants to colonise open areas, G. sagittatum is an important pioneer species that reaches new sites via wind-distributed seeds. Once established, it spreads vegetatively, and is found usually near rivers and lakes, and even beaches.

== Uses ==
- In Colombia its straw is used to create different accessories including the traditional sombrero vueltiao, symbol of Colombia.
- In Brazil, the lower and middle parts are used in cheap or improvised fences, and in cheap trellises for climbing plants and cultivation of tomato. The upper part, with the bloom at the top, is sometimes used in decoration. The more homogeneous section of the upper part is used to make arrows and birds cages.

== Diversity ==
Species

The only known species is Gynerium sagittatum, widespread from northern Mexico to Paraguay.

Varieties

Three varieties are recognized:

- Gynerium sagittatum var. glabrum Renvoize & Kalliola - Bolivia
- Gynerium sagittatum var. sagittatum - from northern Mexico to Paraguay
- Gynerium sagittatum var. subandinum Renvoize & Kalliola - Bolivia

formerly included

see Austroderia Cortaderia Chusquea

- Gynerium argenteum - Cortaderia selloana
- Gynerium atacamense - Cortaderia atacamensis
- Gynerium columbianum - Cortaderia columbiana
- Gynerium dioicum - Cortaderia selloana
- Gynerium elegans - Cortaderia selloana
- Gynerium jubatum - Cortaderia jubata
- Gynerium modestum - Cortaderia modesta
- Gynerium nanum - Cortaderia pilosa
- Gynerium neesii - Cortaderia jubata
- Gynerium nitidum - Cortaderia nitida
- Gynerium pilosum - Cortaderia pilosa
- Gynerium purpureum - Cortaderia selloana
- Gynerium pygmaeum - Cortaderia jubata
- Gynerium quila - Chusquea quila
- Gynerium ramosum - Cortaderia modesta
- Gynerium rudiusculum - Cortaderia rudiuscula
- Gynerium speciosum - Cortaderia speciosa
- Gynerium zeelandicum - Austroderia richardii
