= Pampas grass =

Pampas grass or pampas-grass or Pap's grass is a common name which may refer to any of several similar-looking, tall-growing species of grass:

- Species of Cortaderia including:

- Cortaderia selloana and its selected cultivars
- Cortaderia jubata (Andean pampas grass, purple pampas grass)

- Erianthus ravennae (syn. Saccharum ravennae) (giant woolly-beard grass, hardy pampas grass, Ravenna grass, ekra)
- Miscanthus sinensis (Japanese pampas grass)
