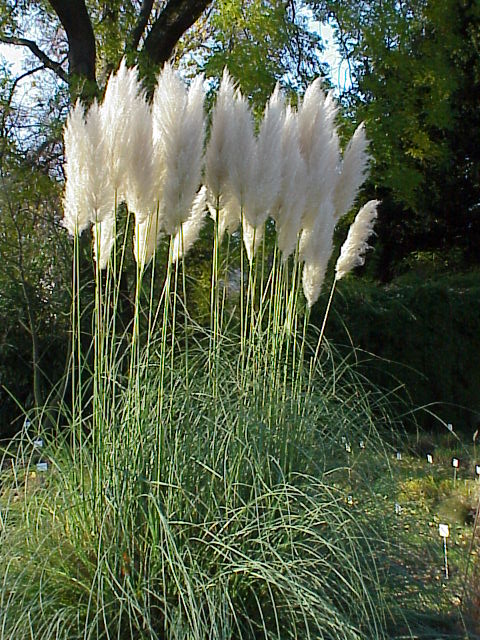
- Cortaderia selloana pampas grass

Scientific classification
- Kingdom: Plantae
- Clade: Tracheophytes
- Clade: Angiosperms
- Clade: Monocots
- Clade: Commelinids
- Order: Poales
- Family: Poaceae
- Subfamily: Danthonioideae
- Tribe: Danthonieae
- Genus: Cortaderia; Stapf

Type species
- Cortaderia argentea (Nees) Stapf

Synonyms
- Lamprothyrsus Pilg; Moorea Lem.

= Cortaderia =

Genus of grasses

Cortaderia is a genus of plants in the Poaceae or grass family of plants.

All current species included in the Cortaderia genus are native to South and Central America, ranging from the Patagonia region of southern Chile and Argentina, to Costa Rica. For many years, five species native to New Zealand were included in the genus, but since 2011 these have been since reclassified into the genus Austroderia containing only species native to New Zealand.

== Etymology ==
The common name pampas grass, though strictly referring to C. selloana, is frequently applied to all species in the genus, as well as the five former members reclassied into the genus Austroderia (sometimes also to species of Erianthus and Saccharum ravennae). The name of the genus is derived from the Argentine Spanish word cortadera, which in turn refers to the sharp serrations on the leaves. Cortaderia jubata and C. rudiuscula produce copious seed asexually.

== Description ==
Cortaderia species are perennial grasses, characterised by robust culms and feathery inflorescent plumes held high above the foliage.Some species are relatively short, forming rounded hedgehog-like clumps less than 0.5 m tall, but many species, including Cortaderia selloana and Cortaderia jubata form wide tussocks, up to 4 m tall. Rhizomes or stolons are rare but some species, particularly the taller species, can form tussocks almost as wide as their height.

Across South America, the genus is a major component of the C3 temperate grasslands, from Tierra del Fuego in the far south, north to Venezuela (with some species extending to Costa Rica). They can be found from the Serro do Mar Atlantic coastal mountains near Rio de Janeiro to the Andes in Ecuador. At the southern extreme, species naturally grow at sea level, and in the Andes, certain species can be found growing up to 4500 m at the equator, where they make up a major component of paramo habitat.

== Cultivation ==
=== Horticulture ===
Several species of Cortaderia have been extensively planted in gardens or cultivated landscapes around the world, particularly Cortaderia selloana, having been planted as an ornamental garden plant outside of South America since the 19th century.

Many varieties or selections of Cortaderia selloana are or have been available, including variegated, silver leaved and dwarf varieties. The following varieties have received an Award of Garden Merit (AGM) by the Royal Horticultural Society (RHS): 'Silver Feather', 'Pumila', 'Patagonia', 'Montrosa', 'Evita', 'Aureolineata', and 'Sunningdale Silver'.

=== Non-ornamental uses ===
Cortaderia jubata, and to a lesser extent Cortaderia selloana, can be used as green forage during dry summer months being able to be grazed to 30-50cm of the plant's base and be used as a substitute for hay, with plants having been used in the past for forage in New Zealand and California. Both species have also been used as a means of erosion control and planted as a windbreak and to provide shelter.

=== As invasive species ===
Cortaderia selloana and Cortaderia jubata are considered invasive species in several disjunct parts of the world, capable of forming dense, often impenetrable, stands, and can damage grazing lands, interfere with afforested areas, affect visibility on roads and hinder access to certain natural areas, such as the margins of streams. In parts of the world with high forest or bush fire risk, the build up and slow decomposition of leaf litter and standing dead leaves produce large amounts of flammable material and increase fire-related hazards.

In regions where either species is considered invasive, plants are able to rapidly colonize areas, including grassland plains, dunes, sparse shrublands and riverine habitats, particularly those that have been disturbed or altered by humans in the past, such as disused farmland or afforested land.

Cortaderia selloana is considered invasive on the Atlantic coast of Europe across an 'Atlantic arc' ranging from Portugal to France, particularly in the Cantabria province of Spain. In California, it is recorded as having colonized land in at least 19 counties. It also occurs in many Micronesian islands, South Africa and Hawaiian islands, being classed as a noxious species in New Zealand and some states of Australia. It is one of the emerging invasive species with the greatest potential range in South Africa, Lesotho and Swaziland, especially in grasslands.

Cordateria jubata, has similarly escaped from cultivation and become problematic especially in Australia, South Africa, New Zealand and parts of the United States. C. jubata is listed as a noxious weed in California, Hawaii and Oregon, and as a grade 1 invasive species in South Africa.

=== List of Cortaderia species ===
Currently accepted species

- Cortaderia araucana Stapf - Chile, Argentina
- Cortaderia atacamensis (Phil.) Pilg. - Chile, Argentina, Bolivia
- Cortaderia bifida Pilg. - Costa Rica, Panama, Venezuela, Colombia, Ecuador, Peru, Bolivia
- Cortaderia boliviensis M.Lyle - Bolivia
- Cortaderia columbiana (Pilg.) Pilg. - Venezuela, Colombia
- Cortaderia hapalotricha (Pilg.) Conert - Costa Rica, Panama, Venezuela, Colombia, Ecuador, Peru, Bolivia
- Cortaderia hieronymi (Kuntze) N.P.Barker & H.P.Linder - Bolivia, Peru, Argentina
- Cortaderia jubata (Lemoine ex Carrière) Stapf – Andean pampas grass - Andes of Colombia, Ecuador, Peru, Bolivia, Argentina; naturalized in Australia, New Zealand, South Africa, Oregon, California, Hawaii
- Cortaderia modesta (Döll) Hack. ex Dusén - southern Brazil
- Cortaderia nitida (Kunth) Pilg. - Costa Rica, Venezuela, Colombia, Ecuador, Peru
- Cortaderia peruviana (Hitchc.) N.P.Barker & H.P.Linder - Ecuador, Peru, Bolivia
- Cortaderia pilosa (d'Urv.) Hack. - Chile, Argentina, Falkland Islands
- Cortaderia planifolia Swallen - Colombia, Peru
- Cortaderia pungens Swallen - Colombia, Peru, Venezuela
- Cortaderia roraimensis (N.E.Br.) Pilg. - Guyana, Venezuela, Colombia, northwestern Brazil
- Cortaderia rudiuscula Stapf - Andes of Chile, Argentina, Peru, Bolivia
- Cortaderia selloana (Schult. & Schult.f.) Asch. & Graebn. – pampas grass - Chile, Argentina, Paraguay, Uruguay, Bolivia; naturalized in parts of northern South America, Mesoamerica, West Indies, southern USA, Australia, New Zealand, Mediterranean Basin, etc.
- Cortaderia sericantha (Steud.) Hitchc. - Colombia, Peru
- Cortaderia speciosa (Nees) Stapf - Chile, Argentina, Bolivia
- Cortaderia vaginata Swallen - southern Brazil

Formerly included species

see Austroderia Chionochloa Chusquea Phragmites

- Cortaderia archboldii - Chionochloa archboldii
- Cortaderia conspicua - Chionochloa conspicua
- Cortaderia egmontiana - Phragmites australis
- Cortaderia fulvida - Austroderia fulvida
- Cortaderia quila - Chusquea quila
- Cortaderia richardii - Austroderia richardii
- Cortaderia splendens - Austroderia splendens
- Cortaderia toetoe - Austroderia toetoe
- Cortaderia turbaria - Austroderia turbaria
