= Taquarana =

Municipality in Alagoas, Brazil

- Municipality of Alagoas, Brazil
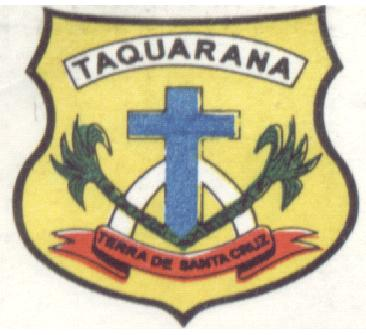
- Coat of arms
- Etymology: Named after the plant of the genus Gynerium
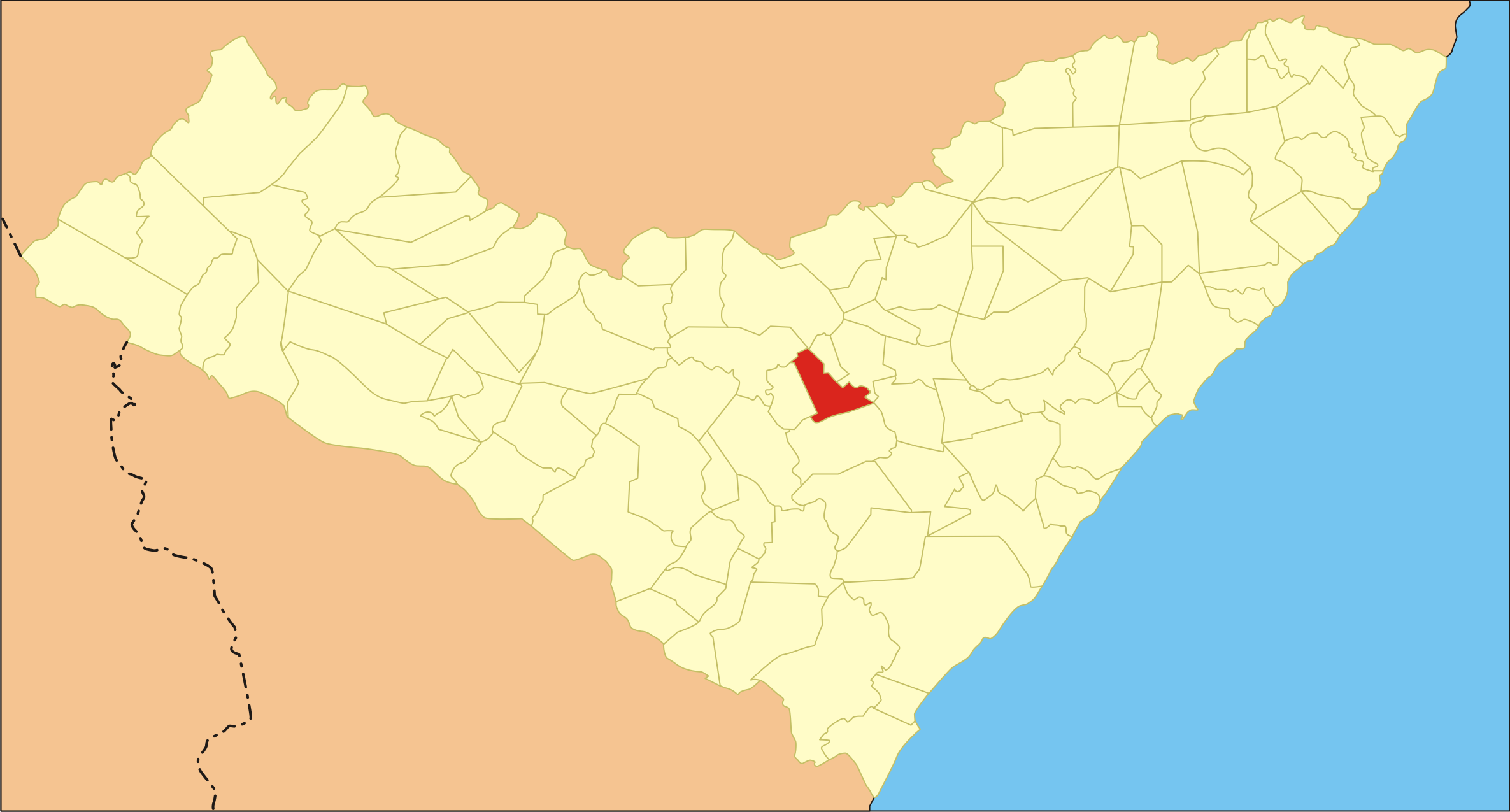
- Location of Taquarana in Alagoas

- Location within Brazil Location within South America
- Coordinates: 9°38′42″S 36°29′49″W
- Country: Brazil
- Region: Northeast
- State: Alagoas
- Founded: 24 August 1962

Government
  - Mayor: Geraldo Cicero da Silva (MDB) (2025-2028)
  - Vice Mayor: Jose Gilberto da Silva (MDB) (2025-2028)

Area
  - Total: 153.841 km^{2} (59.398 sq mi)
- Elevation: 267 m (876 ft)

Population (2022)
  - Total: 19,032
  - Density: 123.71/km^{2} (320.4/sq mi)
- Demonym: Taquaranense (Brazilian Portuguese)
- Time zone: UTC-03:00 (Brasília Time)
- Postal code: 57640-000, 57658-000
- HDI (2010): 0.541 – low
- Website: taquarana.al.gov.br

Taquarana (Central northeastern portuguese pronunciation: [takwɐˈɾɐ̃nɐ]) is a municipality located in the center of the Brazilian state of Alagoas. Its population was 20,072 (2020) and its area is 166 km^{2}.

== See also ==
- List of municipalities in Alagoas
