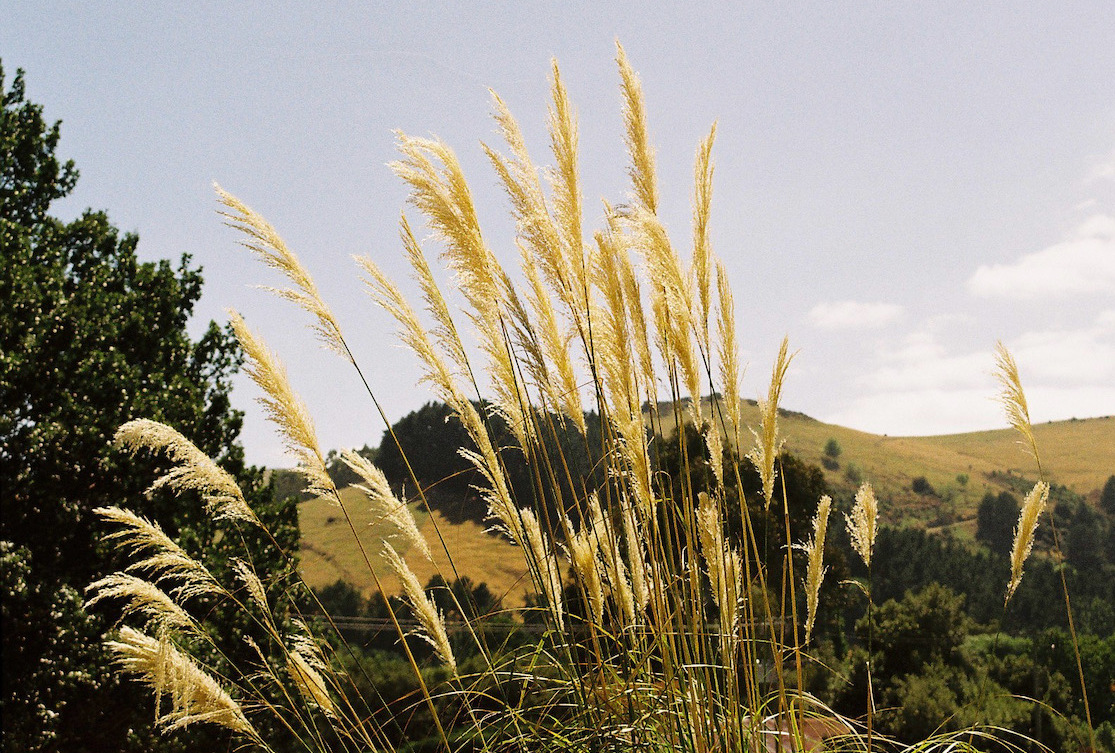
- Austroderia richardii

Scientific classification
- Kingdom: Plantae
- Clade: Embryophytes
- Clade: Tracheophytes
- Clade: Angiosperms
- Clade: Monocots
- Clade: Commelinids
- Order: Poales
- Family: Poaceae
- Subfamily: Danthonioideae
- Tribe: Danthonieae
- Genus: Austroderia; N.P.Barker & H.P.Linder

Type species
- Austroderia richardii (Endl.) N.P.Barker & H.P.Linder

Synonyms
- Kampmannia Steud. 1853, illegitimate homonym not Raf. 1808 (Rutaceae)

= Austroderia =

Toetoe

Genus of grasses

Austroderia is a genus of five species of tall grasses native to New Zealand, commonly known as toetoe (from Māori). The species are A. toetoe, A. fulvida, A. splendens, A. richardii and A. turbaria. They were recently reclassified in 2011 from the genus Cortaderia.

Two closely related South American species are Cortaderia jubata and C. selloana (pampas grass), which have been introduced to New Zealand and are often mistaken for toetoe. These introduced species tend to take over from the native toetoe and are regarded as invasive weeds.

== Description ==
Austroderia forms tough perennial tussocks that grow to between 0.5–6 m (1 ft 8 in – 19 ft 8 in) in height. They can be differentiated from members of Cortaderia (pampas grass) due to having waxy leaves and having drooping white flowers that turn to yellow in the summer, as opposed to pampas grass, which has non-waxy leaves and erect flowers ranging between white, pink and purple. Other differences include the leaves of toetoe not breaking when tugged firmly, and the presence of conspicuous veins between the midrib and leaf margin.

== Taxonomy ==
The genus was first described in 2010, by Hans Peter Linder and Nigel P. Barker, based on a phylogenetic analysis of Danthonioideae. The five members are all plants endemic to New Zealand, and were formerly placed in the genus Cortaderia. The genus is most closely related to Cortaderia of South America and Chimaerochloa. The group's distinctiveness was first recognised in 1853. Austroderia richardii was named as the type species of the genus.

=== Species ===
The following five species comprise the genus:

- Austroderia fulvida (North + South Islands)
- Austroderia richardii (North + South Islands; naturalised in Tasmania)
- Austroderia splendens (coastal parts of North Island)
- Austroderia toetoe (North Island)
- Austroderia turbaria (Chatham Islands)

== Etymology ==
The genus name was created by combining the word Cortaderia with Australis (meaning 'southern'). Māori names for toetoe in its varieties include: toetoe-kākaho, toetoe-mokoro, toetoe-rākau. The flower stem is named kākaho. The name toetoe is a word that literally means to shred or divide, and is used in other Polynesian languages to describe splitting Pandanus into strips. Kākaho shared cognates in other Polynesian languages, with the word usually referring to the stalks of Miscanthus floridulus.

Toetoe is also known as 'cutty grass', especially among children, because the serrated leaf edges can cut the skin. Cutty grass is also used in New Zealand to refer to Gahnia setifola (mapere), Cyperus ustulatus (upoko tangata) and Carex geminata.

== Ecology ==
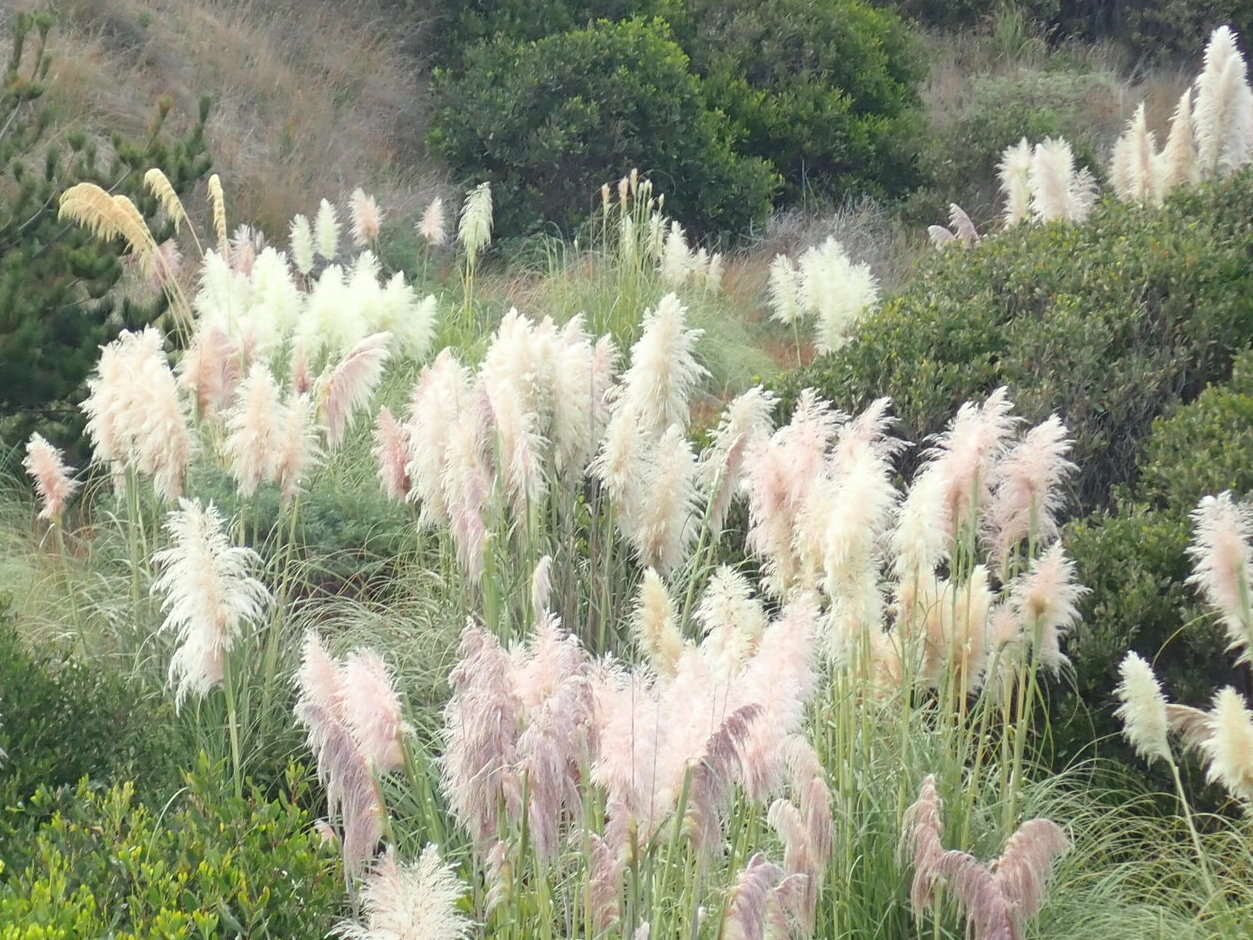
A single Austroderia plant (top left) surrounded by Cortaderia selloana (pampas grass) at Tangimoana Beach

Austroderia is threatened in New Zealand due to the presence of introduced South American species of Cortaderia (pampas grass), which was introduced as a cattle fodder in the 19th century to New Zealand.

== Māori culture ==
In Māori pūrākau, toetoe is the child of the gods Tāne Mahuta and Ngaore. It is associated with vanity, as the plumes are often understood as the plant tossing its hair into the wind, and one story describes the plant pīngao leaving the ocean to being entranced by the beautiful plumes. Other pūrākau associate toetoe with shame.

Toetoe is associated with tohunga rituals, students of tohunga, and mourning ceremonies. The Māori used the toetoe leaves to make baskets, kites, mats, wall linings and roof thatching. It was also used to make containers to cook food in hot springs, due to the fibres being water-resistant. The flower stalks were also useful - as frames for kites, and in tukutuku panelling. It also has uses in traditional rongoā medicinal practices, with the seed heads used on fresh wounds to stop bleeding. Other medicinal uses included treatment of diarrhoea, kidney complaints, and burns.

== Range and habitat ==
Austroderia is endemic to New Zealand, with Austroderia fulvida found in the North Island, Austroderia splendens in the upper North Island, Austroderia toetoe in the lower North Island, and Austroderia richardii in the South Island. Austroderia tubaria is endemic to the Chatham Islands. Members of this genus typically grow at beaches, along coastal cliffs or beside streams.

== Gallery ==
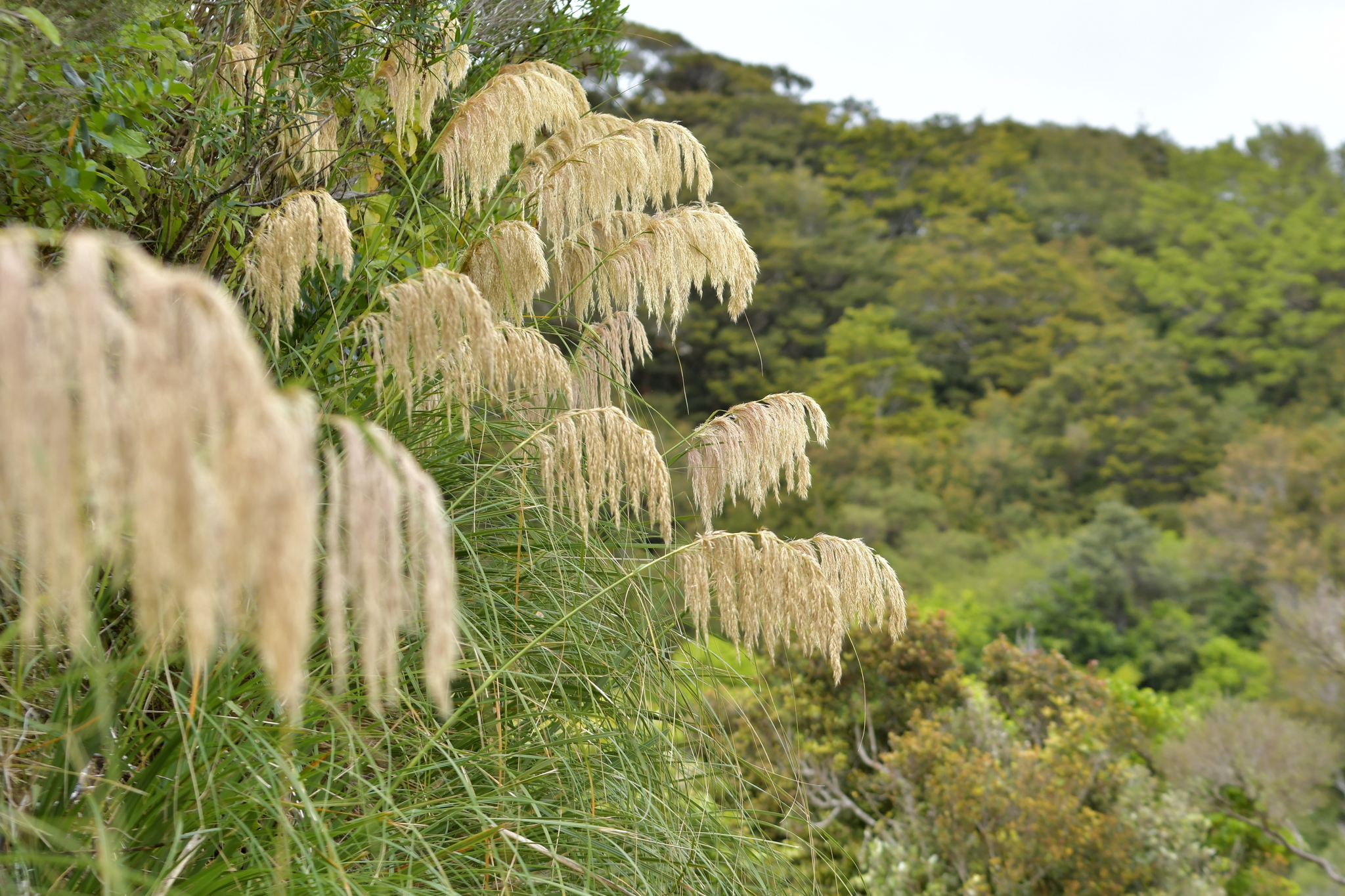
Austroderia fulvida

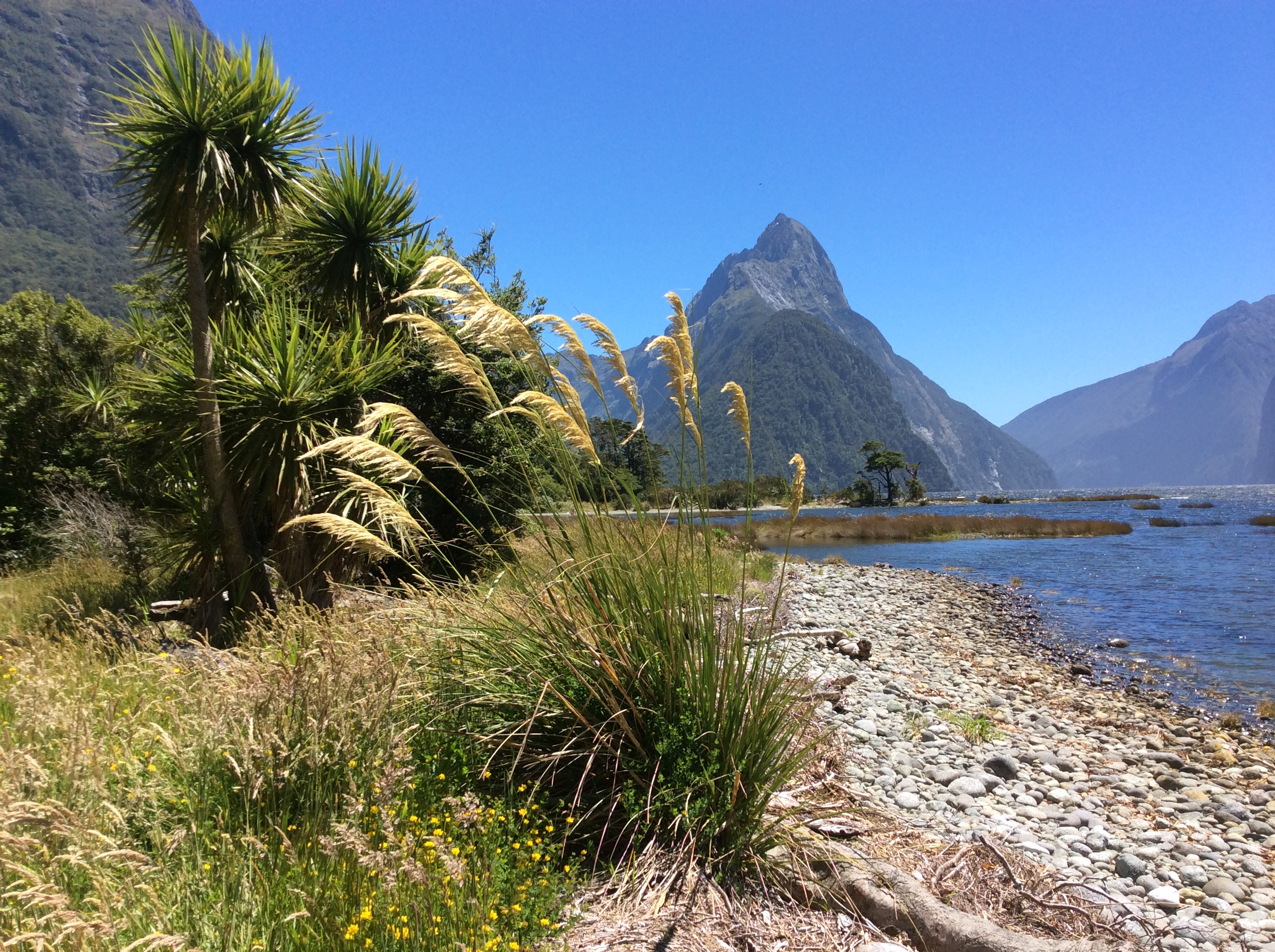
Austroderia richardii

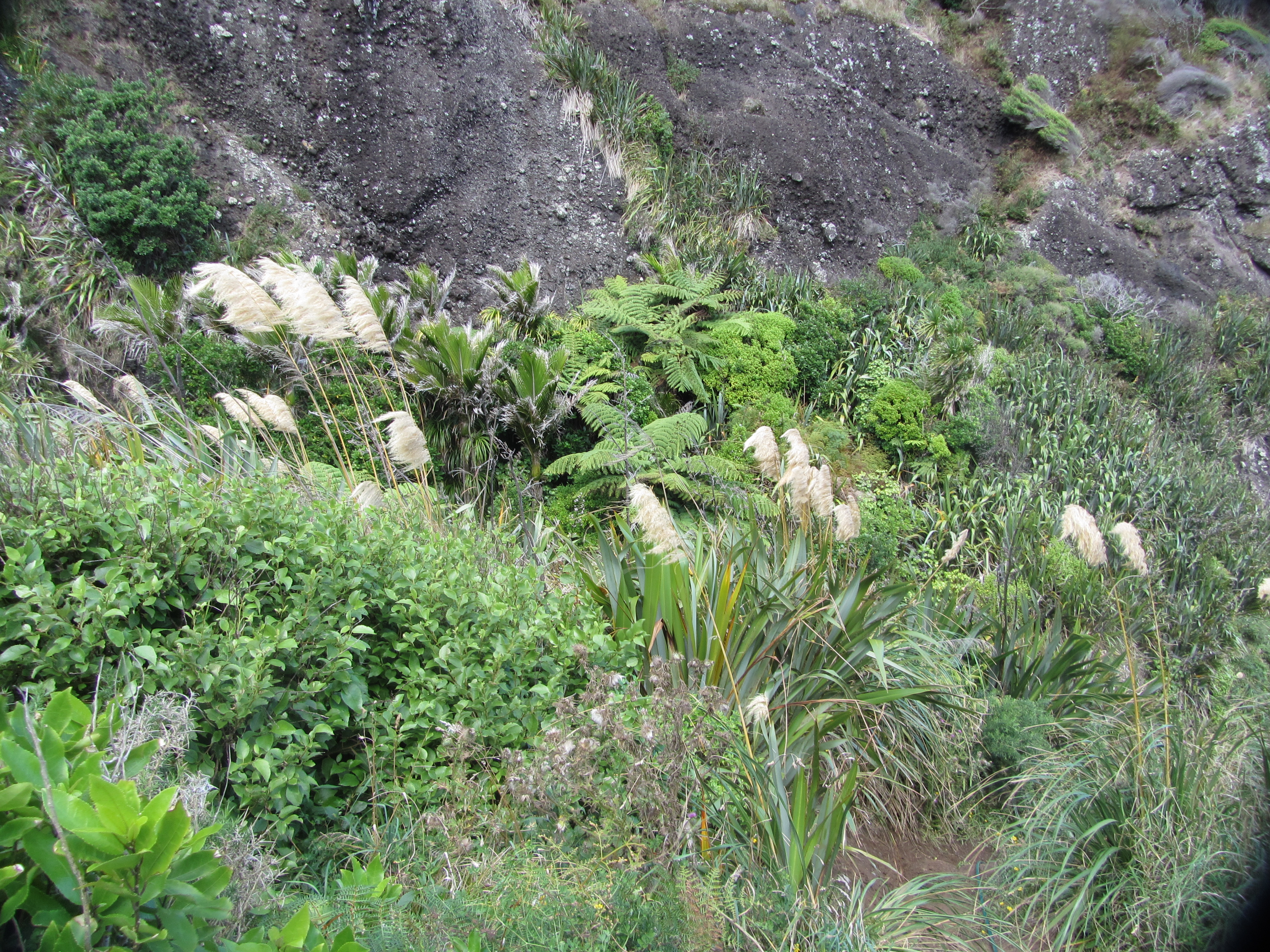
Austroderia splendens

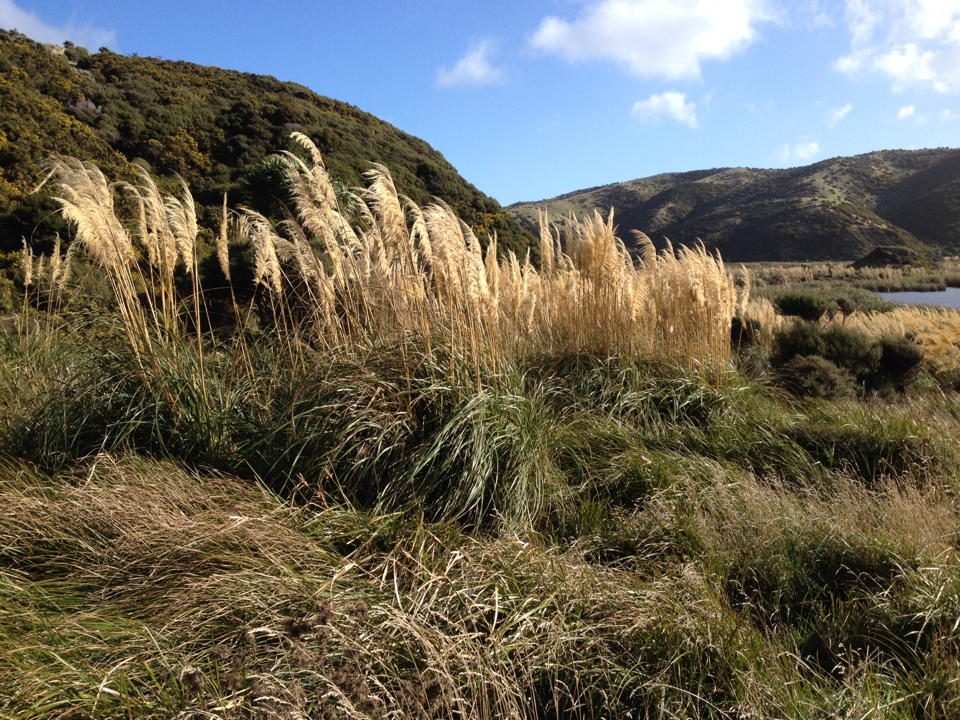
Austroderia toetoe

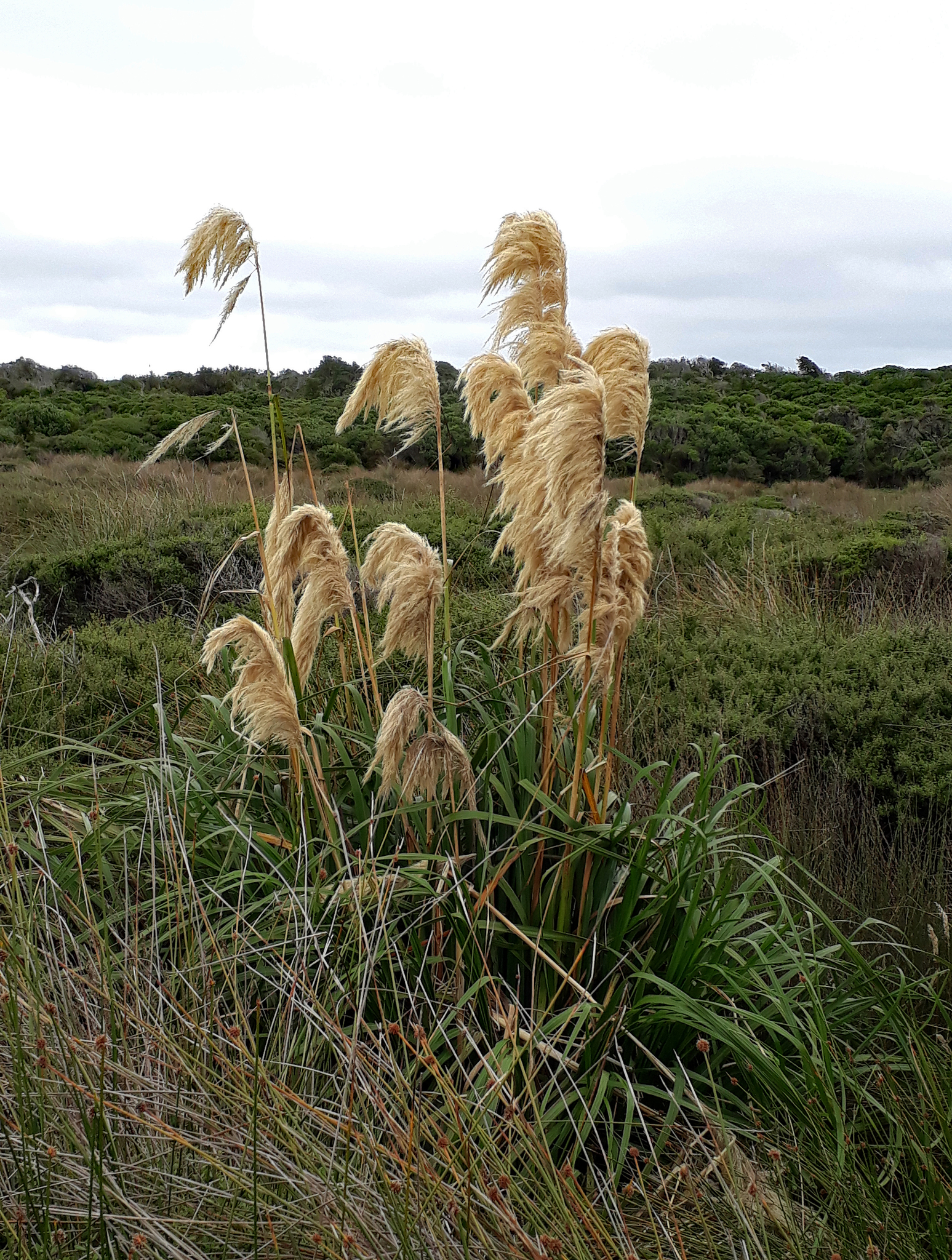
Austroderia turbaria
