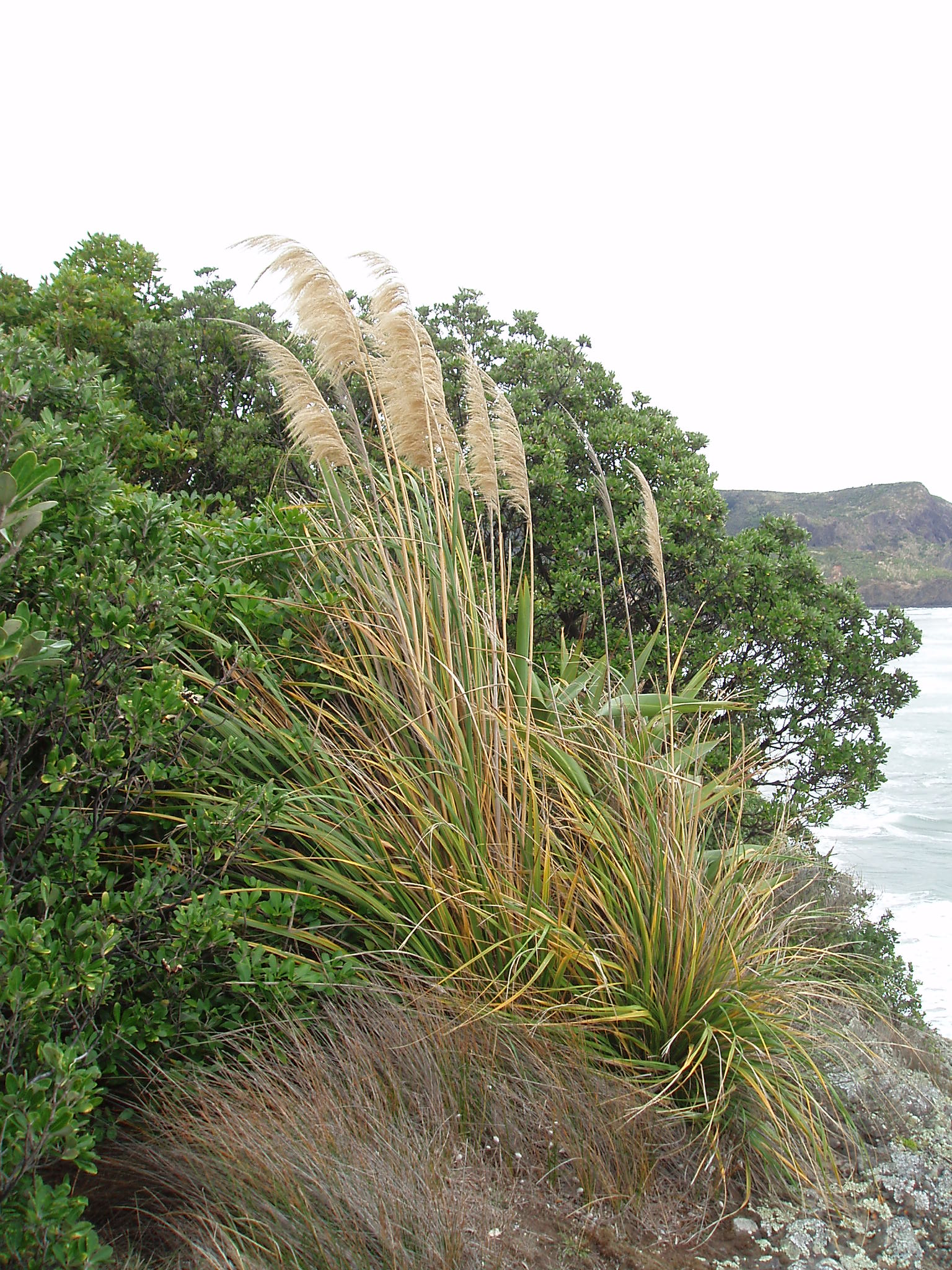

Conservation status
- Declining (NZ TCS)

Scientific classification
- Kingdom: Plantae
- Clade: Tracheophytes
- Clade: Angiosperms
- Clade: Monocots
- Clade: Commelinids
- Order: Poales
- Family: Poaceae
- Genus: Austroderia
- Species: A. splendens

Binomial name
- Austroderia splendens (Connor) N.P.Barker & H.P.Linder

Synonyms
- Cortaderia splendens Connor

= Austroderia splendens =

Species of grass

Austroderia splendens, the toetoe, is a species of grass in the family Poaceae, native to New Zealand.

== Description ==
Austroderia splendens is a grass with tall tussocks of up to 6 m (20 ft) tall. It can be distinguished from other Austroderia due to having wider, more flexible leaves,and by its leaf blade, which above the ligule is densely hairy.

== Taxonomy ==
The species was first described in 1971 by Henry Connor using the name Cortaderia splendens. Connor identified the taxon as being distinct after discovering that some members of toetoe found near Raglan, originally thought to be Cortaderia toetoe, lacked triterpene methyl ethers.

== Range and habitat ==
The species is endemic to New Zealand, found on the North Island as far south as Waikawau and the Ohiwa Harbour, and on off-shore islands including Manawatāwhi / Three Kings Islands. The species is primarily found in coastal areas.

== Gallery ==
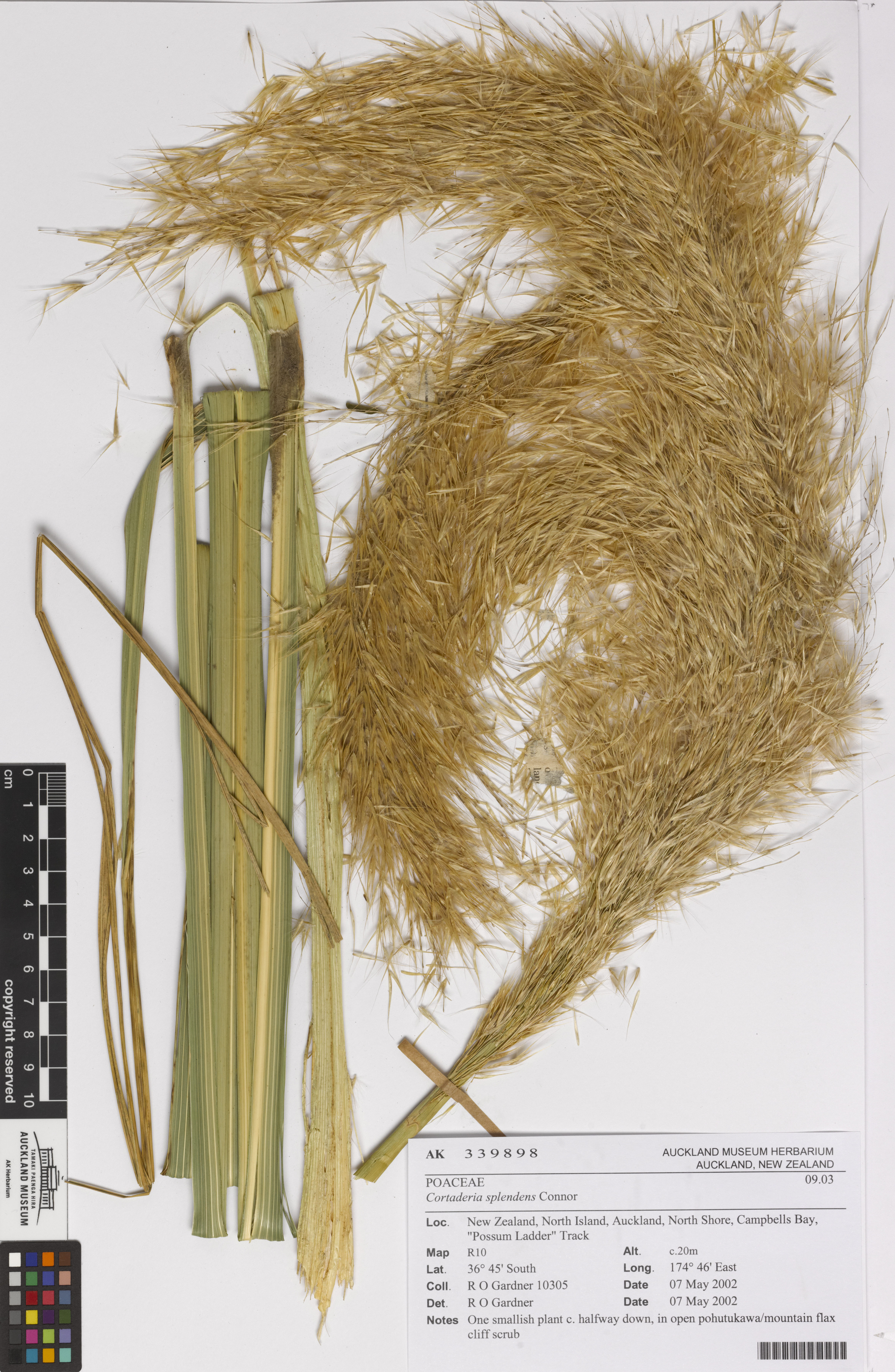
Herbarium specimen

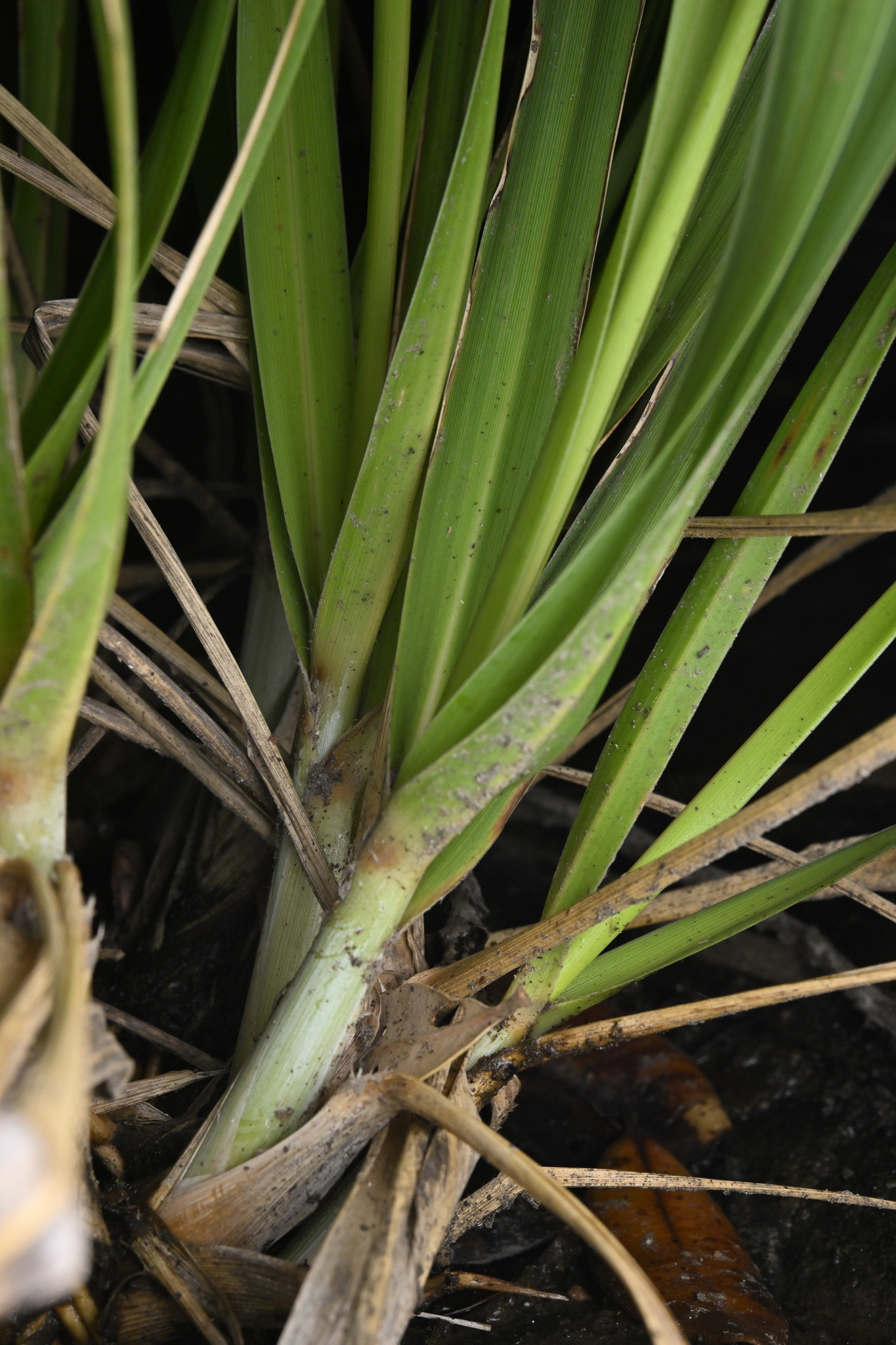
Stem

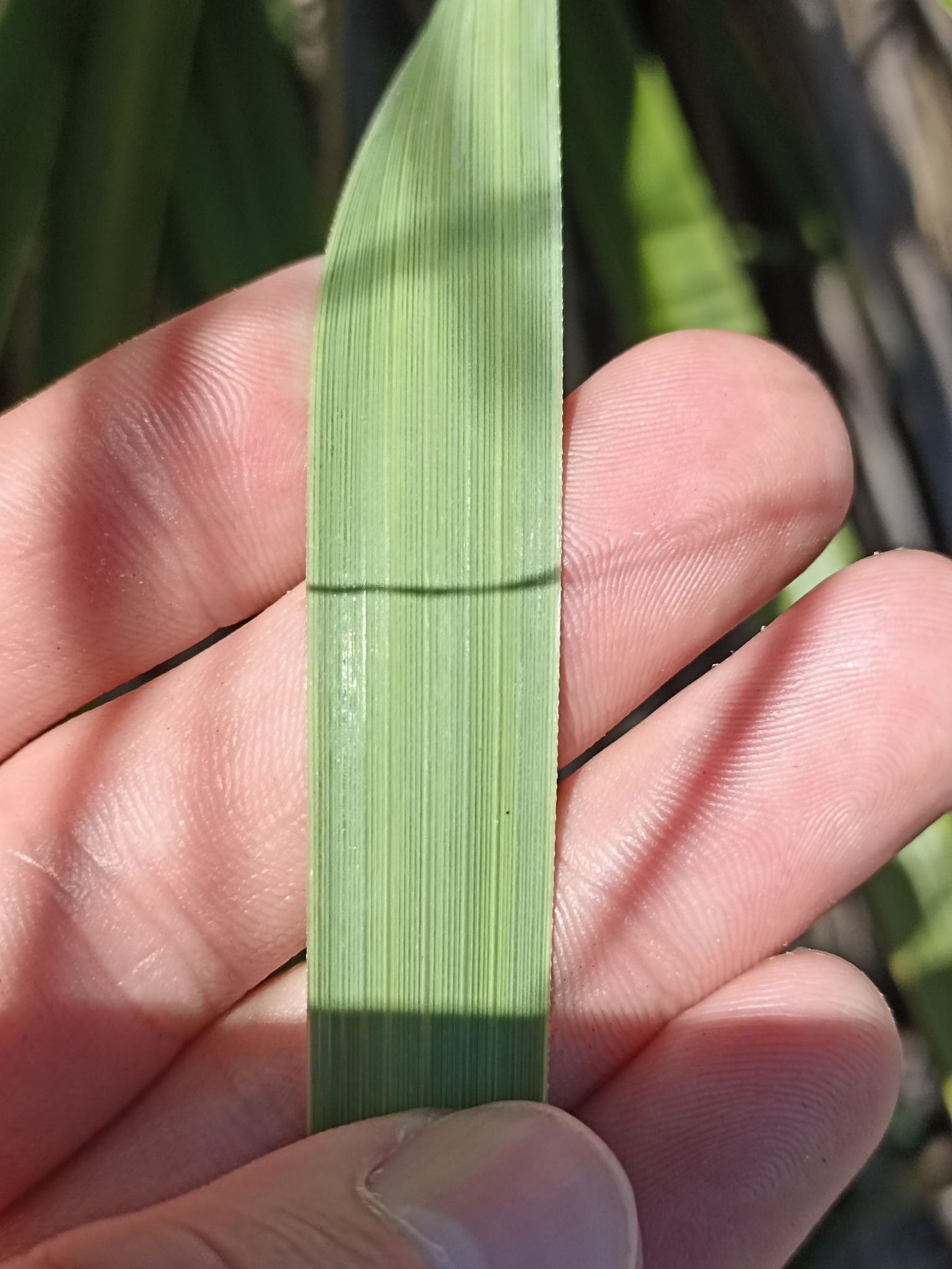
Leaves

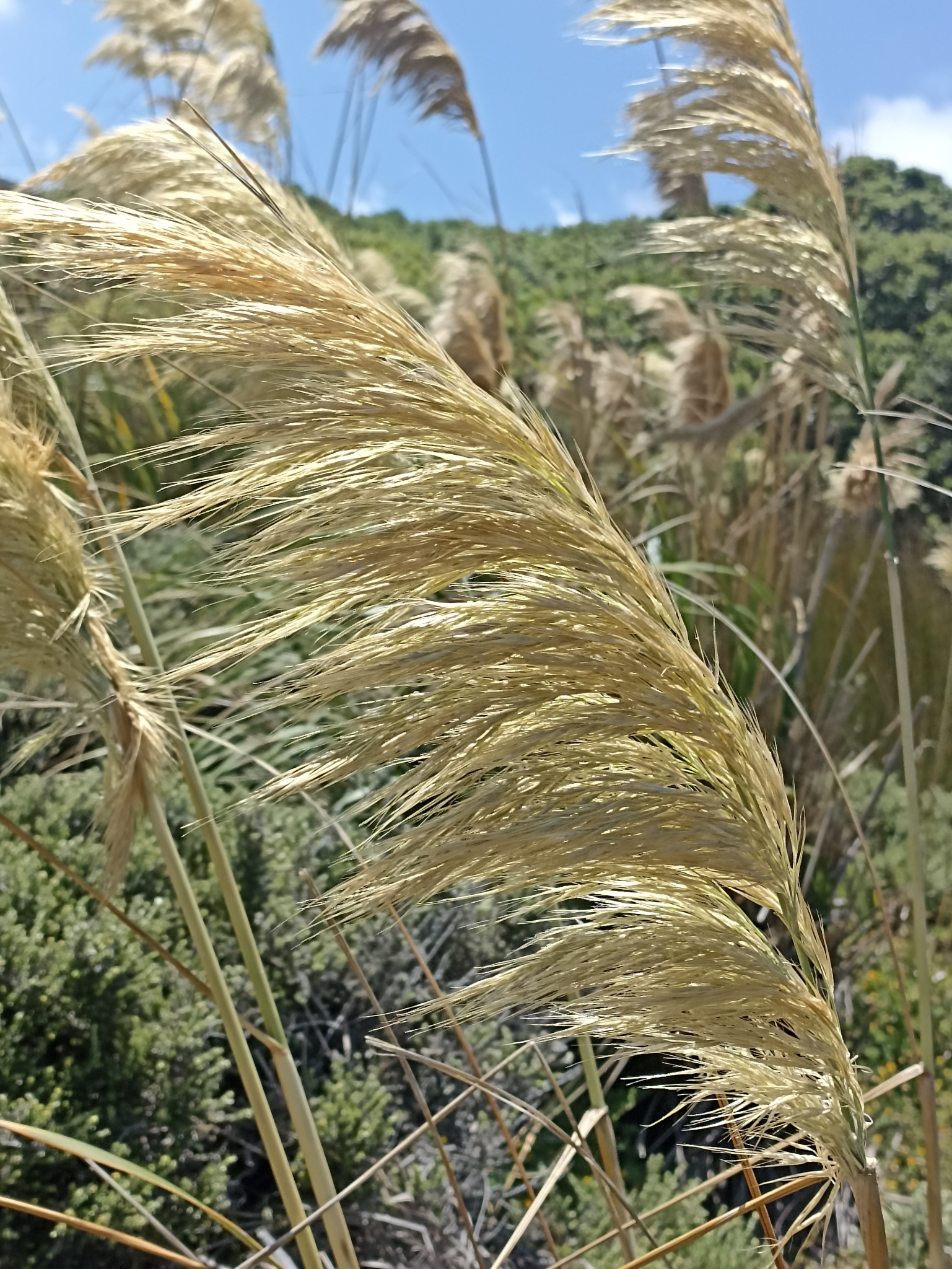
Flower

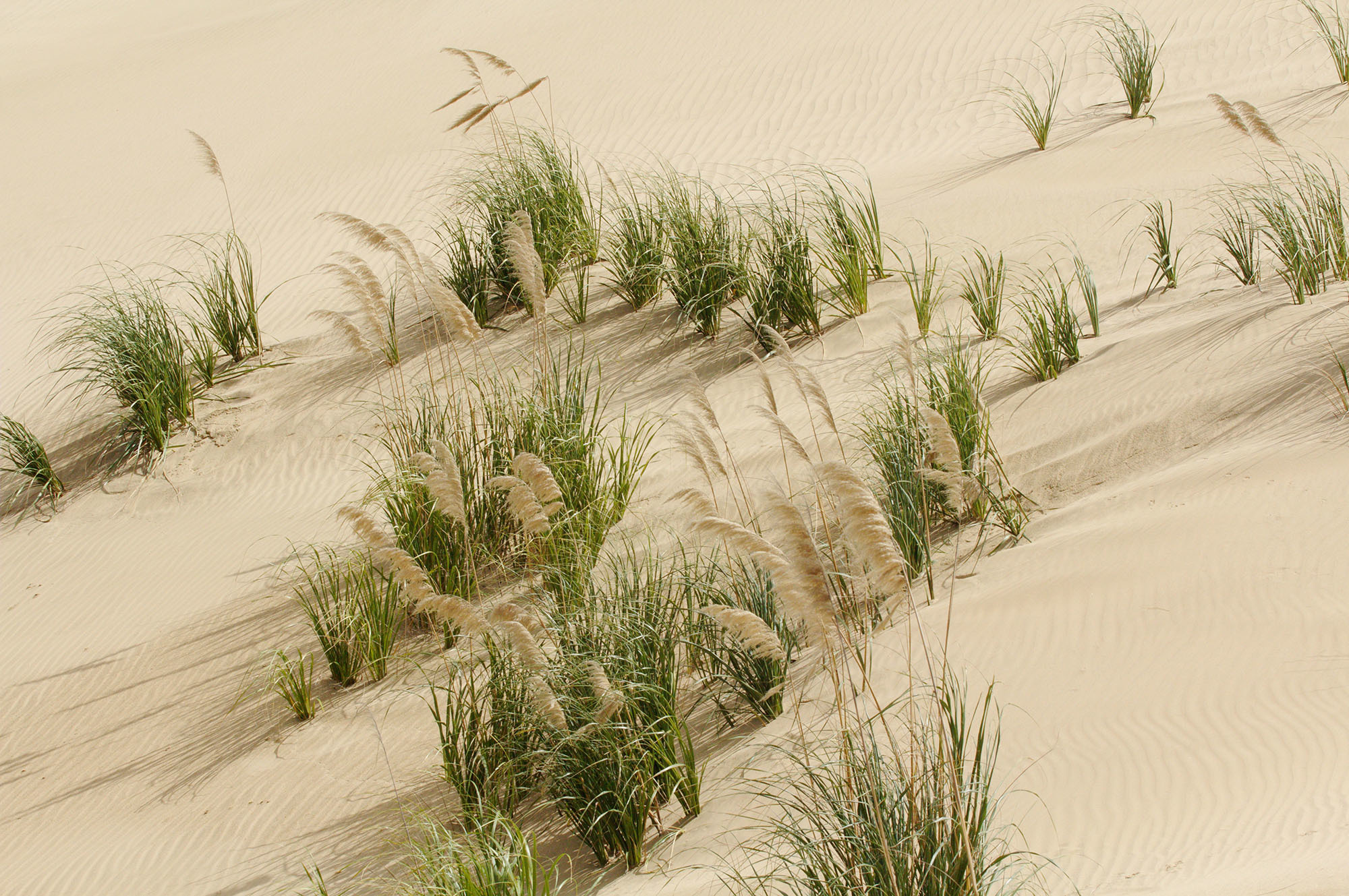
Austroderia splendens in sand dunes
