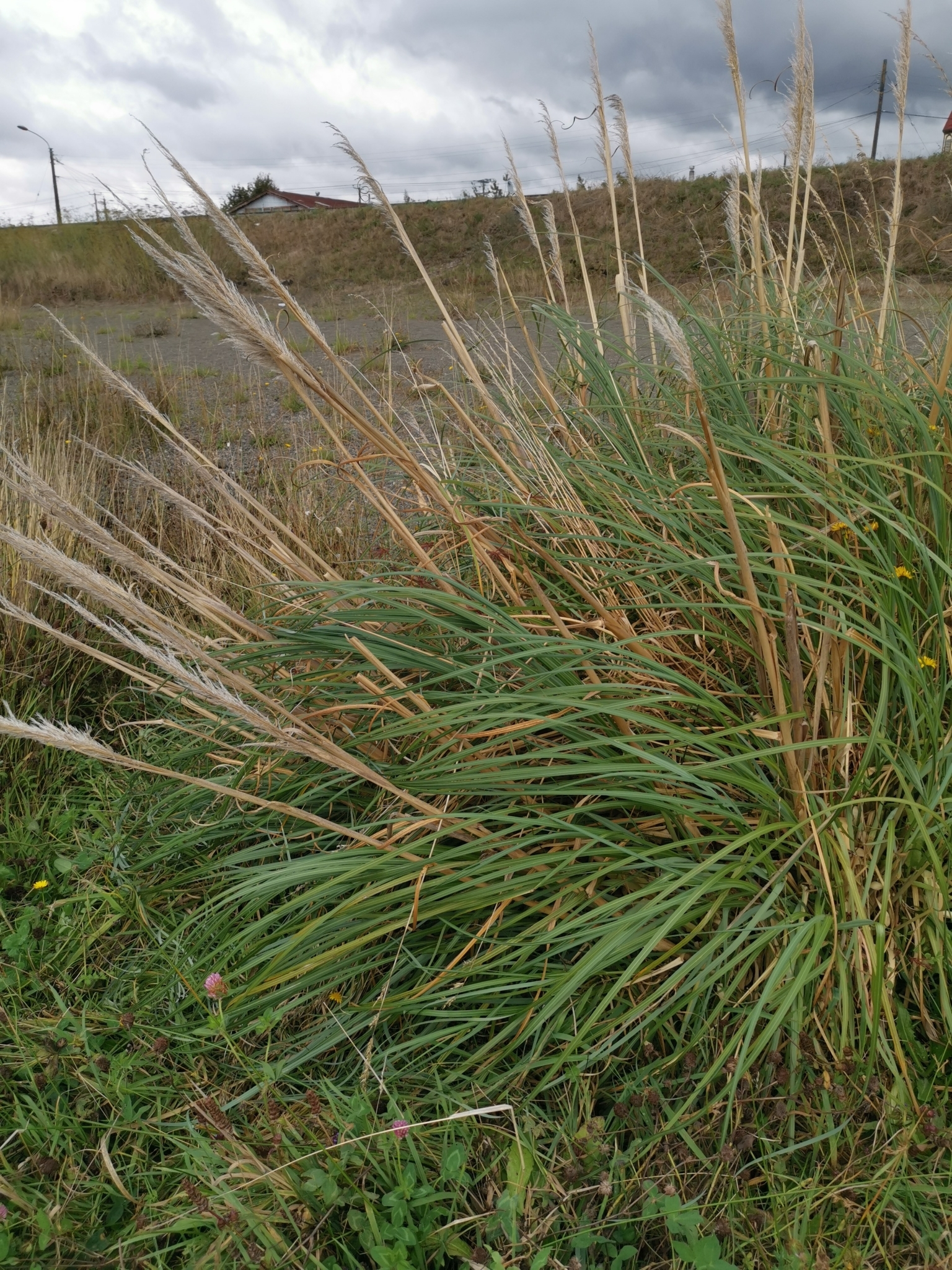

Scientific classification
- Kingdom: Plantae
- Clade: Tracheophytes
- Clade: Angiosperms
- Clade: Monocots
- Clade: Commelinids
- Order: Poales
- Family: Poaceae
- Genus: Cortaderia
- Species: C. araucana

Binomial name
- Cortaderia araucana Stapf

= Cortaderia araucana =

Species of plant

Cortaderia araucana is a species of flowering plant in the family Poaceae. It is a perennial grass native to central and southern Chile, and southern Argentina.
