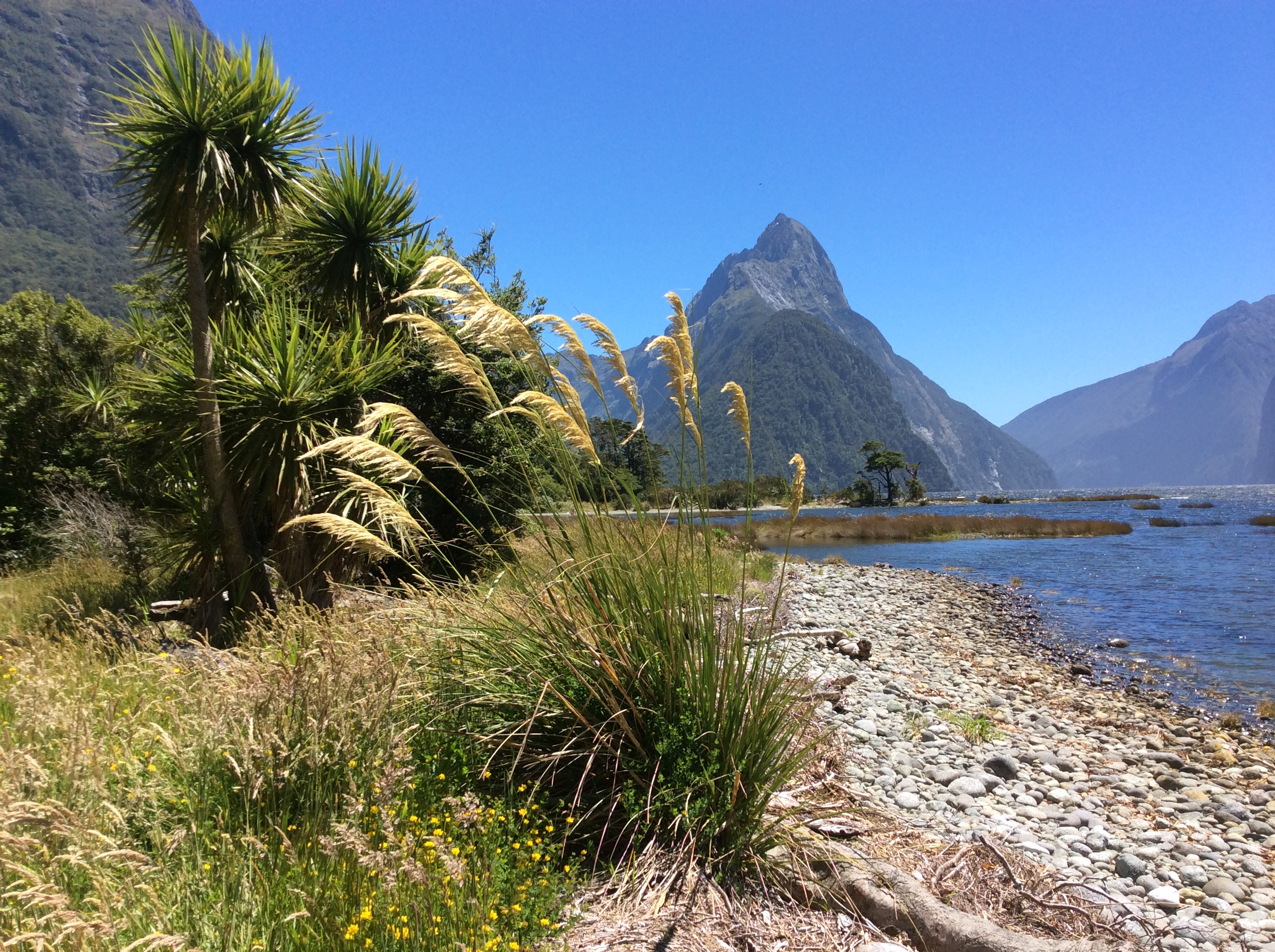

Scientific classification
- Kingdom: Plantae
- Clade: Tracheophytes
- Clade: Angiosperms
- Clade: Monocots
- Clade: Commelinids
- Order: Poales
- Family: Poaceae
- Genus: Austroderia
- Species: A. richardii

Binomial name
- Austroderia richardii (Endl.) N.P.Barker et H.P.Linder

= Austroderia richardii =

Species of grass

Austroderia richardii, syn. Cortaderia richardii, is a species of flowering plant in the family Poaceae. It is an evergreen perennial grass. The genus Austroderia is often confused with "pampas grass", which usually refers to Cortaderia selloana. "Early pampas-grass" is a more specific name. The name "tussock grass" may also be found. The Māori name is "toetoe". It is one of five species commonly called toetoe in the genus Austroderia that are endemic to New Zealand. It occurs in the South Island and possibly also in the North Island. It is also an introduced species in Tasmania, Australia.

== Description ==
A. richardii are large sized grasses that can grow to around 1.5 to 3 m tall. Its leaves are sharp-edged from 1 m long and around 2 to 5 cm wide. Because of its fine, sharp teeth along the edges of the leaves, it is often referred to as "cutty grass". Its leaves are coarse, green, flat and narrow with upright flowering culms 2.5 m tall (Kimberley, 2011). Culms are the hollow stem of the flowering grass plant. These high culms are the main identifying feature of the A. richardii as they have great arching, dense, silvery plumes at the top of the culms which makes them very elegant and stand out from other Austroderia (Kimberley, 2011). The flower head is usually one-sided and drooping. The flower head has many fine hanging branches which contain numerous small clusters of flowers encased in soft, hairy scales. The plumes appear to be a creamy buff to yellowish colour and grow to around 30–60 cm in length and have a loose/open appearance. This is what gives the A. richardii its distinctive thick, soft, plume-like look from its flowering heads. The leaves of the plant have multiple prominent veins running down either side of the middle of the leaf. This makes them a lot tougher and stronger compared to the introduced pampas grass which looks very similar but this is one way of identifying the difference.

A. richardii usually flower around spring and early summer (September to November) though they always retain their plumes. It implements a stage of fruiting around the October and March months. All Austroderia species in New Zealand, including introduced ones, have been proven to be gynodioecious. Being gynodioecious means they are involved in a dimorphic breeding system in which male-sterile individuals coexist with hermaphroditic individuals in populations. Hermaphrodites may be self-compatible also (Connor H. E, 1973). Hermaphrodite Austroderia can be characterized by their large pollen-filled anthers and small gynoecia (the female part of the flower). While female plants have flat, white or transparent, sterile anthers with larger gynoecia (Connor H. E, 1973). Both of these types of sex form seeds. Their seeds are wind dispersed.

== Distribution and habitat ==
A. richardii is endemic to New Zealand but is an introduced species in Tasmania, Australia (Sharp, 2002). In New Zealand, it is confined to only the South Island but could possibly grow in the North Island, East of Cape Palliser (Edgar, 2000).

A. richardii is a very hardy and tolerant grass species that is able to adapt to a wide variety of habitats including, streamside, wetlands, scrubland and coastal sand dunes. It is most suited to moist or dry soils as well as sand, so is able to grow effectively in the habitats mentioned. It can tolerate very poor soils such as sand on coastal dunes and is able to thrive in frost-prone regions. It is well suited to a coastal environment as it can withstand poor soil environments that the dunes appear to have as well as the coastal wind and precipitation effects that occur in coastal regions, for example, on the west coast of the South Island or east coast.

A. richardii is suited to many different types of environmental conditions but prefers areas around water (Kimberley, 2011). This shows that the plant prefers to have a lot of moisture uptake. Although it is best suited to moist soil it can tolerate soils which are poor in nutrients such as those soils with the main component being sand, clay or pumice. These soils will lack nutrients due to having too little or too much moisture in them.

== Ecology ==
A. richardii is predominately predated on by herbivores, which includes a wide range of New Zealand endemic bird species and exotic bird species. They mainly feed on the seed from the plumes that flower in spring to summer. It is not poisonous but it can be assumed that most herbivores would not attempt to eat the leaves of the Austroderia richardii as it has very sharp edges and tiny teeth that run along the leaves of the plant which is why it has the nickname 'cutty grass' (Kimberley, 2011). As well as having the ability to cut predators they are also of low palatability to introduced herbivores which means its taste is not very satisfying at all to the animals so they get no enjoyment out of eating it. It has been known that some grazing stock will eat the leaves but it is not enough to be a threat to the species.

== Cultivation ==
A. richardii is widely cultivated in temperate regions for its plumes of silvery white inflorescences that appear in summer and last until well into winter, and grow to 60 cm (24 in). Like its relatives it is much used in dried flower arrangements. It has gained the Royal Horticultural Society's Award of Garden Merit.

A. richardii is the only native New Zealand species in the genus Austroderia that is offered for sale within New Zealand. It is often sold for its ornamental value and is very hard to obtain therefore is only available through nurseries that specialize in native plants. A. richardii generally grows in clumps of around five or six plants. This is likely due to the way the seeds are dispersed, through wind dispersal. It acts as a good wind-break for stock as they grow in clumps and are very hardy plants that can withstand many weather conditions. Botanists will often remove the old stalks that are no longer flowering so that they have a more appealing look and act as an ornamental feature in a garden or in their natural habitats.

To break the dormancy of A. richardii species it is suggested that they undergo stratification of the seed by chilling it. The seed is placed in water overnight to soak, once this has occurred it is drained and then kept moist in a refrigerator for around a 4-week period. After this period the seed will be able to germinate and propagate into seedlings. Toetoe can also be propagated by division. Juvenile plants are easy to divide and grow more effectively in comparison to mature plants.
