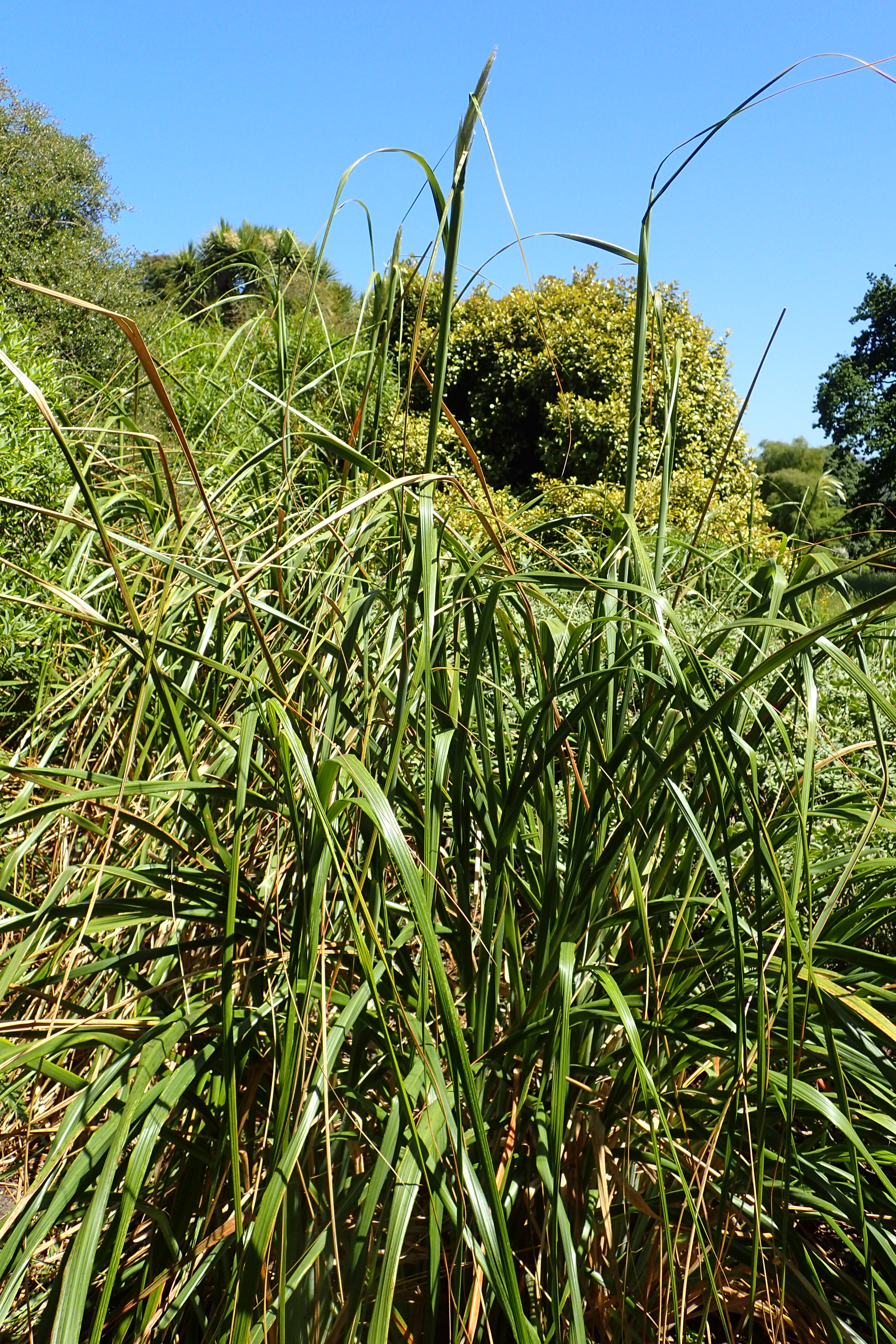

Scientific classification
- Kingdom: Plantae
- Clade: Tracheophytes
- Clade: Angiosperms
- Clade: Monocots
- Clade: Commelinids
- Order: Poales
- Family: Poaceae
- Genus: Austroderia
- Species: A. turbaria

Binomial name
- Austroderia turbaria (Connor) N.P.Barker et H.P.Linder

= Austroderia turbaria =

Species of grass

Austroderia turbaria is a species of flowering plant in the family Poaceae and is endemic to the Chatham Islands of New Zealand. It is commonly called the Chatham Island toetoe and is in the genus Austroderia.

== Description ==
Austroderia turbaria are tall hermaphrodite grasses. Its leaves are light-green in colour. Culms are up to 2 m (6 ft 7 in) tall. The inflorescence portion is usually between 400 and 800 mm and is very plumose.

== Distribution and habitat ==
Austroderia turbaria is endemic to the Chatham Islands of New Zealand where it grows near the margins of slowly flowing streams and lakes.
