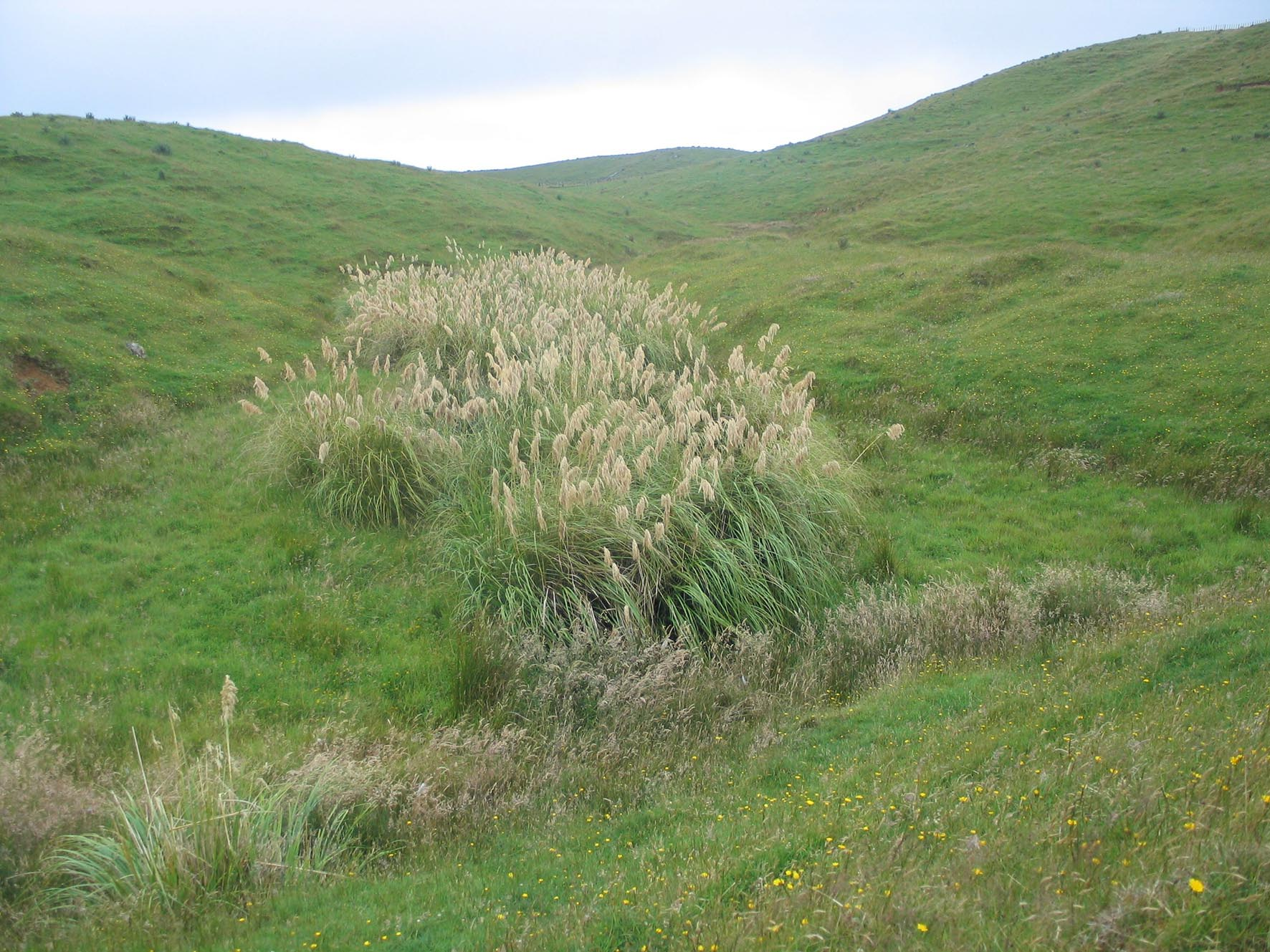
- At the Kawhia Ecological District

Scientific classification
- Kingdom: Plantae
- Clade: Tracheophytes
- Clade: Angiosperms
- Clade: Monocots
- Clade: Commelinids
- Order: Poales
- Family: Poaceae
- Genus: Austroderia
- Species: A. fulvida

Binomial name
- Austroderia fulvida (Buchanan) N.P.Barker & H.P.Linder

Synonyms
- Arundo fulvida Buchanan; Cortaderia fulvida (Buchanan) Zotov

= Austroderia fulvida =

Species of grass

Austroderia fulvida, the toetoe, is a species of grass in the family Poaceae, native to New Zealand. As its synonym Cortaderia fulvida it has gained the Royal Horticultural Society's Award of Garden Merit as an ornamental.
