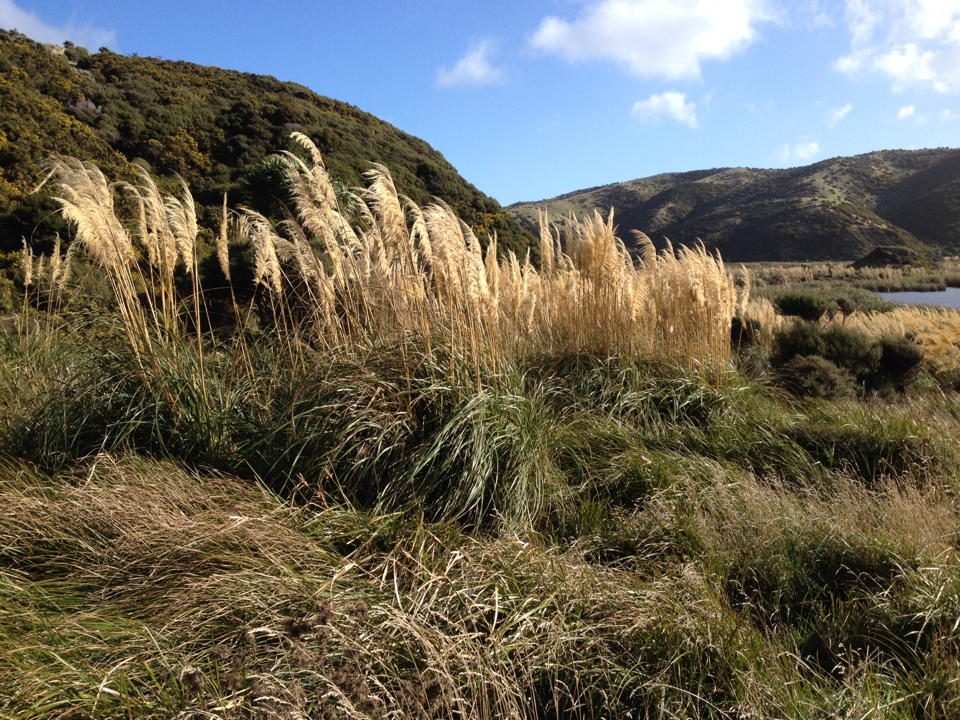

Conservation status
- Not Threatened (NZ TCS)

Scientific classification
- Kingdom: Plantae
- Clade: Tracheophytes
- Clade: Angiosperms
- Clade: Monocots
- Clade: Commelinids
- Order: Poales
- Family: Poaceae
- Genus: Austroderia
- Species: A. toetoe

Binomial name
- Austroderia toetoe (Zotov) N.P.Barker et H.P.Linder

= Austroderia toetoe =

Species of grass

Austroderia toetoe is a species of flowering plant in the family Poaceae and is native to the North Island of New Zealand. It is one of five species commonly called toetoe in the genus Austroderia that are endemic to New Zealand.

== Description ==
Austroderia toetoe are very tall grasses that can grow up to 4 metres tall when flowered. Its leaves are prickly and straw-yellow or light-green in colour. Culms are up to 4 m tall and the inflorescence portion is very plumose. Chromosome counts of 2n = 90 have been recorded.

== Distribution and habitat ==
Austroderia toetoe is endemic to the North Island of New Zealand where it grows from western Waikato south to Wellington. It has also been naturalised to Waiheke Island. It is common in freshwater swamps and wet areas.

== Conservation status ==
This plant has been classified by the New Zealand Department of Conservation as being "Not Threatened" under the New Zealand Threat Classification System.
