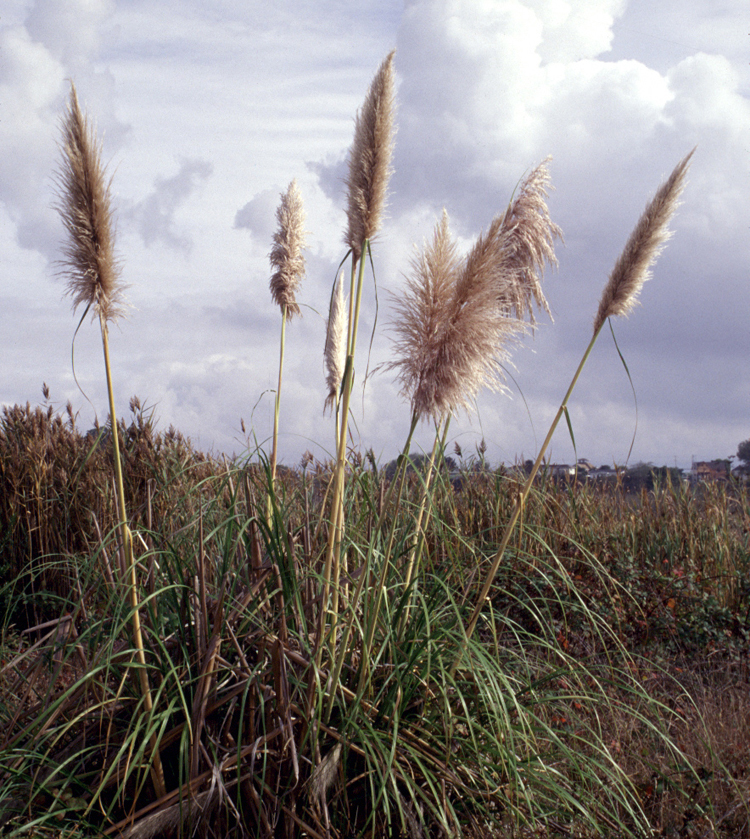

Scientific classification
- Kingdom: Plantae
- Clade: Tracheophytes
- Clade: Angiosperms
- Clade: Monocots
- Clade: Commelinids
- Order: Poales
- Family: Poaceae
- Genus: Cortaderia
- Species: C. jubata

Binomial name
- Cortaderia jubata (Lem.) Stapf

Synonyms
- Cortaderia atacamensis

= Cortaderia jubata =

Species of plant

Cortaderia jubata is a species of grass known by several common names, including purple pampas grass and Andean pampas grass. It is similar to its more widespread relative, the pampas grass C. selloana, but it can get quite a bit taller, approaching seven meters in height at maximum.

This grass is native to the northern Andes but it is well-known elsewhere as an invasive species noxious weed. This grass has only pistillate parts, that is, all individuals are female. It reproduces by apomixis, in which embryos develop without fertilization.

== Description ==
This pampas grass, Cortaderia jubata, has long, thin, razor-edged leaves forming a large bunch grass tussock from which the eye-catching inflorescences arise. At the top of a stem several meters in height is an inflorescence of plumelike spikelets. These panicles are pink or purplish when new and they gradually turn cream or white. Each inflorescence is packed full of fruits which develop despite the plant's having never been fertilized. Each plant produces millions of seeds per year. They disperse easily by several methods, including wind, water, and soil transport.

== Invasive species ==
=== New Zealand ===
In New Zealand C. jubata is listed on the National Pest Plant Accord prohibiting it from sale, and commercial propagation and distribution.

=== United States ===
Cortaderia jubata grows well in the conditions provided by the cool, moist California coast, where it was presumably an introduced species as an attractive ornamental plant. It is a common weed of Redwood National and State Parks, the Central Coast region, and Big Sur, as well as other coastal hillsides and roadsides throughout the state. The plant competes with native vegetation, interferes with the natural scenery of the unique ecosystems and habitats (i.e. redwood and coastal sage scrub), harbors pest species such as rats, and produces large amounts of dry foliage which is a wildfire hazard.

=== European Union ===
The plant features on the list of invasive alien species of Union concern. This means that it cannot be traded anymore.

=== Invasion biology ===
C. jubata is morphologically similar to the related invasive plant, C. selloana. The invasion success of both is most strongly limited by mammalian herbivory.
