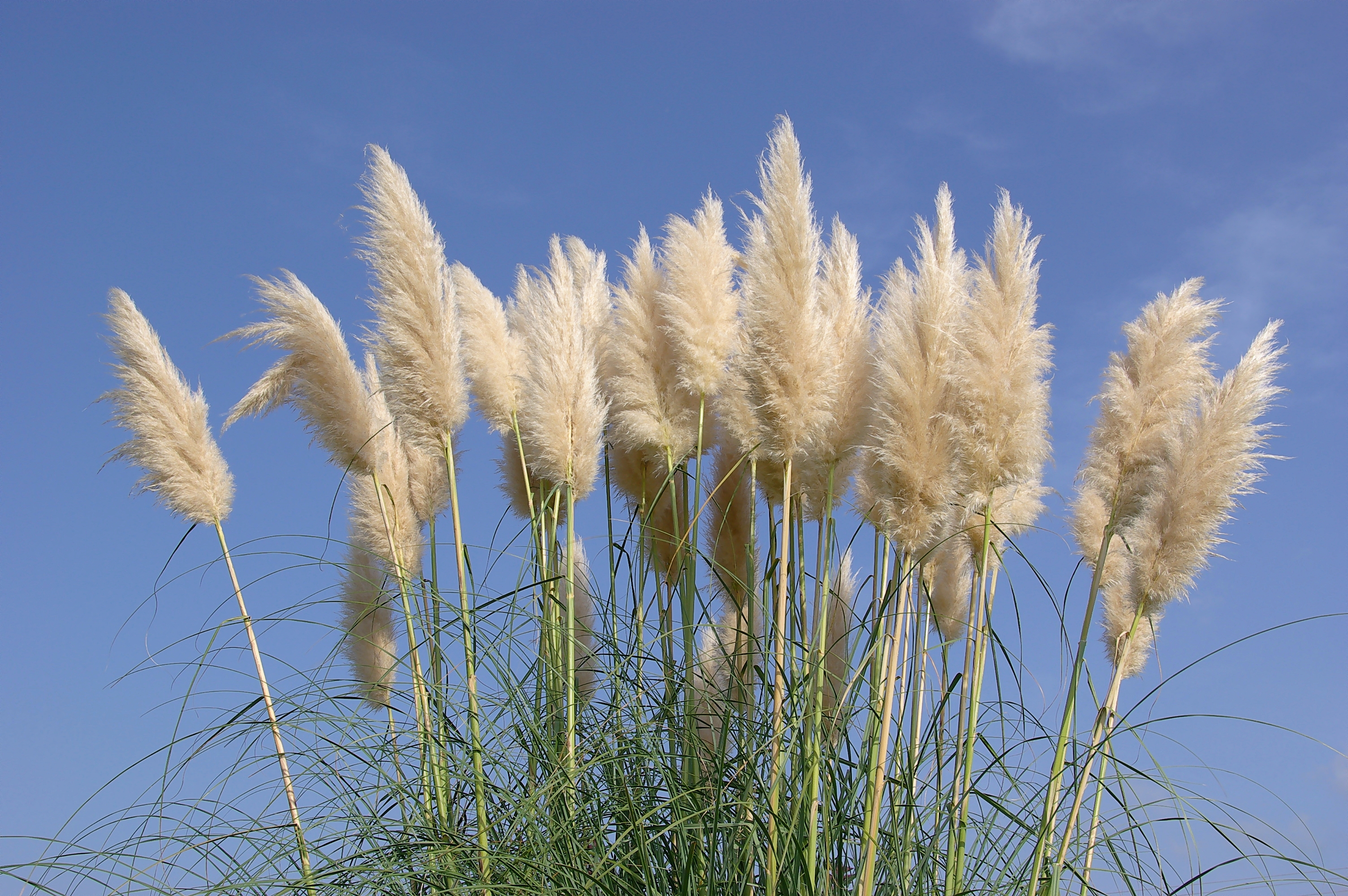
- Inflorescences

Scientific classification
- Kingdom: Plantae
- Clade: Tracheophytes
- Clade: Angiosperms
- Clade: Monocots
- Clade: Commelinids
- Order: Poales
- Family: Poaceae
- Genus: Cortaderia
- Species: C. selloana

Binomial name
- Cortaderia selloana (Schult. & Schult.f.) Asch. & Graebn.

Synonyms
- Arundo kila Spreng. ex Steud. Arundo selloana Schult. & Schult.f. Cortaderia argentea (Nees) Stapf; Gynerium argenteum Nees; Gynerium dioicum Dallière; Gynerium purpureum Carrière; Moorea argentea (Nees) Lem.

= Cortaderia selloana =

Pampas grass

Species of plant in the grass family

Cortaderia selloana is a species of flowering plant in the family Poaceae. It is referred to by the common name pampas grass, and is native to southern South America, including the Pampas region after which it is named. It is widely distributed throughout the world as a cultivated ornamental and invasive species.

== Etymology ==
Cortaderia is derived from the Argentine Spanish name cortadera, meaning 'cutter', in reference to its razor-sharp leaf margins.

Selloana is named for Friedrich Sellow (1789–1831), a German botanist and naturalist from Potsdam who worked as a plant collector in Brazil. He studied the flora of South America, especially that of Brazil. The specific epithet selloana was given by Josef August and Julius Hermann Schultes in 1827.

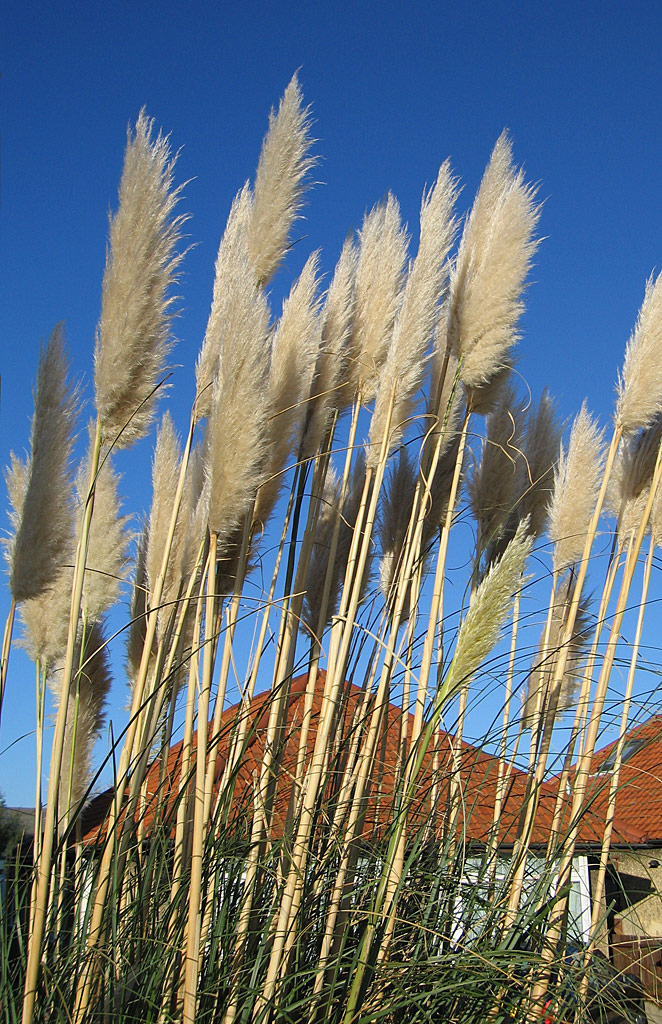
In cultivation

== Ecology ==
The native range of C. selloana includes Argentina, Bolivia, Brazil, Chile, Paraguay, and Uruguay. This region is dominated by subtropical forests and grasslands, but C. selloana is typically restricted to moist soil within riparian areas. It is found at lower elevations and at moister sites than the closely related C. jubata. It requires areas with plentiful light and soil moisture. It is a common invasive species in temperate regions around the world, where it can be found growing in moist, disturbed soil.

=== Control ===
Pampas grass can be controlled through herbicide treatment. To accomplish this, the grass is cut down near the base. Next, a 2% glyphosate chemical solution is combined with a silicone-based surfactant and applied to enhance the penetration potential. This method works best in the fall because there is overall better control compared to other seasons. Another control method is to cut and bag inflorescences to prevent seeds from spreading or pulling seedlings.

== Cultivation ==
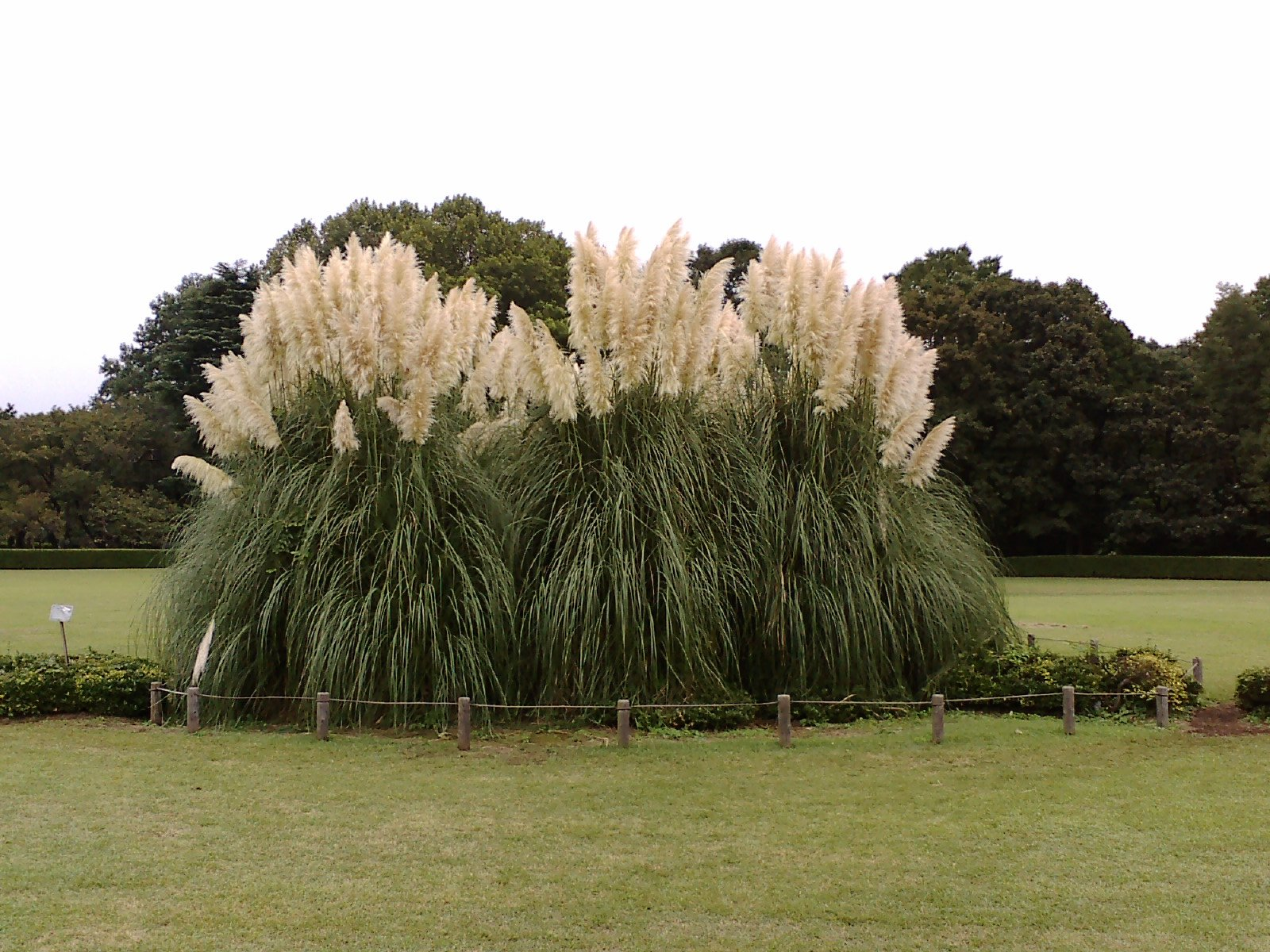
Jindai Botanical Garden, height 4 metres (13.1 ft) and diameter 7 metres (23 ft), germinated in the late 1960s

Several cultivars are available, of which the following have gained the Royal Horticultural Society's Award of Garden Merit:

- Aureolineata
- Evita
- Monstrosa
- Patagonia
- Pumila
- Silver Feather Notcort
- Sunningdale Silver—grows to a height of 4 m (13.1 ft) and has particularly dense flowering plumes

== Population biology ==
Okada et al., 2007 find C. selloana populations are best distinguished by a Bayesian analysis of genetic features such as microsatellites. Algorithms such as STRUCTURE are suitable for this.

== In culture ==
Author Li Hengrui (李恒瑞), whose work Kite Capriccio (風箏暢想曲) describes life as a child in 1950s Fengtai County, Anhui, mentions the use of the long stem of the Puwei (蒲葦, Chinese for Cortaderia selloana) in the construction of kites.

Several media outlets reported in the 2010s that it was planted by some couples who practise swinging in the United Kingdom as a way to indicate to other swingers that they enjoy that lifestyle. The reports caused a plunge in already declining sales, but the odd association has been dismissed by enthusiasts of the plant and gardening experts as "silly".

== Diseases ==
O'Donnell et al., 2004 first isolated Fusarium cortaderiae from this species. F. cortaderiae is the cause of Fusarium head blight (FHB) of C. selloana.

== Gallery ==
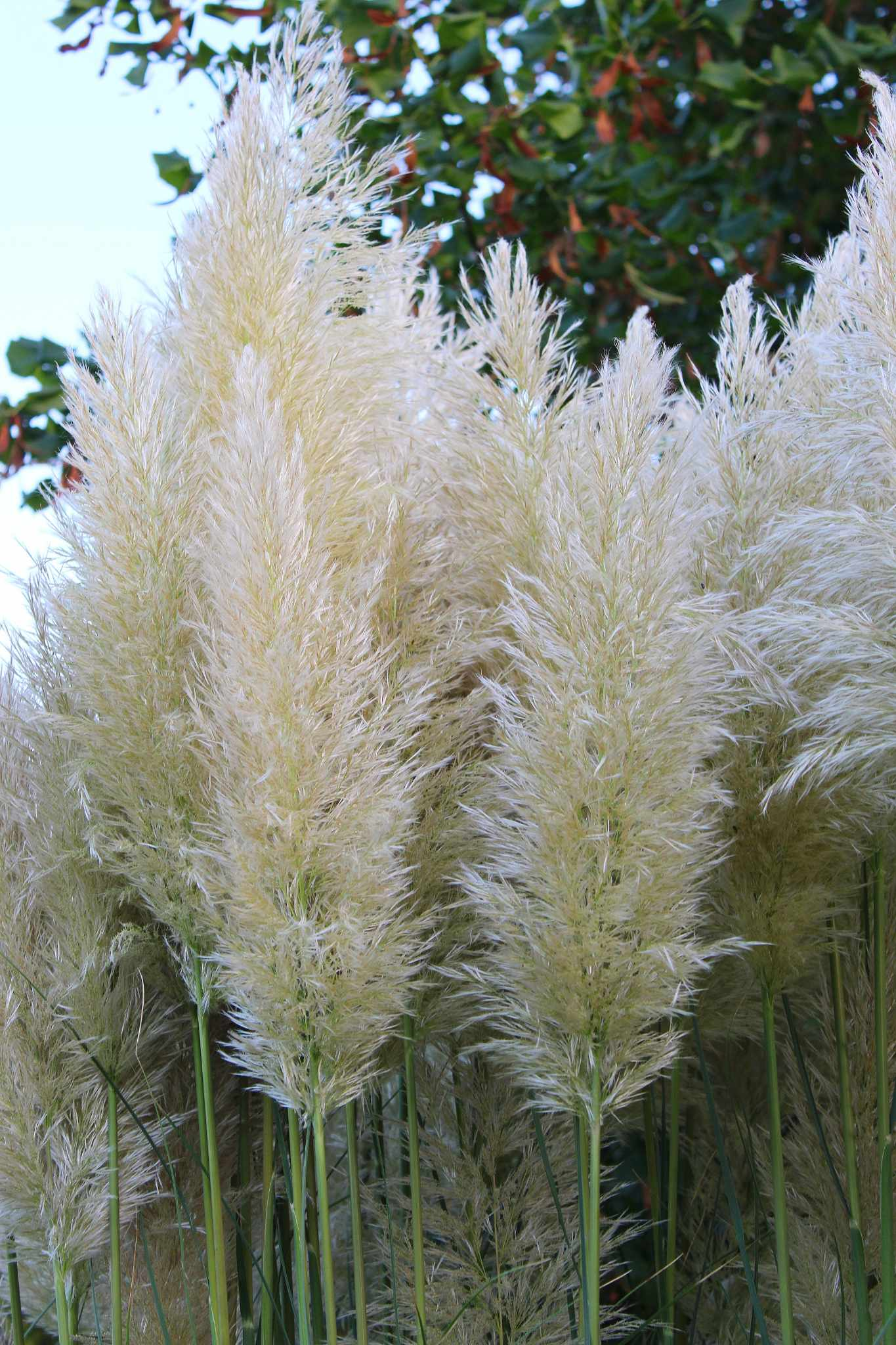
In Serbia.

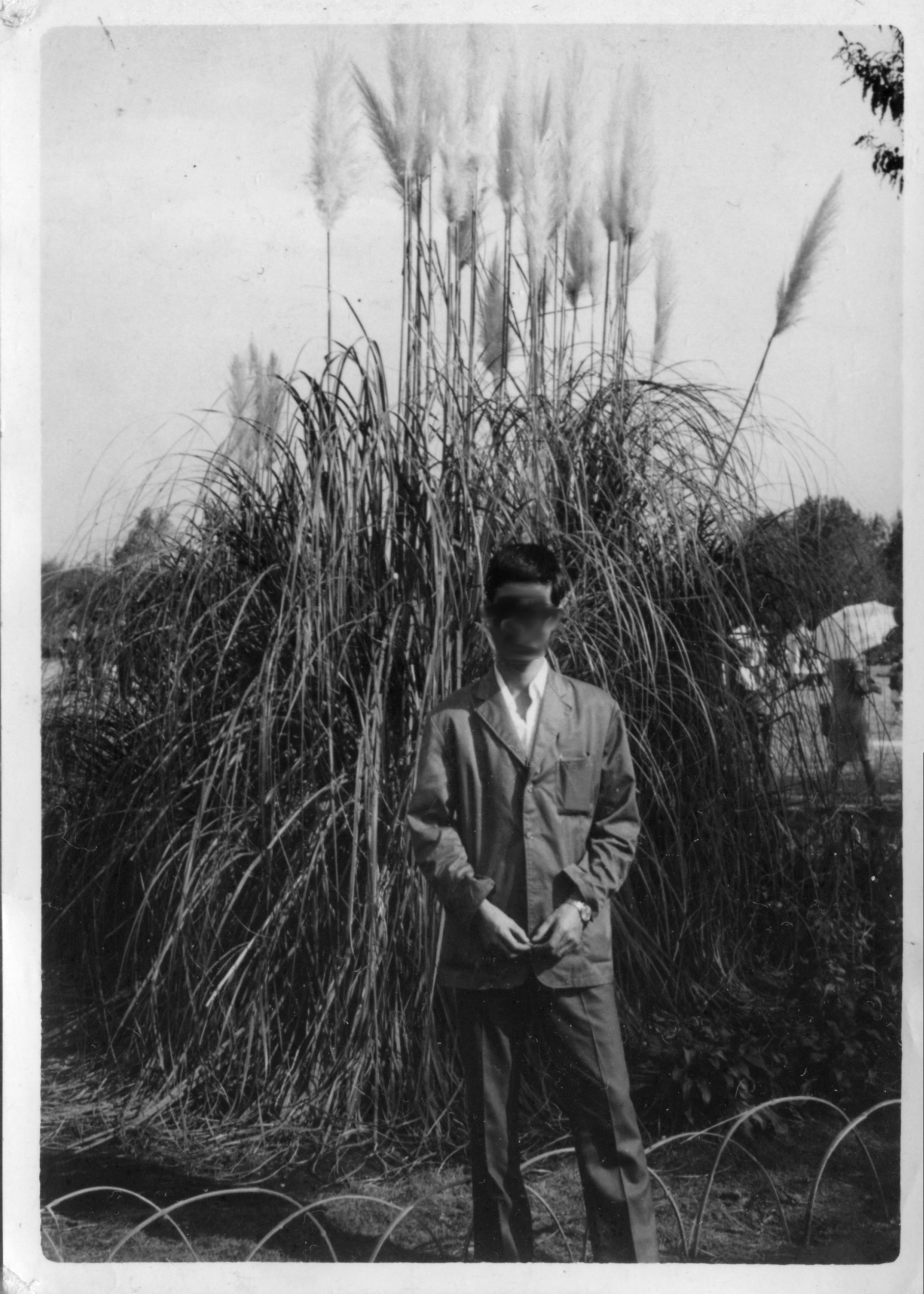
Jindai Botanical Garden, autumn 1964.

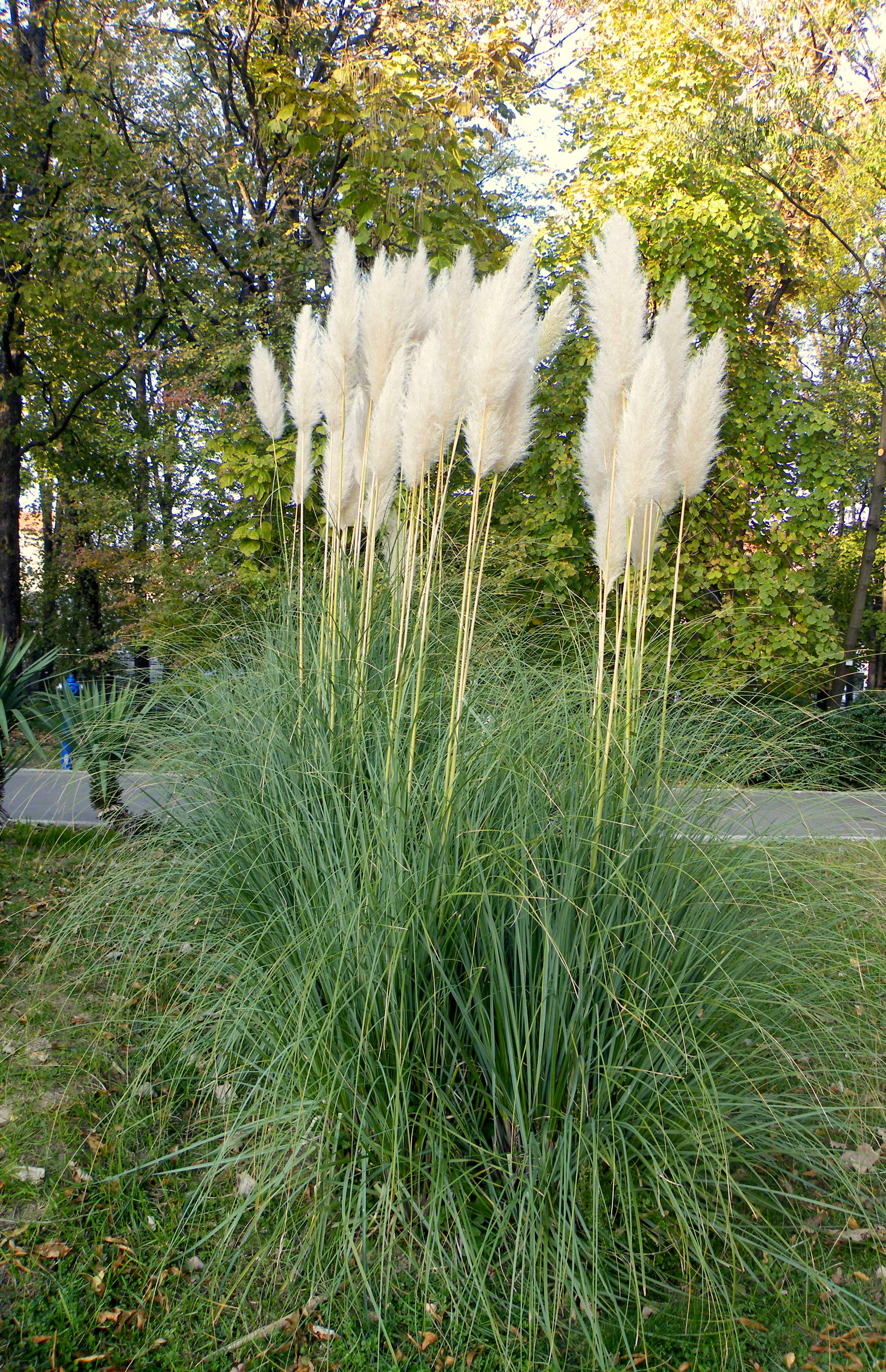

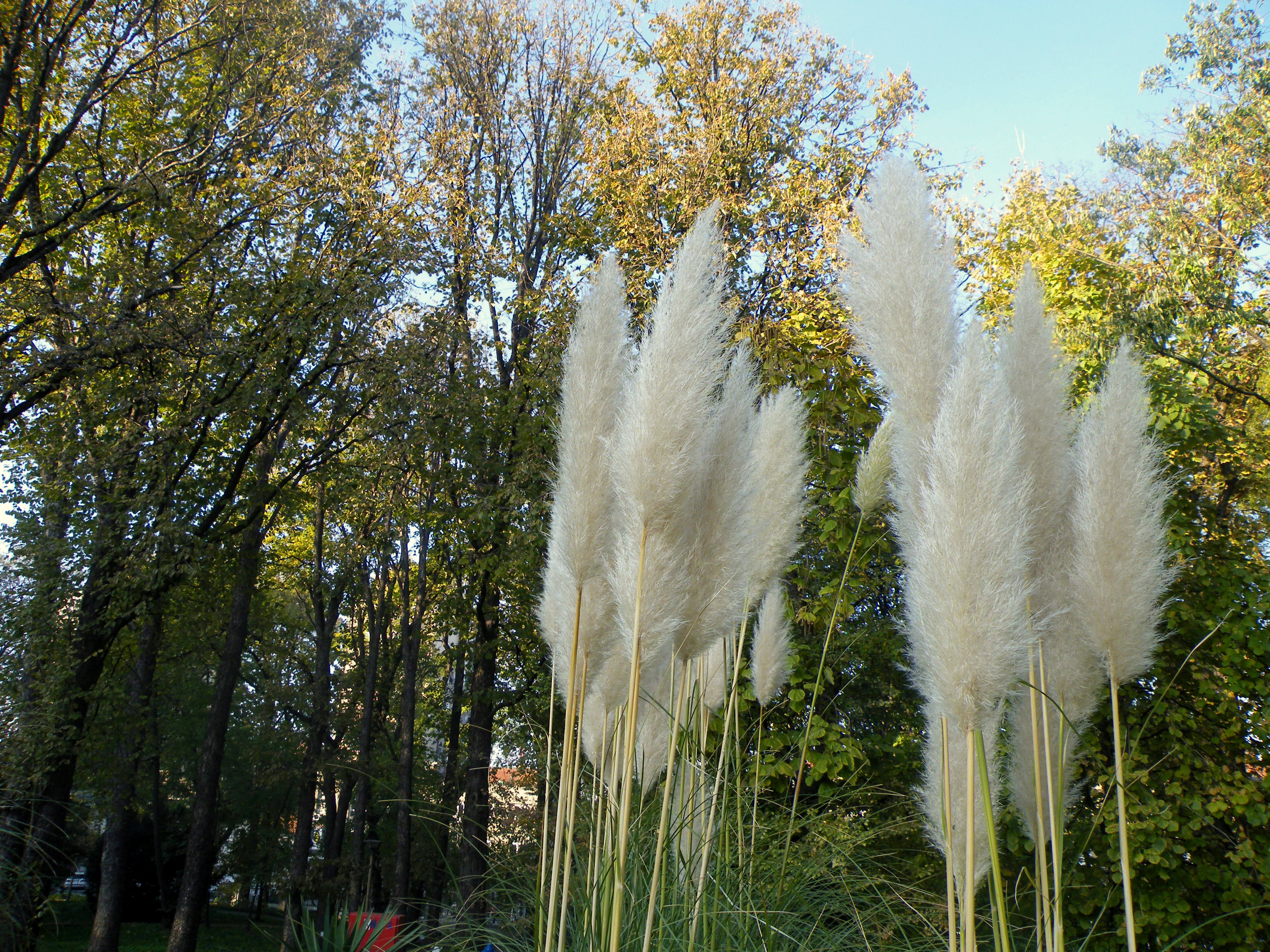

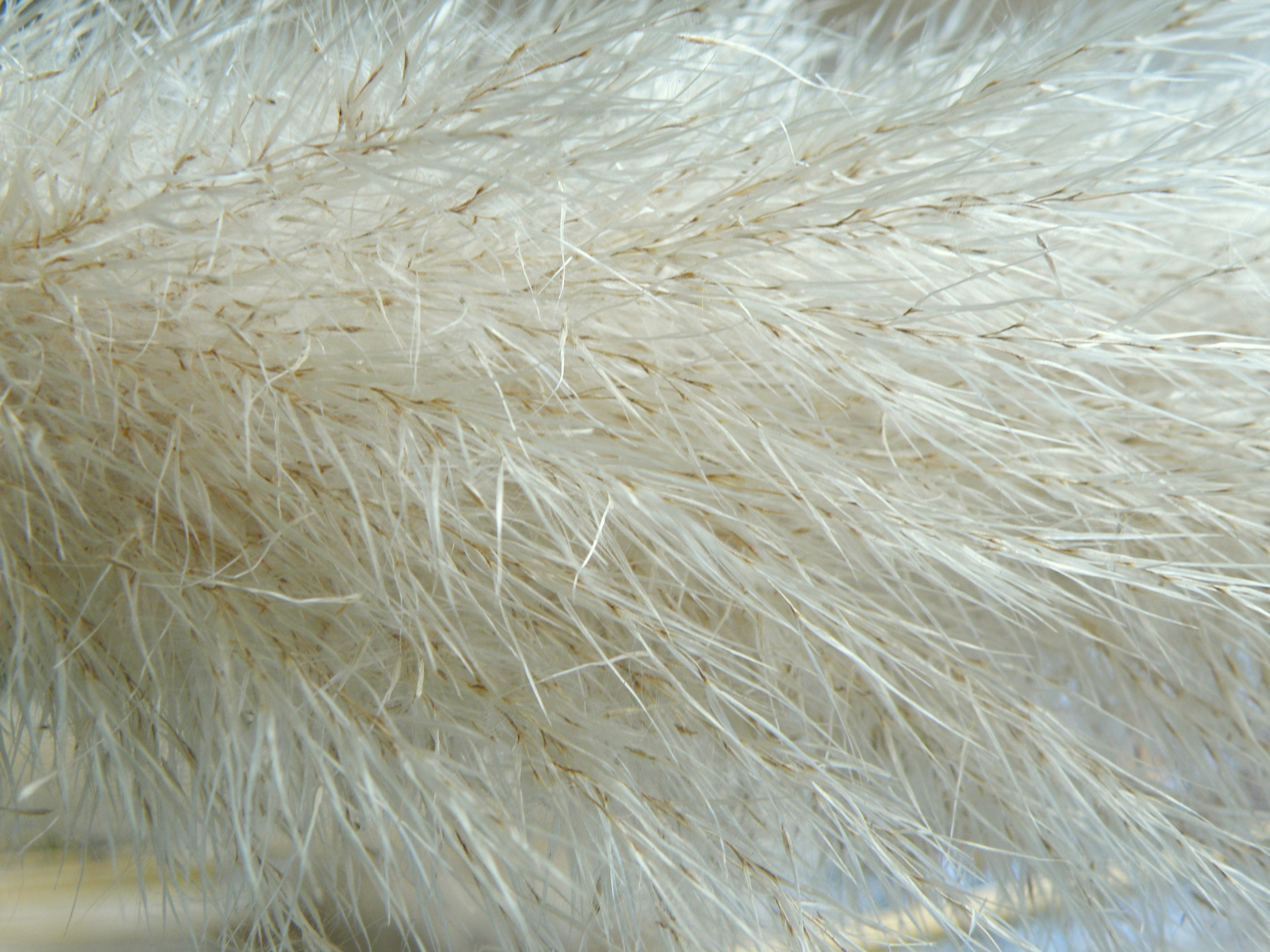
Flower detail.

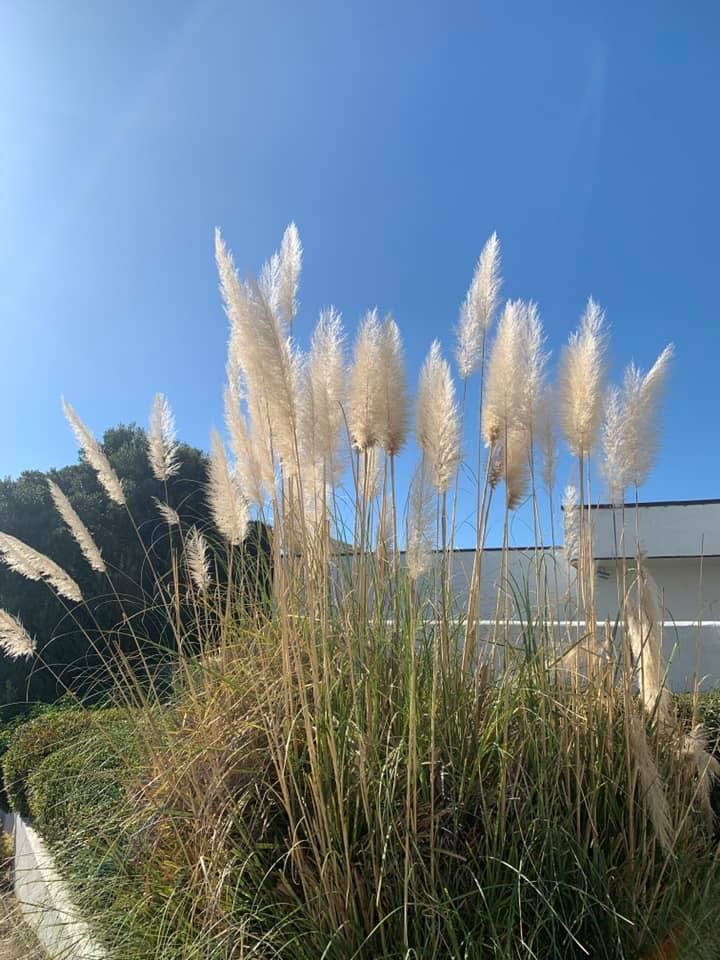
Plumes and foliage.

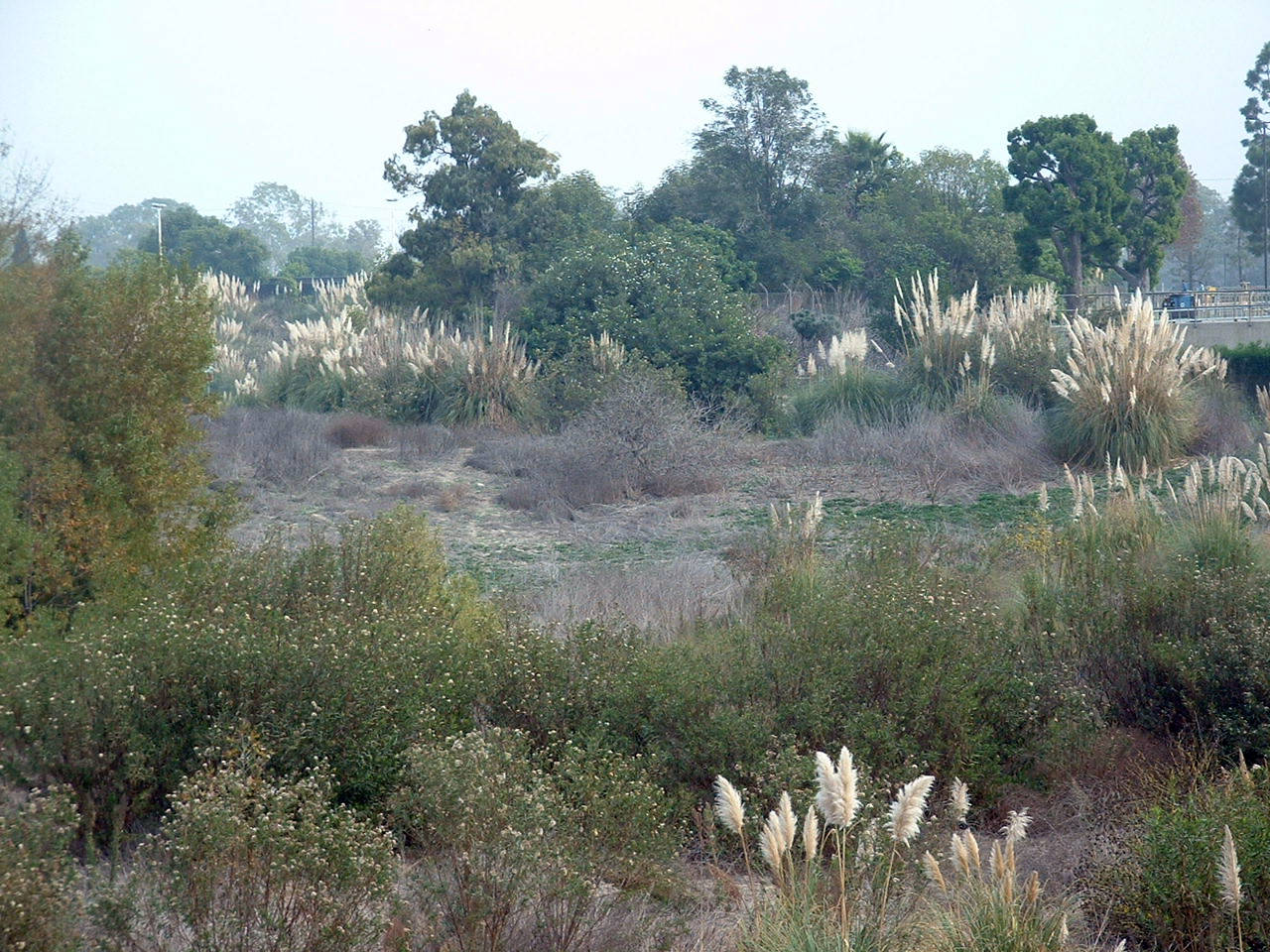
In California.

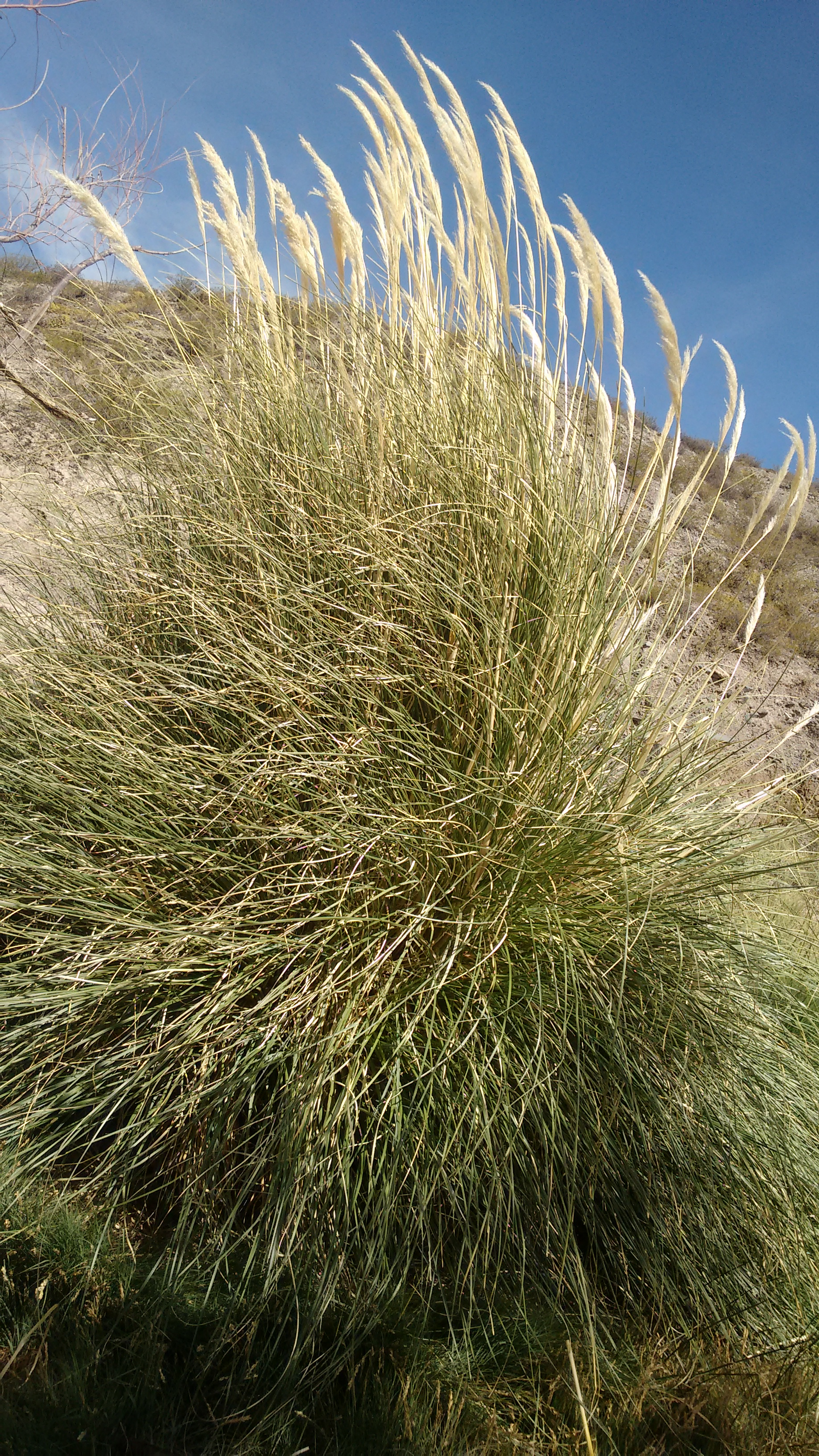
Shrub.
